= List of châteaux in Poitou-Charentes =

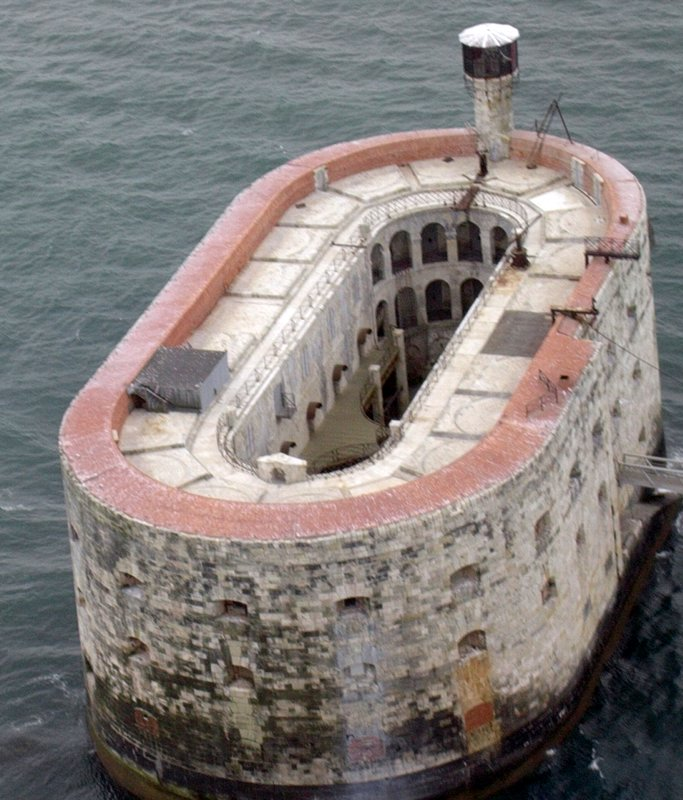
Fort Boyard

This is a list of châteaux in the former region of Poitou-Charentes, France.

== Charente ==
Ancient province of central Angoumois, Saintonge to the west, Périgord to the south-east, Limousin and Poitou to the north.

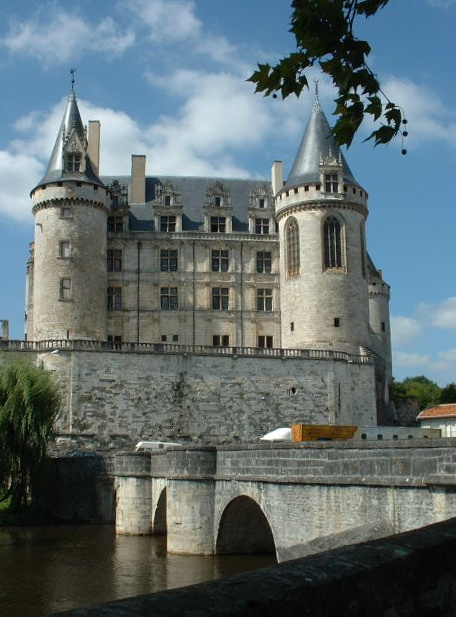
Château de La Rochefoucauld

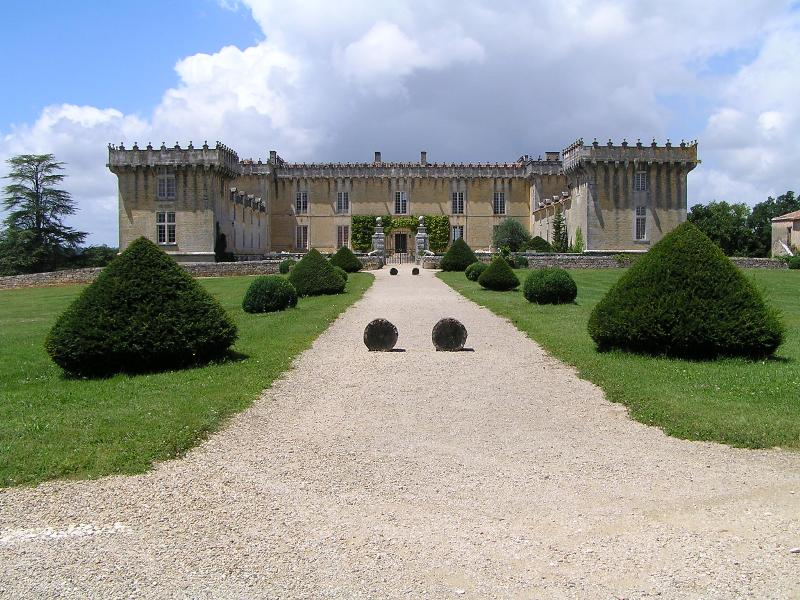
Chateau-Chesnel

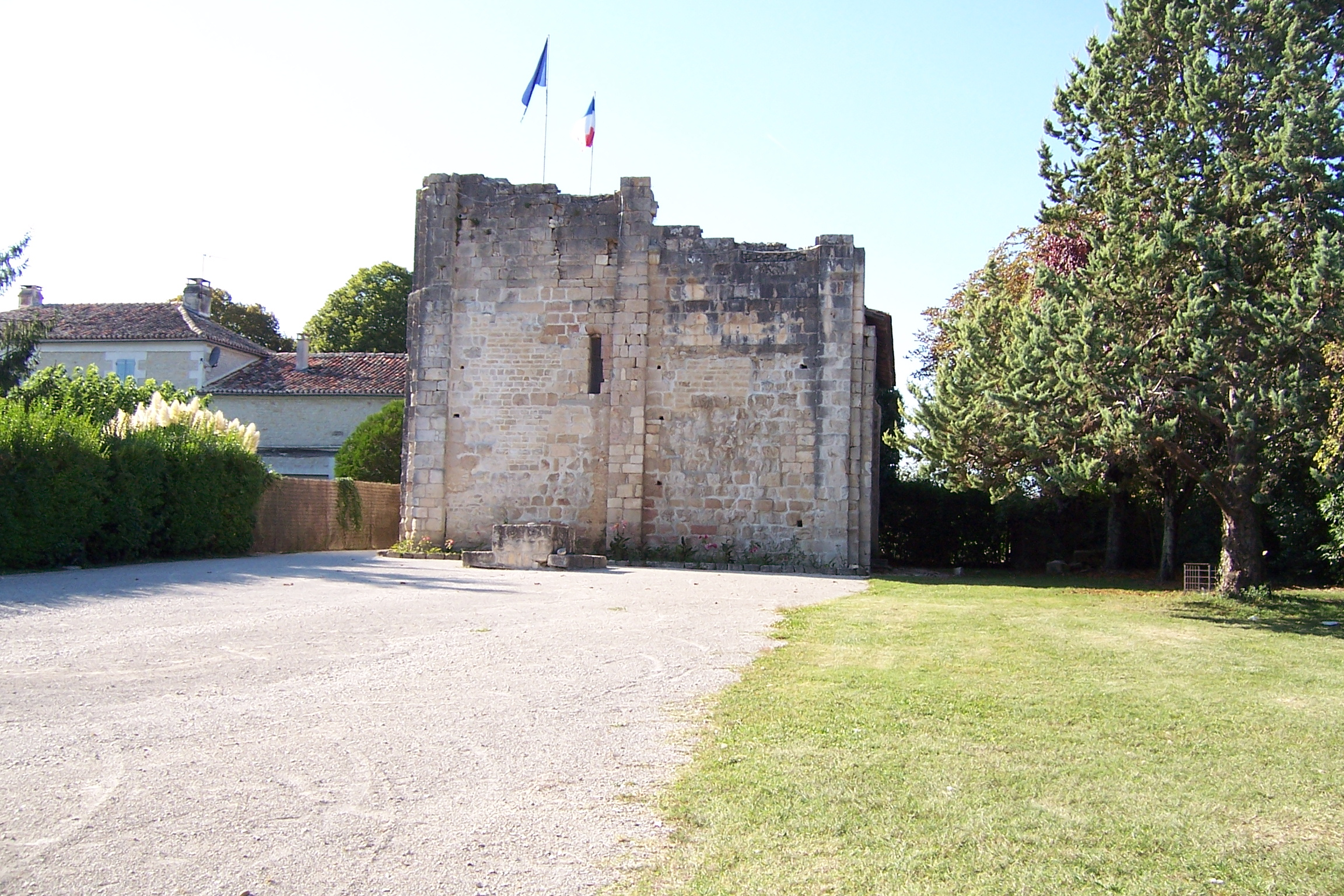
The dungeon of Montignac-Charente

- Château d'Angoulême in Angoulême
- Château d'Ars in Ars
- Château de Bagnolet in Cognac
- Château de Balzac in Balzac
- Château de Barbezieux in Barbezieux-Saint-Hilaire
- Château de Bayers in Bayers
- Château de Beauregard in Juillac-le-Coq
- Château de Blanzaguet-Saint-Cybard, Blanzaguet-Saint-Cybard
- Château de Bourg-Charente in Bourg-Charente
- Logis de Bourgneuf in Cherves-Richemont
- Logis de Boussac in Cherves-Richemont
- Château de Bouteville in Bouteville
- Château de la Bréchinie in Grassac
- Tour du Breuil in Dignac
- Château de Brigueuil in Brigueuil
- Château de Chalais in Chalais
- logis de Chalonne in Fléac
- Château de Chambes in Roumazières-Loubert
- Château de Chanteloup in Cherves-Richemont
- Château de Chatenay in Cognac
- Château Chesnel in Cherves-Richemont
- Château de la Chétardie in Exideuil
- Château de Chillac in Chillac
- Château de Cognac in Cognac
- Château de Confolens in Confolens
- Château de Cressé in Bourg-Charente
- Château d'Échoisy in Cellettes
- Château de la Faye in Deviat
- Château de Fleurac in Nersac
- Château de Gademoulins in Gensac-la-Pallue
- Château de Garde-Épée in Saint-Brice
- Château de Gourville in Gourville
- Château de Jarnac in Jarnac
- Château de Lignères in Rouillac
- Château de Lignières in Lignières-Sonneville
- Motte féodale de Loubert in Roumazières-Loubert
- Manoir du Maine-Giraud in Champagne-Vigny
- Donjon de Marthon in Marthon
- Château de Montausier in Baignes-Sainte-Radegonde
- Château de Montbron, at Montbron
- Château de Montchaude in Montchaude
- Donjon de Montignac-Charente in Montignac-Charente
- Logis de la Mothe in Criteuil-la-Magdeleine
- Château de Nieuil in Nieuil
- Château de l'Oisellerie in La Couronne
- Château de Peyras in Roumazières-Loubert
- Château de Puybautier in Saint-Coutant
- Château de Richemont in Cherves-Richemont
- Château de Rochebrune in Étagnac
- Château de La Rochefoucauld in La Rochefoucauld
- Château de Roissac in Angeac-Champagne
- Château de Saint-Brice in Saint-Brice
- Logis de Saint-Rémy in Cherves-Richemont
- Château de Saveille in Paizay-Naudouin-Embourie
- Logis Médiéval de Tessé in La Forêt-de-Tessé
- Château de la Tranchade in Garat
- Château de Triac in Triac-Lautrait
- Château de Verteuil in Verteuil-sur-Charente
- Château de Villebois-Lavalette in Villebois-Lavalette
- Château de Villevert in Esse

== Charente-Maritime ==
Ancient province of Aunis and Saintonge to the east.

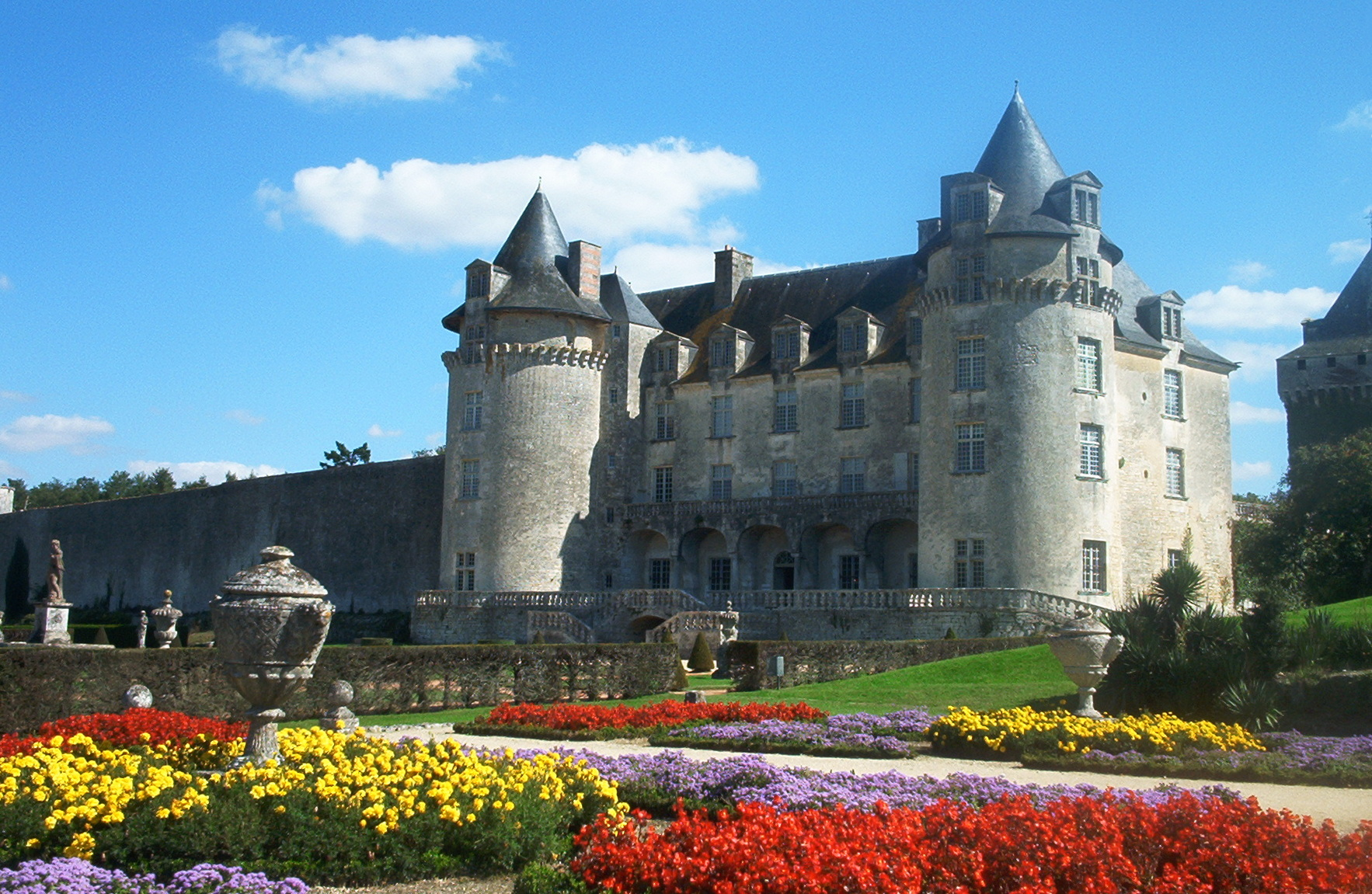
Château de la Rochecourbon

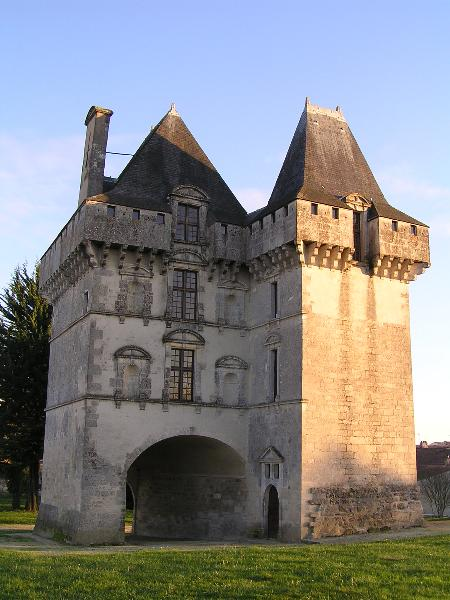
The gatehouse of the Château de Matha

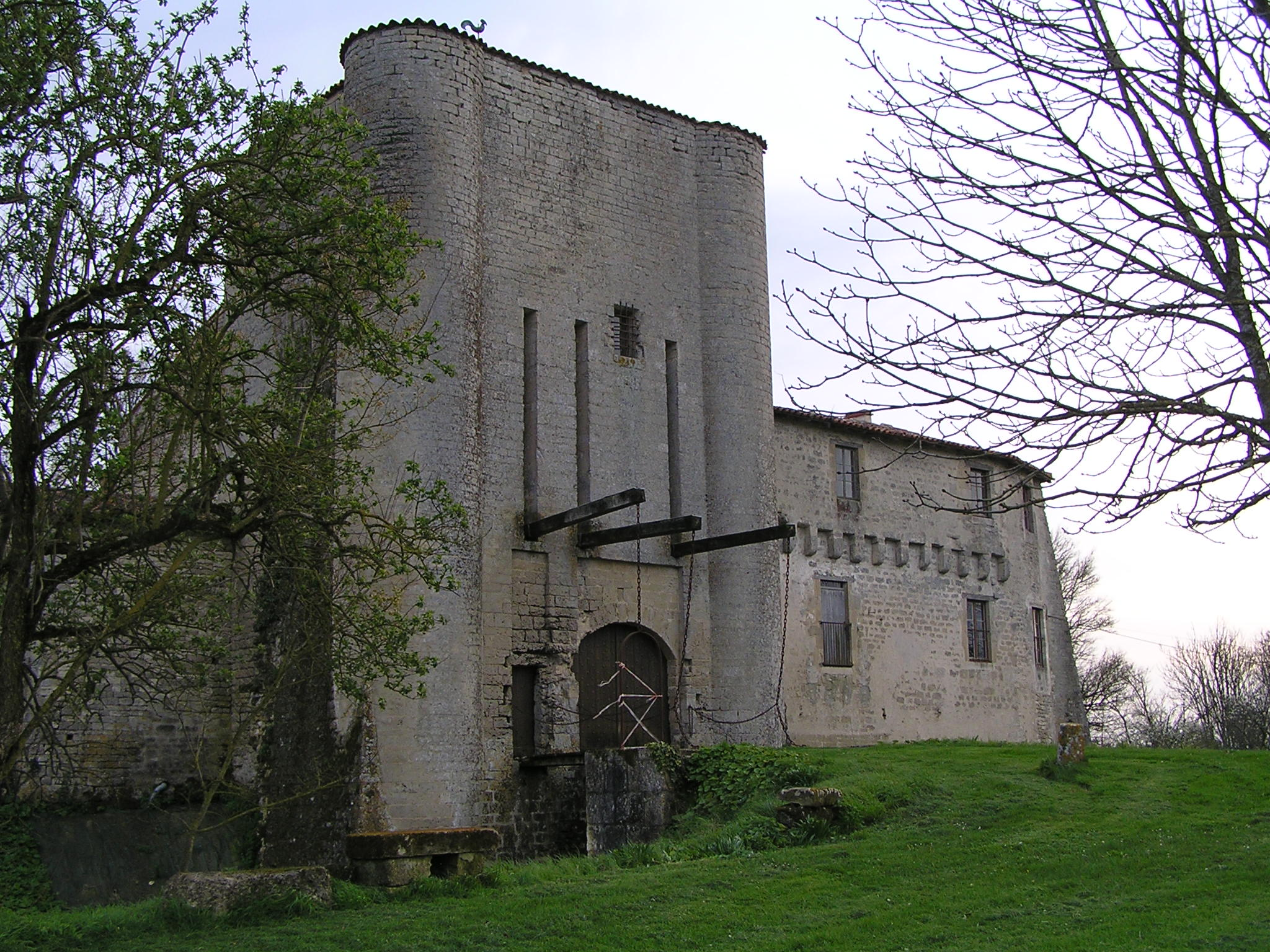
Château de Villeneuve la Comtesse

- Château d'Aulnay in Aulnay-de-Saintonge
- Château d'Authon in Authon-Ébéon
- Château de Balanzac in Balanzac
- Château de Beaufief in Mazeray
- Château de Beaulon in Saint-Dizant-du-Gua
- Château de Bois-Charmant, at Nouillers
- Fort Boyard, municipality of Île-d'Aix
- Tour de Broue in Saint-Sornin
- Château de Buzay in La Jarne
- Château de Crazannes in Crazannes
- Château de Dampierre-sur-Boutonne in Dampierre-sur-Boutonne
- Château du Douhet in Douhet
- Château d'Écoyeux or Château de Polignac, in Écoyeux
- Château de la Faye in Villexavier
- Donjon de Fouras in Fouras
- Château de la Gataudière in Marennes
- Tour de l'Isleau, le donjon de Saint-Sulpice-d'Arnoult
- Château de Jonzac in Jonzac
- Château de Lussac in Lussac
- Château de Matha in Matha
- Château de Meux in Meux
- Château de Mons in Royan
- Château de Montendre in Montendre
- Château de Montguyon in Montguyon
- Château de la Morinerie in Écurat
- Château de Mornay in Saint-Pierre-de-l'Isle
- Château de Neuvicq-le-Château in Neuvicq-le-Château
- Château de Nieul-lès-Saintes in Nieul-lès-Saintes
- Château de Panloy in Port-d'Envaux
- Château de Pisany in Pisany
- Château de Plassac in Plassac
- Donjon de Pons in Pons
- Château de Ransanne in Soulignonne
- Château de Rioux in Rioux
- Château de la Rochecourbon in Saint-Porchaire
- Château de Romefort in Saint-Georges-des-Coteaux
- Château de Saint-Jean-d'Angle in Saint-Jean-d'Angle
- Château de Saint-Maury in Pons, birthplace of Théodore Agrippa d'Aubigné, French Protestant, Baroque writer and poet.
- Tour de Saint-Sauvant in Saint-Sauvant
- Hospice de Soubise or Hôtel des Rohan, à Soubise
- Château de Taillebourg in Taillebourg
- Château de Tesson in Tesson
- Château d'Usson or Château des Énigmes in Pons
- Château de Villeneuve-la-Comtesse in Villeneuve-la-Comtesse

== Deux-Sèvres ==
Ancient province of Poitou

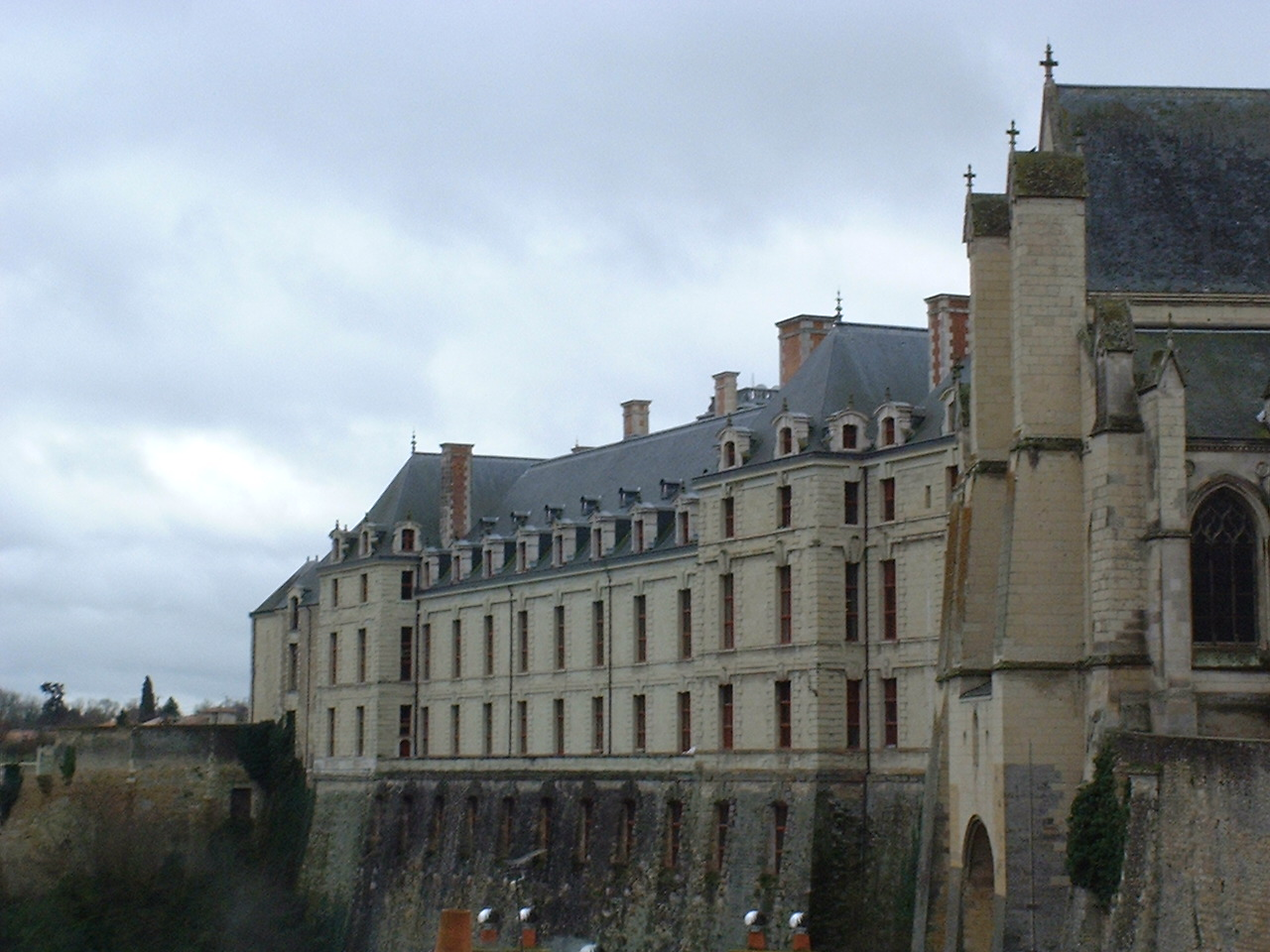
Château des Ducs de La Trémoille

- Château d'Airvault in Airvault
- Château du Bois de Sanzay in Saint-Martin-de-Sanzay
- Château de Bourdin in Saint-Pardoux
- Château de Bressuire in Bressuire
- Château de La Chapelle-Bertrand in La Chapelle-Bertrand
- Château de Cherveux in Cherveux
- Château Coudray-Salbart in Échiré (fortified castle)
- Château de Coulonges-sur-l'Autize in Coulonges-sur-l'Autize
- Château du Deffend in Montravers
- Château des Ducs de La Trémoille, in Thouars
- Château de la Durbelière, in Mauléon (the old town of Saint-Aubin-de-Baubigné)
- Château de la Foye in Couture-d'Argenson
- Château de la Guyonnière in Beaulieu-sous-Parthenay
- Château de l'Herbaudière in Saivres
- Château de Saugè in Saivres www.chateaudesauge.com
- Château de Javarzay in Chef-Boutonne
- Château de Jouhé in Pioussay
- Château de Maisontiers in Maisontiers
- Château de Mursay in Échiré
- Donjon de Niort in Niort
- Château de Nuchèze in Champdeniers-Saint-Denis
- Château d'Oiron in Oiron
- Château d'Olbreuse in Usseau
- Château d'Orfeuille in Gourgé
- Château des Ousches in Saint-Génard
- Château de Parthenay in Parthenay
- Château de Payré in La Peyratte
- Château de Piogé in Availles-Thouarsais
- Château de la Roche Faton in Lhoumois
- Château de Saint-Loup-sur-Thouet in Saint-Loup-Lamairé
- Château de Saint-Mesmin in Saint-André-sur-Sèvre
- Château de Saint-Symphorien in Saint-Symphorien
- Château de Sanzay in Argenton-les-Vallées
- Château de la Sayette in Vasles
- Château du Chilleau in Vasles
- Château de la Rochetaillée in Échiré
- Château de Tennessus in Amailloux
- Château du Vieux Deffend in Montravers
- Château de la Villedieu de Comblé in La Mothe-Saint-Héray

== Vienne ==
Ancient province of Poitou

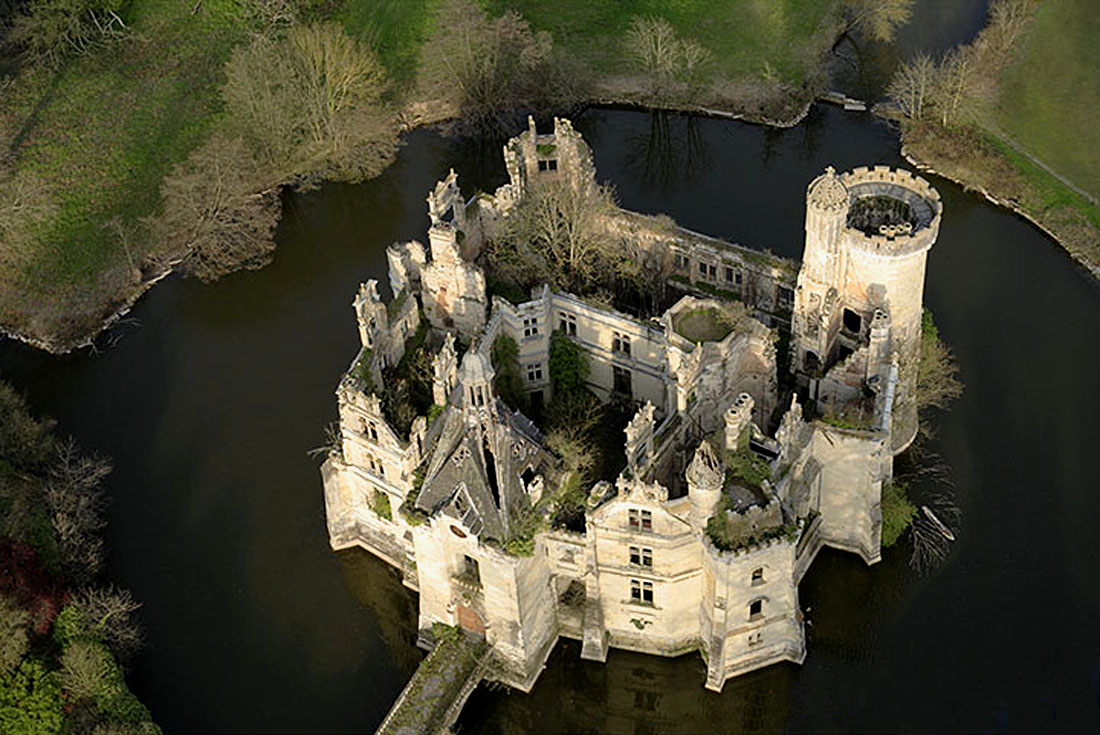
Château de la Mothe-Chandeniers

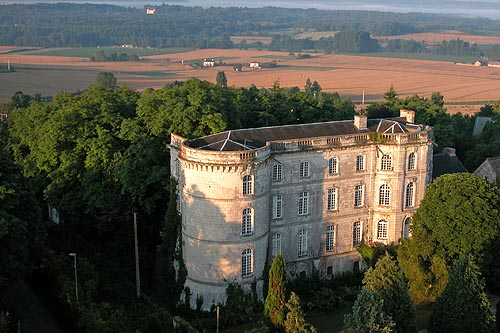
Château de Targé

- Château d'Angles-sur-l'Anglin in Angles-sur-l'Anglin
- Château de Berrie in Berrie
- Château du Bois-Doucet in Lavoux
- Château de la Bonnetière in La Chaussée
- Château de Bonnivet in Vendeuvre-du-Poitou
- Château de Chambonneau in Gizay
- Château de la Chapelle Bellouin in La Roche-Rigault
- Château de Château-Larcher including the Tour Metgon, in Château-Larcher
- Complexe castral de Chauvigny in Chauvigny
- Château de la Chèze in Latillé
- Château de Chiré-en-Montreuil in Chiré-en-Montreuil
- Château de Chitré in Vouneuil-sur-Vienne
- Château du Cibioux in Surin
- Château de Clairvaux in Scorbé-Clairvaux
- Tour du Cordier in Poitiers
- Château-Couvert in Jaunay-Clan
- Château de Cujalais in Ceaux-en-Couhé
- Château de Dissay in Dissay
- Château d'Épanvilliers in Brux
- Château du Fou in Vouneuil-sur-Vienne
- Château de Galmoisin in Saint-Maurice-la-Clouère
- Château de Gençay in Gençay
- Château de Gilles de Rais in Cheneché
- Château du Haut-Clairvaux in Scorbé-Clairvaux
- Château de la Jarige in Pressac
- Château de La Lande in Montmorillon
- Château de Léray in Saint-Pierre-d'Exideuil
- Château de Loudun in Loudun
- Château de Lusignan in Lusignan
- Château de Masseuil in Quinçay
- Château de la Merveillère in Thuré
- Château de la Messelière in Queaux
- Donjon de Moncontour in Moncontour
- Château de Monts-sur-Guesnes in Monts-sur-Guesnes
- Château de Morthemer in Valdivienne
- Château de la Mothe-Chandeniers, at Trois-Moutiers
- Château de la Motte in Usseau
- Château des Ormes, at Ormes
- Château de Puygarreau in Saint-Genest-d'Ambière
- Château de la Réauté in Ligugé
- Château des Robinières in Scorbé-Clairvaux
- Château de la Roche-Gençay in Magné
- Donjon de Saint-Cassien in Angliers
- Château de Targé in Châtellerault
- Château de Ternay in Ternay
- Manoir de la Thibaudière in Tercé
- Château de Touffou in Bonnes
- Château de Vaucour in Leignes-sur-Fontaine
- Château de Vayres in Saint-Georges-lès-Baillargeaux
- Château de la Vervolière in Coussay-les-Bois
- Tour de Viliers Boivin in Vézières
- Château d'Yversay in Yversay

== See also ==
- List of castles in France
