= Derrière les murs =

- Directed by: Pascal Sid; Julien Lacombe
- Written by: Julien Lacombe; Pascal Sid
- Produced by: Alain Benguigui; Thomas Verhaeghe
- Starring: Laetitia Casta
- Cinematography: Nicolas Massart
- Edited by: Richard Marizy
- Music by: David Reyes
- Production company: Sombrero Films
- Distributed by: BAC Films; Europa Corp. Roissy Films
- Release date: 6 July 2011
- Country: France
- Language: French
- Box office: $950.758

Derrière les murs (known as Behind the Walls in the US) is a French supernatural-thriller film written and directed by Julien Lacombe and Pascal Sid.

== Plot ==
The story is about a young writer, played by Laetitia Casta, who goes to the countryside in order to find inspiration. There, she is haunted by nightmares and depressions while in the area young girls disappear without a trace.

== Cast ==
- Laetitia Casta as Nicole
- Thierry Neuvic as Philippe
- Jacques Bonnaffé as Paul
- Roger Dumas as Father Francis
- Anne Benoît as Catherine Luciac
- Anne Loiret as Yvonne
- Emma Ninucci as Valentine
- Mathilde Tolleron as Joséphine

== Production ==
The film was shot largely in the Haute-Loire department, specifically in the small village of Blassac. Many scenes were also shot in the Vienne department, at the Château de Ternay near Loudun, and at the Château de Foussac in La Bussière. Filming also took place the railway station in Richelieu, in the Indre-et-Loire department.

The Sombrero Films production is the first French live-action adaption shot in 3-D.

== Release ==
The film was release theatrically in France by BAC Films. The United States theatrical release was set for the first trimester 2011 as Behind the Walls.

== Soundtrack ==
The score was composed by the Belgian composer David Reyes.
