= Château de Javarzay =

Château in Chef-Boutonne, Deux-Sèvres, France

Coordinates: 46°06′33″N 0°04′58″E

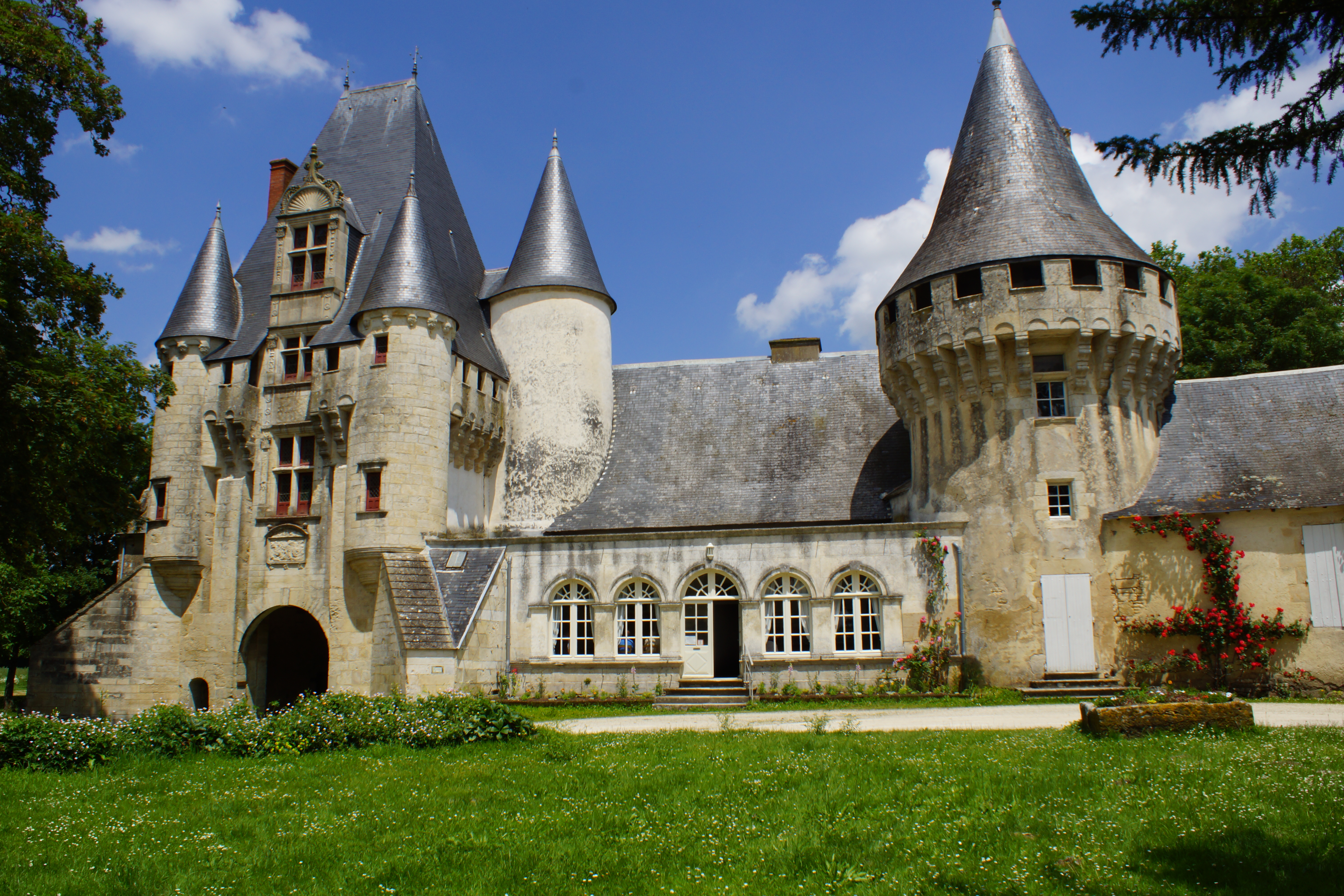

The Château de Javarzay is a château incorporating remains of an earlier castle in the commune of Chef-Boutonne in the Deux-Sèvres département of France.

== History ==
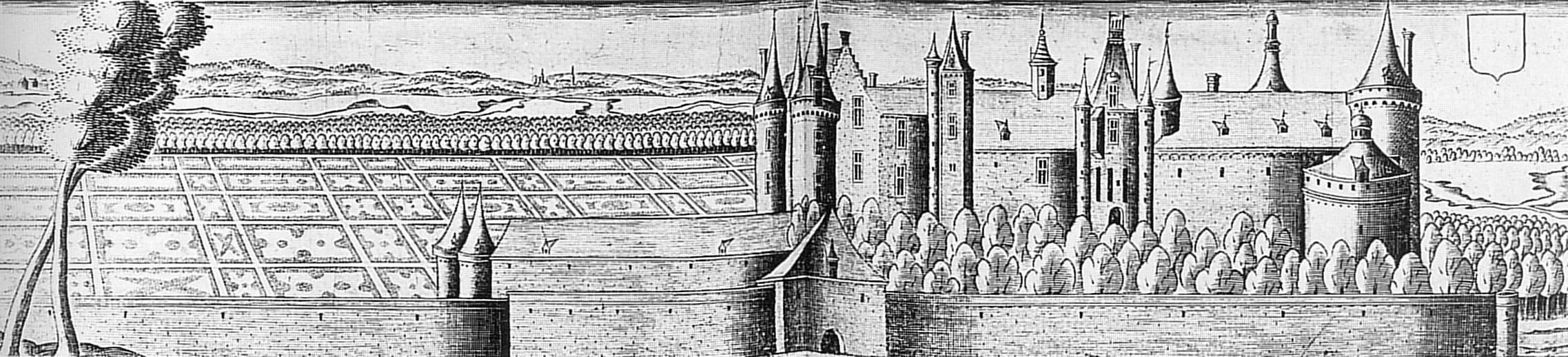
The 16th–17th century château

The early castle comprised an enceinte flanked by 12 towers, of which only two remain.

The castle was reconstructed in 1514 by members of the House of Rochechouart. The property has had a number of owners; the Rochefoucauld-Roye family bought it from François de Rochechouart of Chandeniers in 1655; Jérôme Phélypeaux, Count of Pontchartrain and minister of Louis XIV; Guillaume-Chrétien de Lamoignon de Malesherbes, lawyer of Louis XVI. Jérôme Phélypeaux, Secretary of State for the Navy, son of the Chancellor of France Louis, bought the estate of Javarzay in 1712 for the sum of 100,000 livres, but there was a family connection: his wife was Eléonore-Christine de La Rochefoucauld, daughter of Frédéric-Charles, Count of Roucy and Roye (known as "mademoiselle de Chef-Boutonne"). In 1785, at least, the owner was Joseph Michel Le Blois, advocate at the military tribunals during the French Revolution. His daughter, Marie-Anne (born in the château in 1787) married Ange Achille de Brunet, Count of Neuilly.

What remains of the château, the most imposing of the period in Deux-Sèvres, is the building which joins the two towers and the chapel. The left wing has been destroyed and the right wing is a later construction. The enceinte was demolished between 1820 and 1824 and the sculptures have disappeared. The orangery dates from 1854.

The Château de Javarzay is the property of the commune. It was classified as a monument historique by the French Ministry of Culture in 1862.

== Architecture ==
The Château de Javarzay combines both Renaissance and feudal aspects with its machicolations and its moat as well as conical roofs covered with slate. Its entrance pavilion is flanked by four corbelled turrets.

Details

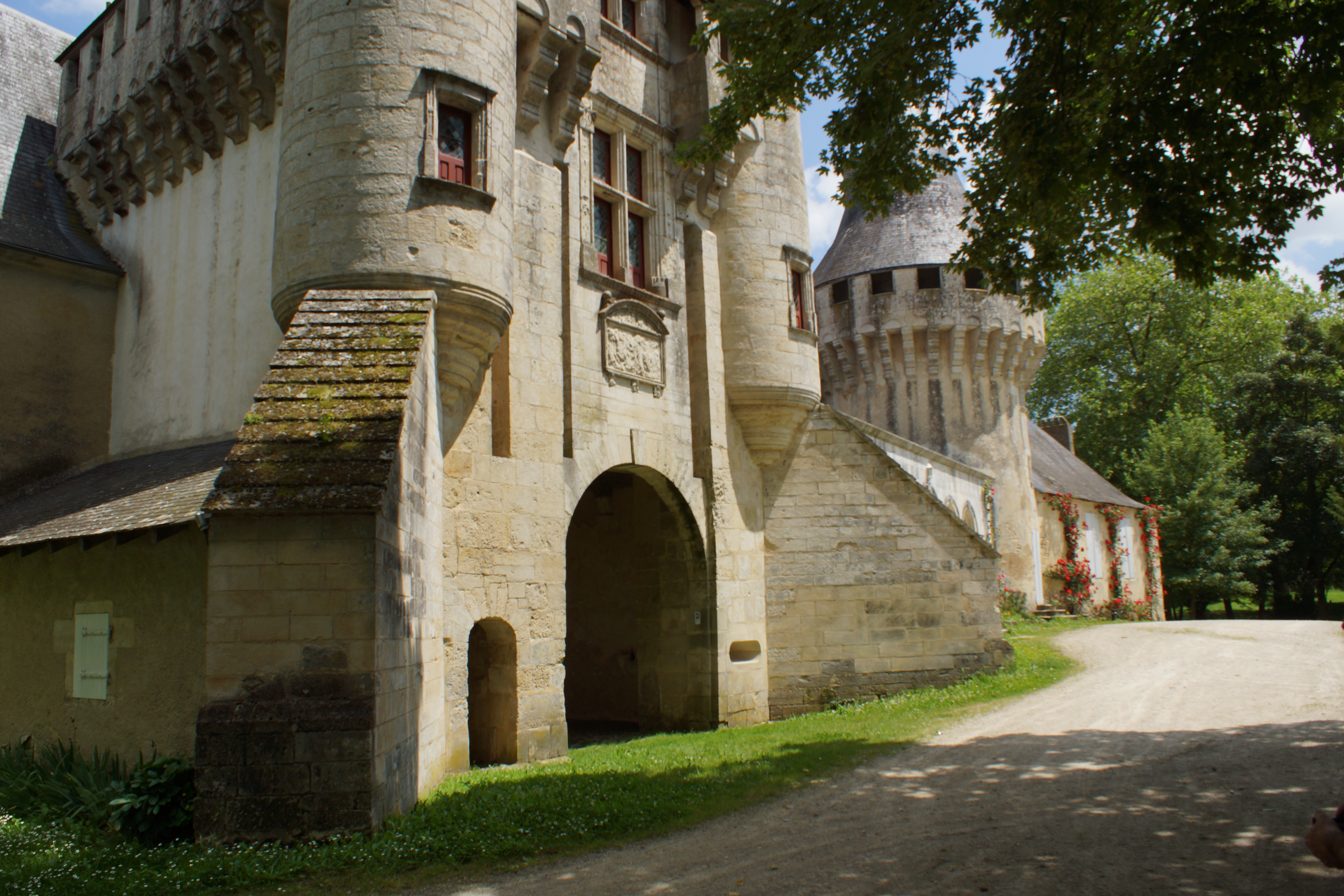

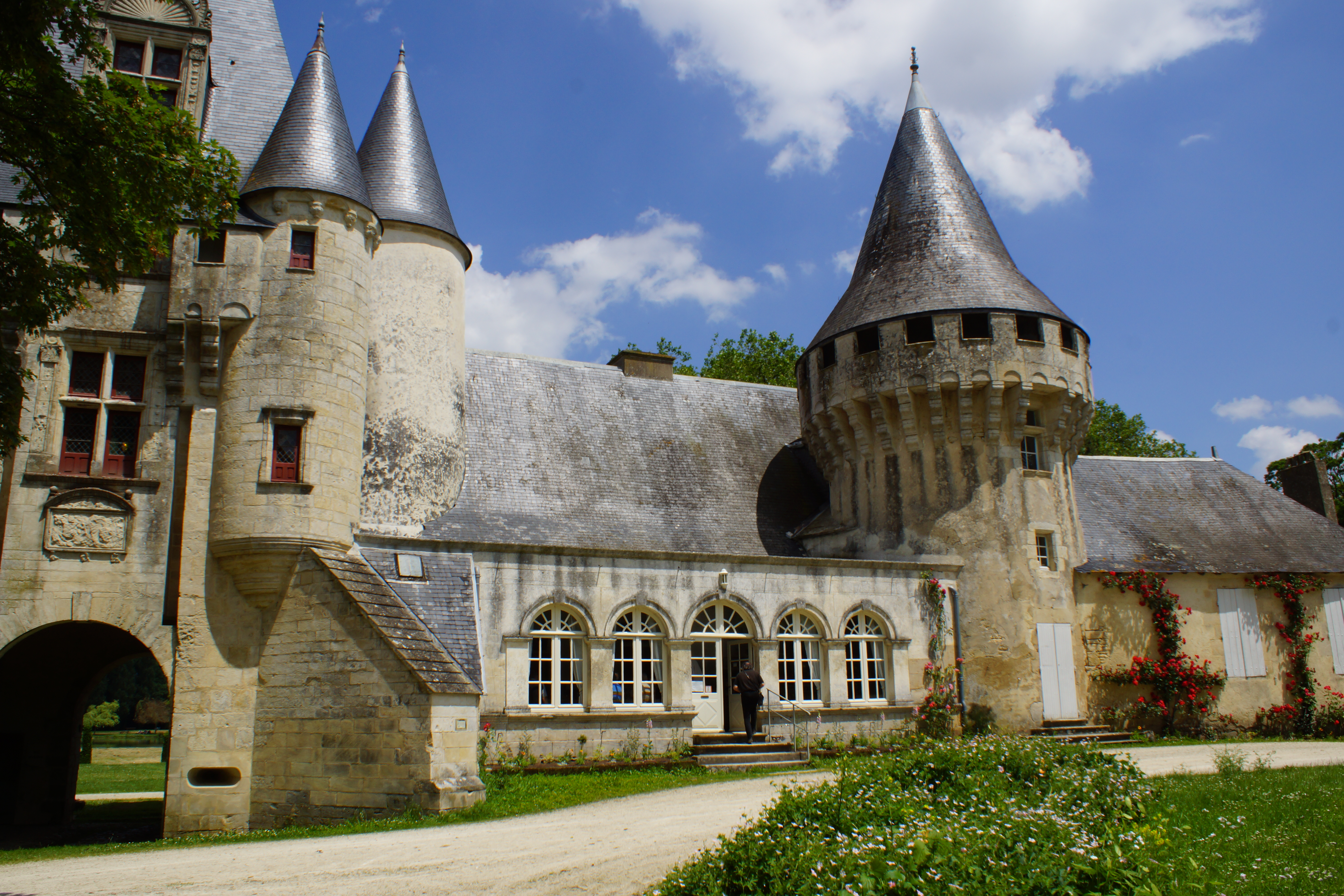

== Park and gardens ==
The park surrounding the château is open to the public every day, free of charge.

Numerous walks are possible around the fish lake, along the Boutonne, the river which borders the park, as well as laid out Balades et Découvertes circuits. Picnic and play areas are available.

== Visits ==
A visit to the château de Javarzay includes:

the Renaissance château, its chapel and the round walk
the headdress museum with a remarkable collection of nearly 400 antique headdresses and hats from several French regions
a permanent exhibition dedicated to the life and work of Jean-François Cail (1804-1871), a great 19th century industrialist (railways, sugar, agriculture), born in Chef-Boutonne

A Balades et Découvertes circuit starts from in front of the château. It follows the Boutonne River and goes around Chef-Boutonne, taking in the 11th century market hall, the house where Jean-François Cail was born and the source of the Boutonne.

== See also ==
- List of castles in France

== Bibliography ==
- Prahecq, Châteaux, manoirs, logis des Deux-Sèvres, Éditions Patrimoines et Médias, 1993, ISBN 2-910137-04-X
