= Château de Beaulon =

Château in Nouvelle-Aquitaine, France

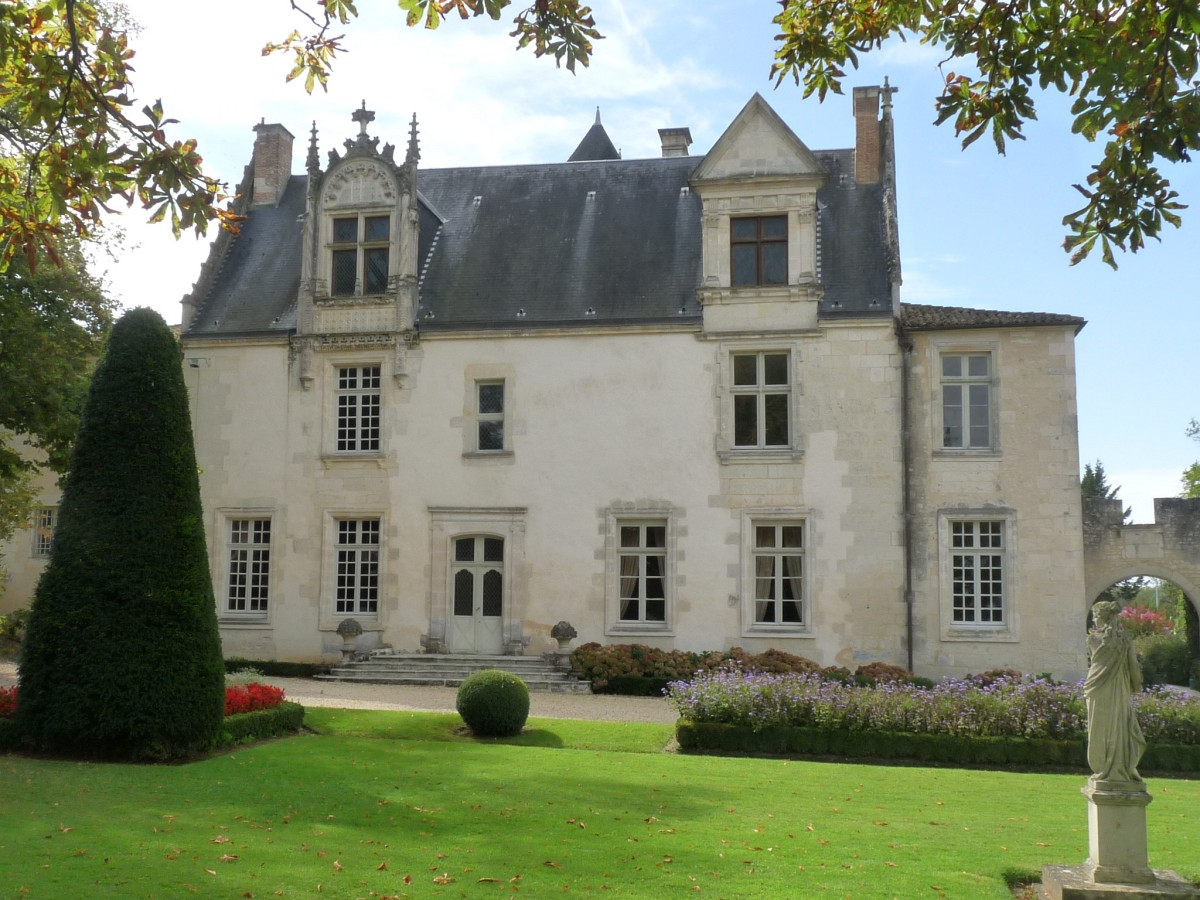
Château de Beaulon, with Gothic facade and garden

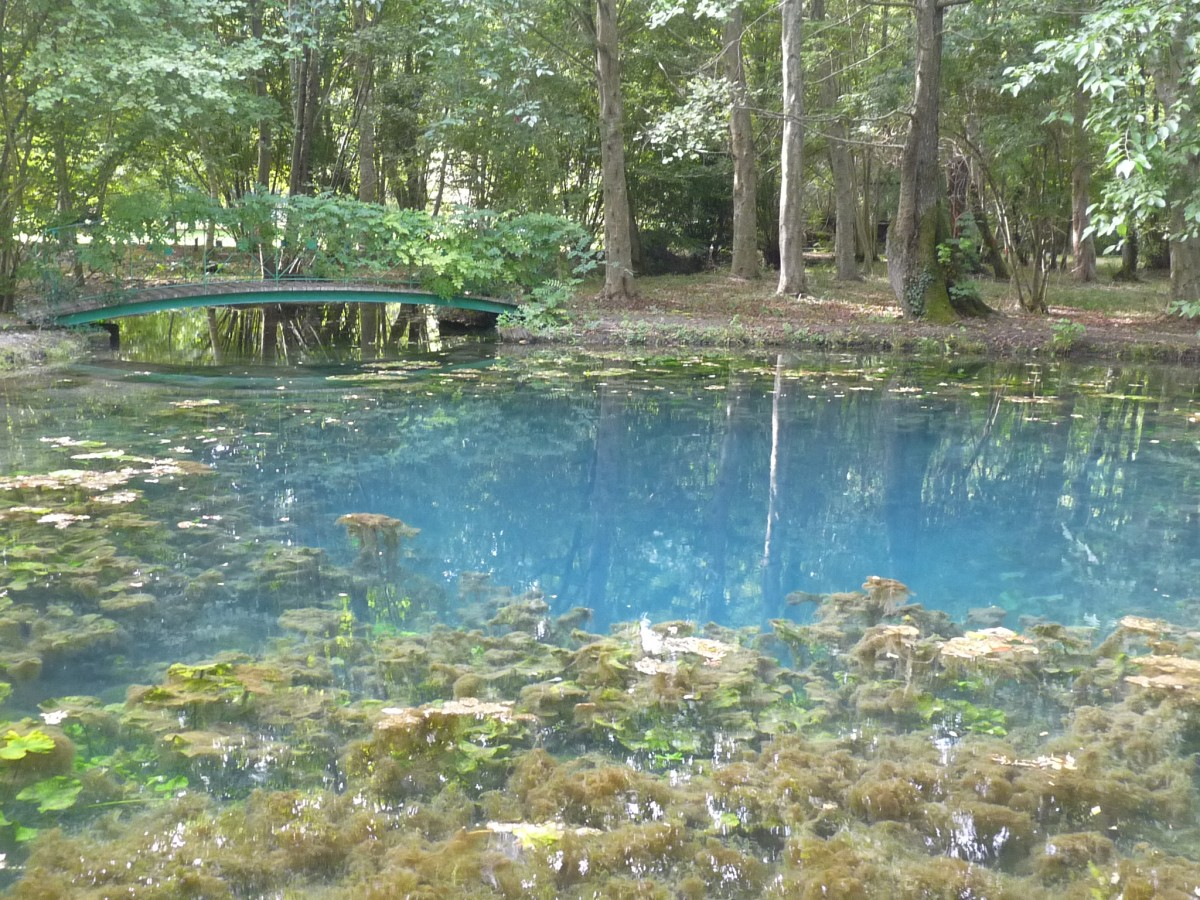
The Fontaines Bleues natural springs

The Château de Beaulon is a château—castle located in the town of Saint Dizant du Gua, near the southwestern coast in the Charente-Maritime Department of the Poitou-Charentes region, in France. The privately owned château, gardens, and landscape park, a Monument historique, are open to the public.

== Château ==
The château was built circa 1480 as a residence for the Bishops of Bordeaux. The château has both stone Gothic and Renaissance style facades. It is presently owned by the royal family of Abu Dhabi

== Gardens ==
The present gardens were created beginning in 1942. The park includes a French formal garden around the château, and an English landscape garden. The garden is listed by the Committee of Parks and Gardens of the French Ministry of Culture as one of the Remarkable Gardens of France.

A major feature of the landscape park are the Fontaines Bleues, natural springs whose waters are an unusual brilliant hue of blue. There is also a round dovecote structure with a conical roof, dating from 1740, with fifteen hundred nesting holes.

The gardens suffered major damage from the storm of 1999, which blew down hundreds of trees. They have since been replanted and are restored.
