= Château de Vayres (Saint-Georges-lès-Baillargeaux) =

Castle in Nouvelle-Aquitaine, France

Coordinates: 46°39′38″N 0°23′25″E

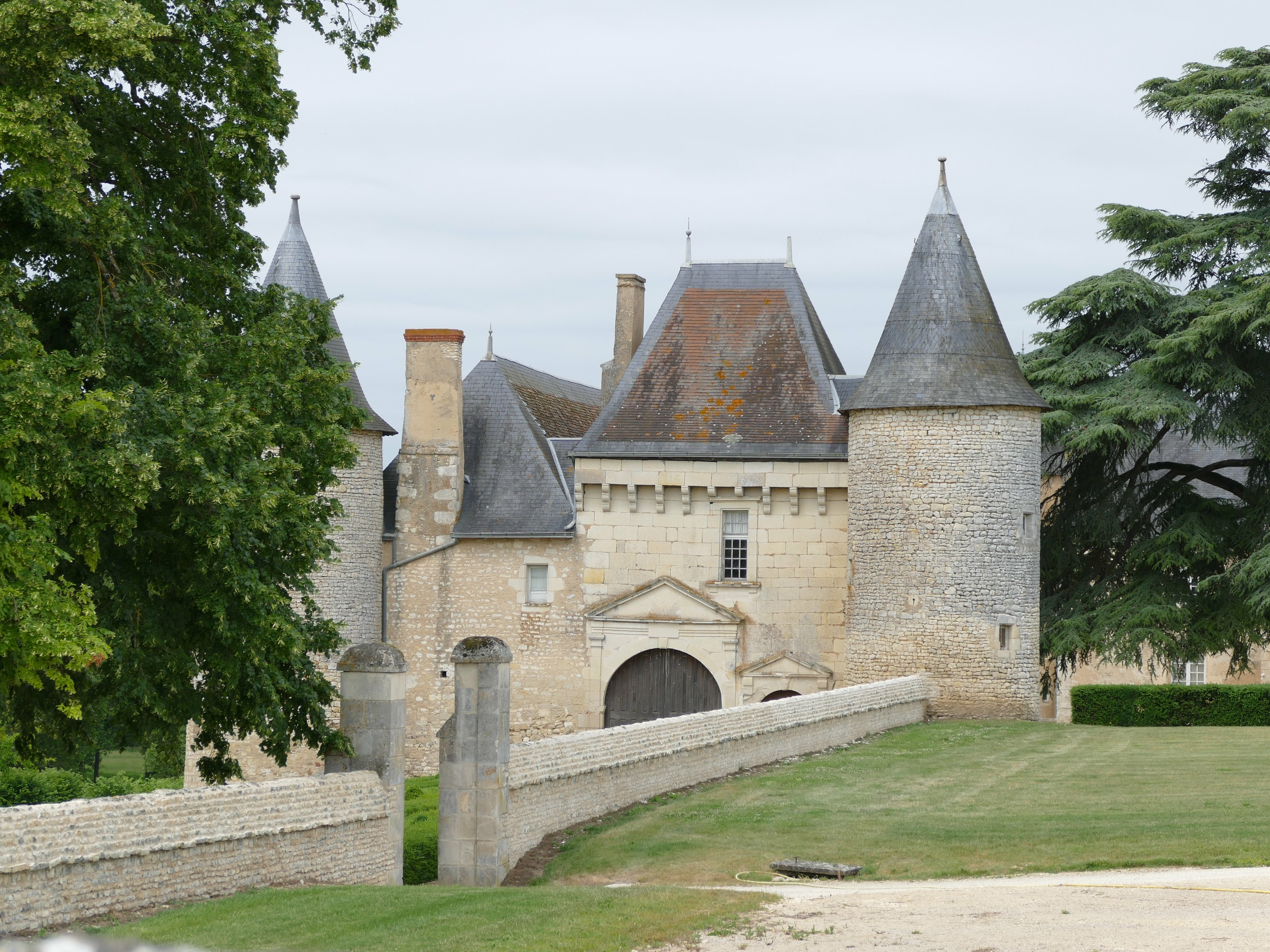
The castle seen from the road

The Château de Vayres is located in Saint-Georges-lès-Baillargeaux in the department of Vienne (Nouvelle-Aquitaine region).

== History ==
Built from the 14th century, it was listed as a historical monument in 1959 (castle facades and roofs), registered in 1966 (gardens), and classified in 1994 (castle dovecote).

In the late 1930s, the castle was purchased by the photographer François Kollar, who moved in with his family during the Occupation.

== See also ==
- List of châteaux in Poitou-Charentes
