= Colombiers, Vienne =

Colombiers
- Commune
- Coat of arms
- Location of Colombiers
- Location within France Location within Nouvelle-Aquitaine
- Coordinates: 46°46′23″N 0°25′36″E
- Country: France
- Region: Nouvelle-Aquitaine
- Department: Vienne
- Arrondissement: Châtellerault
- Canton: Châtellerault-1
- Intercommunality: CA Grand Châtellerault

Government
  - Mayor (2020–2026): Hindeley Mattard
- Area^{1}: 20.77 km^{2} (8.02 sq mi)
- Elevation: 139 m (456 ft)
- Highest elevation: 153 m (502 ft)
- Lowest elevation: 56 m (184 ft)
- Population (2023): 1,405
  - Density: 67.65/km^{2} (175.2/sq mi)
- Time zone: UTC+01:00 (CET)
  - Summer (DST): UTC+02:00 (CEST)
- INSEE/Postal code: 86081 /86490
- ^{1} French Land Register data, which excludes lakes, ponds, glaciers > 1 km^{2} (0.386 sq mi or 247 acres) and river estuaries.

Colombiers (French pronunciation: [kɔlɔ̃bje]) is a commune in the Vienne department in the Nouvelle-Aquitaine region in Western France.

== Demographics ==
Historical population
Year	Pop.	±% p.a.
1968	790	—
1975	846	+0.98%
1982	1,078	+3.52%
1990	1,286	+2.23%
1999	1,274	−0.10%
2007	1,471	+1.81%
2012	1,513	+0.56%
2017	1,501	−0.16%
2023	1,405	−1.10%
Source: INSEE

== See also ==
- Communes of the Vienne department
