= Château de Rochebrune =

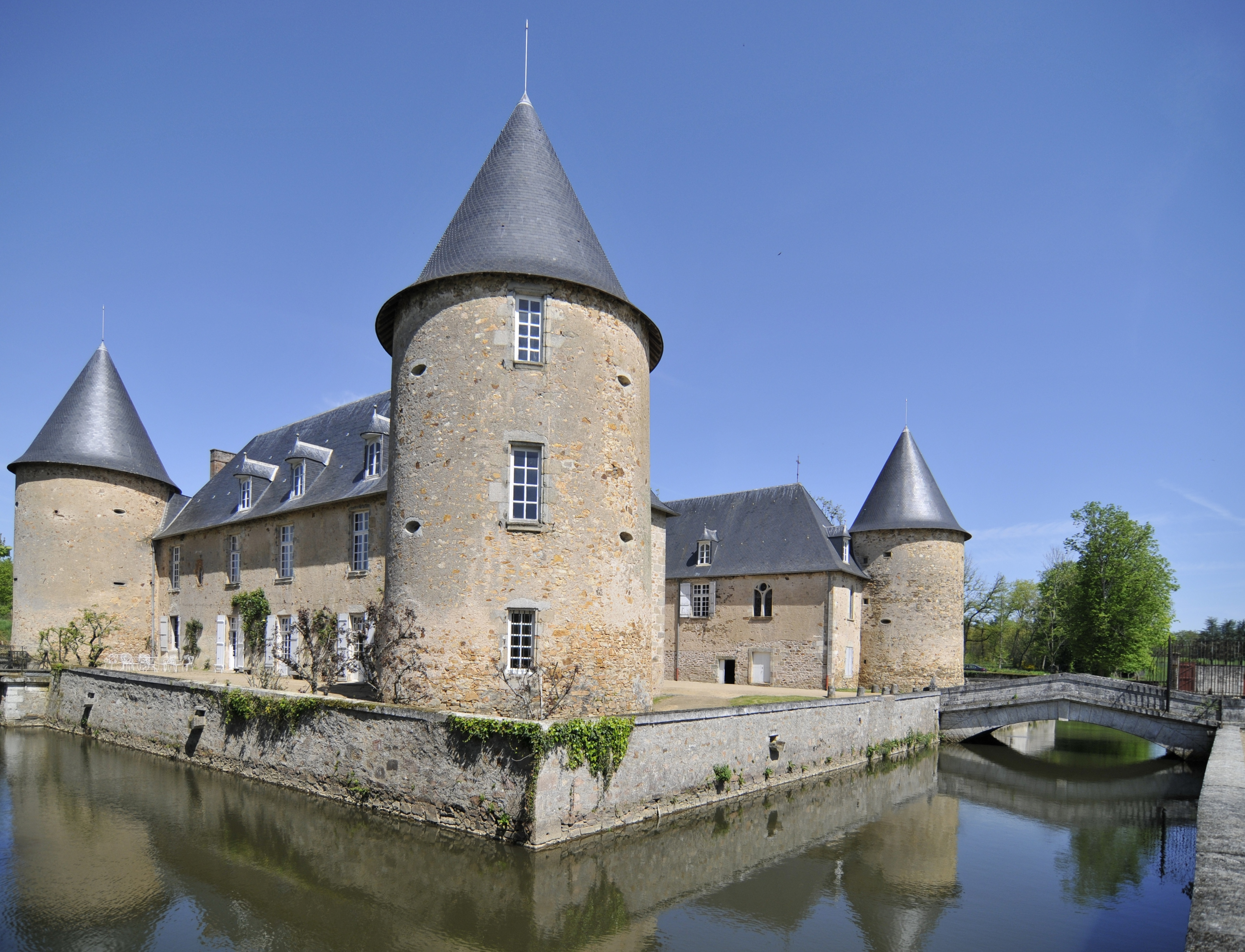
- Interactive map of the Château de Rochebrune area

General information
- Type: Château
- Classification: Monument historique (24 June 1959)
- Location: Étagnac, Charente, Poitou-Charentes, France
- Coordinates: 45.8967°N 0.7871°E

The Château de Rochebrune is an historic castle in Étagnac, Charente, France. It was built in the 11th and 12th centuries. It has been listed by the French Ministry of Culture since June 24, 1959.
