= Château du Fou =

Castle in Nouvelle-Aquitaine, France

Coordinates: 46.7200°N 0.5094°E

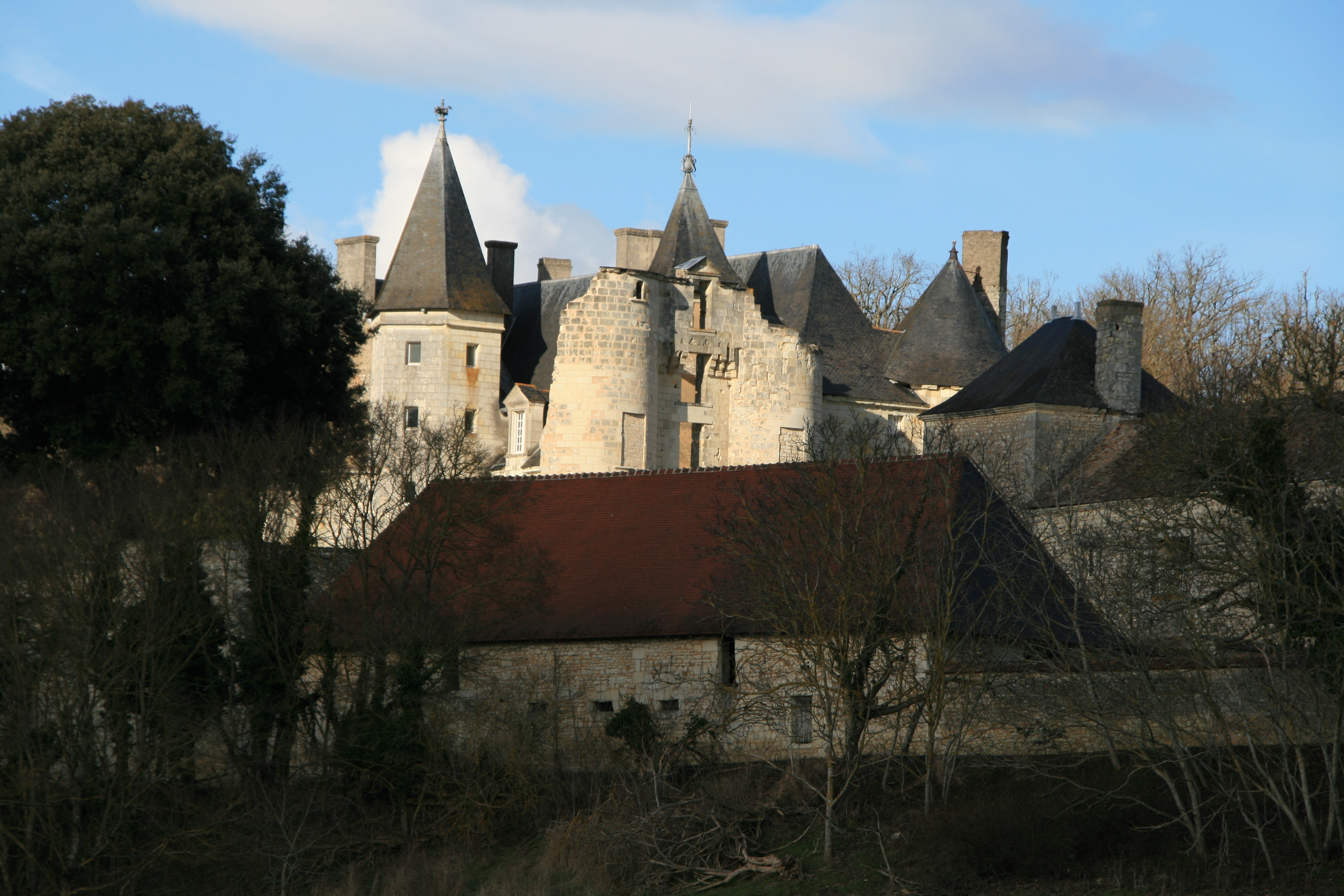

The Château du Fou is a castle in the commune of Vouneuil-sur-Vienne in the Vienne département of France.

== History ==
The Château du Fou was constructed by Yves du Fou, Sénéchal of Poitou at the end of the 15th century.

In 1539, François I met Charles V, Holy Roman Emperor, there.

In the 17th and 18th centuries, the lordship of Fou was held by the family (Tiercelin) of Appelvoisin, marquess of La Roche du Maine, in Prinçay.

In 1795, Charlotte Félicité Elisabeth (Tiercelin) d'Appelvoisin de La Roche du Maine married François-Gabriel-Thibault de La Brousse, marquis de Verteillac, baron de la Tour-Blanche, bringing to him the Château du Fou, where he died on 26 October 1854

In 1855, the castle was sold. In the late nineteenth and twentieth century, it belonged to the family of La Borie de Campagne.

During the Second World War, the castle suffered bombardment on 2 August 1944, particularly damaging the south and north wings, British bombers had attempted to flush out a German general, who had been occupying the castle as if a lord among his staff. German soldiers were buried under the castle, some dead or wounded, but the general escaped by plane the next morning. The damage has since been restored.

The postern, the moat, the towers, the turret, the staircase and the vault were classified as historical monuments by a decree of 6 February 1953. The rest of the castle, including the parts not built on, were registered with the Supplementary Inventory of Historical Monuments by a decree of 9 November 2010.

== Architecture ==
The castle remains are the moat, the remains of the entrance postern with its two towers and the turret staircase with its vault.

== See also ==
- List of castles in France
