= Scorbé-Clairvaux =

- Commune
- Coat of arms
- Location of Scorbé-Clairvaux
- Location within France Location within Nouvelle-Aquitaine
- Coordinates: 46°48′49″N 0°24′50″E
- Country: France
- Region: Nouvelle-Aquitaine
- Department: Vienne
- Arrondissement: Châtellerault
- Canton: Châtellerault-1
- Intercommunality: CA Grand Châtellerault

Government
  - Mayor (2020–2026): Lucien Jugé
- Area^{1}: 22.85 km^{2} (8.82 sq mi)
- Elevation: 95 m (312 ft)
- Highest elevation: 171 m (561 ft)
- Lowest elevation: 58 m (190 ft)
- Population (2023): 2,174
  - Density: 95.14/km^{2} (246.4/sq mi)
- Time zone: UTC+01:00 (CET)
  - Summer (DST): UTC+02:00 (CEST)
- INSEE/Postal code: 86258 /86140
- ^{1} French Land Register data, which excludes lakes, ponds, glaciers > 1 km^{2} (0.386 sq mi or 247 acres) and river estuaries.

Scorbé-Clairvaux (French pronunciation: [skɔʁbe klɛʁvo]) is a commune in the Vienne department in the Nouvelle-Aquitaine region in western France.

== Demographics ==
Historical population
| Year | Pop. | ±% p.a. |
|---|---|---|
| 1968 | 1,315 | — |
| 1975 | 1,427 | +1.17% |
| 1982 | 1,919 | +4.32% |
| 1990 | 2,110 | +1.19% |
| 1999 | 2,123 | +0.07% |
| 2007 | 2,376 | +1.42% |
| 2012 | 2,327 | −0.42% |
| 2017 | 2,259 | −0.59% |
| 2023 | 2,174 | −0.64% |
Source: INSEE

== See also ==
- Communes of the Vienne department
