= Château de Barbezieux =

Castle in Nouvelle-Aquitaine, France

Coordinates: 45°28′23″N 0°9′27″W

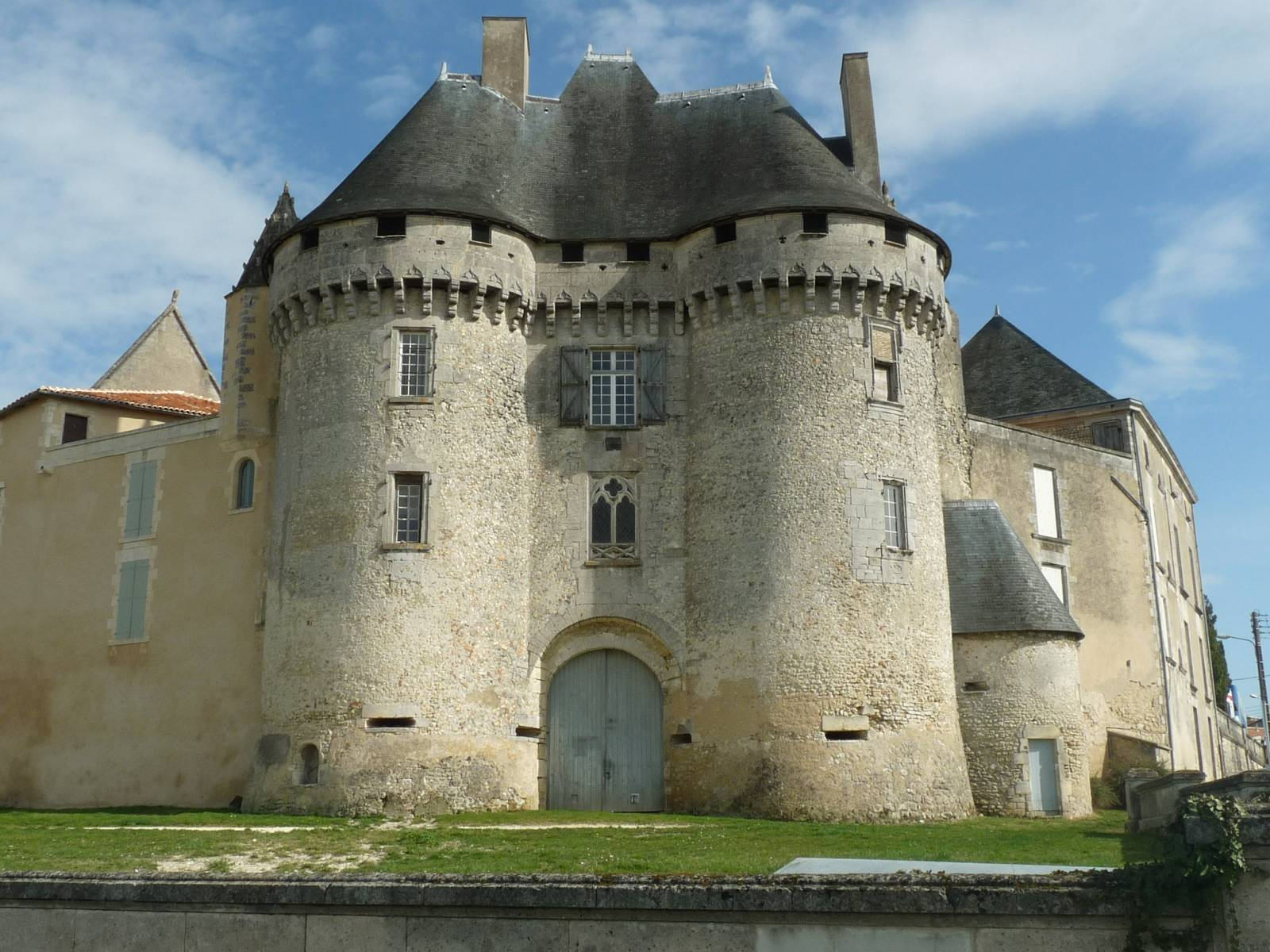
The Château de Barbezieux

The Château de Barbezieux is a castle situated in the commune of Barbezieux-Saint-Hilaire, in the Charente département of France. It dates from 1453, though an earlier castle, of which no trace remains, stood on the site from the early 11th century. The castle has been listed since 1913 as a monument historique by the French Ministry of Culture.

== History ==
The present castle was built on the orders of Marguerite de La Rochefoucauld in 1453 to provide work during a time of famine.

The castle has been the property of many of the great names and families of French history, notably Barbezieux, La Rochefoucauld, d’Espinay de Duretal, Schomberg-Vignier, Richelieu, Le Tellier and Louvois.

Sold during the French Revolution, the south east corner was strengthened by the département and used as a prison until 1820. In 1844, the castle was bought by the town which flattened part and restored the rest for a variety of uses.

In 1860, part of the building was converted under the direction of architect Pierre Lacombe for use as a hospital, until 1908, and a girls' school. From 1900, the former stables have been used as a theatre. About 1922, a new building was constructed at the west by architect Maurice Mignon and houses a library.

== Architecture ==
Even today, the castle appears as an imposing fortress. The two high round towers are covered by a single roof which also covers the central passage. Openings for cannons are visible. Of the inner curtain, a fragment of the north wall survives along with the covered round walk, terminating to the east with a semi-cylindrical tower. In the south east, the gateway is framed by round towers. Above the gate is the Saint-Ymas church with its single nave of four bays. To the south, demolished in the 18th century, stood the keep composed of two towers. In the north west, between two towers, a double-gabled building has been nicknamed pavillon de la recette. A tennis court and a well are close by. A second well supplied the keep. Ditches surrounded each of the curtain walls.

== See also ==
- List of castles in France
