= Château de Bourg-Charente =

Castle in Nouvelle-Aquitaine, France

- Bourg-Charente, Charente, France
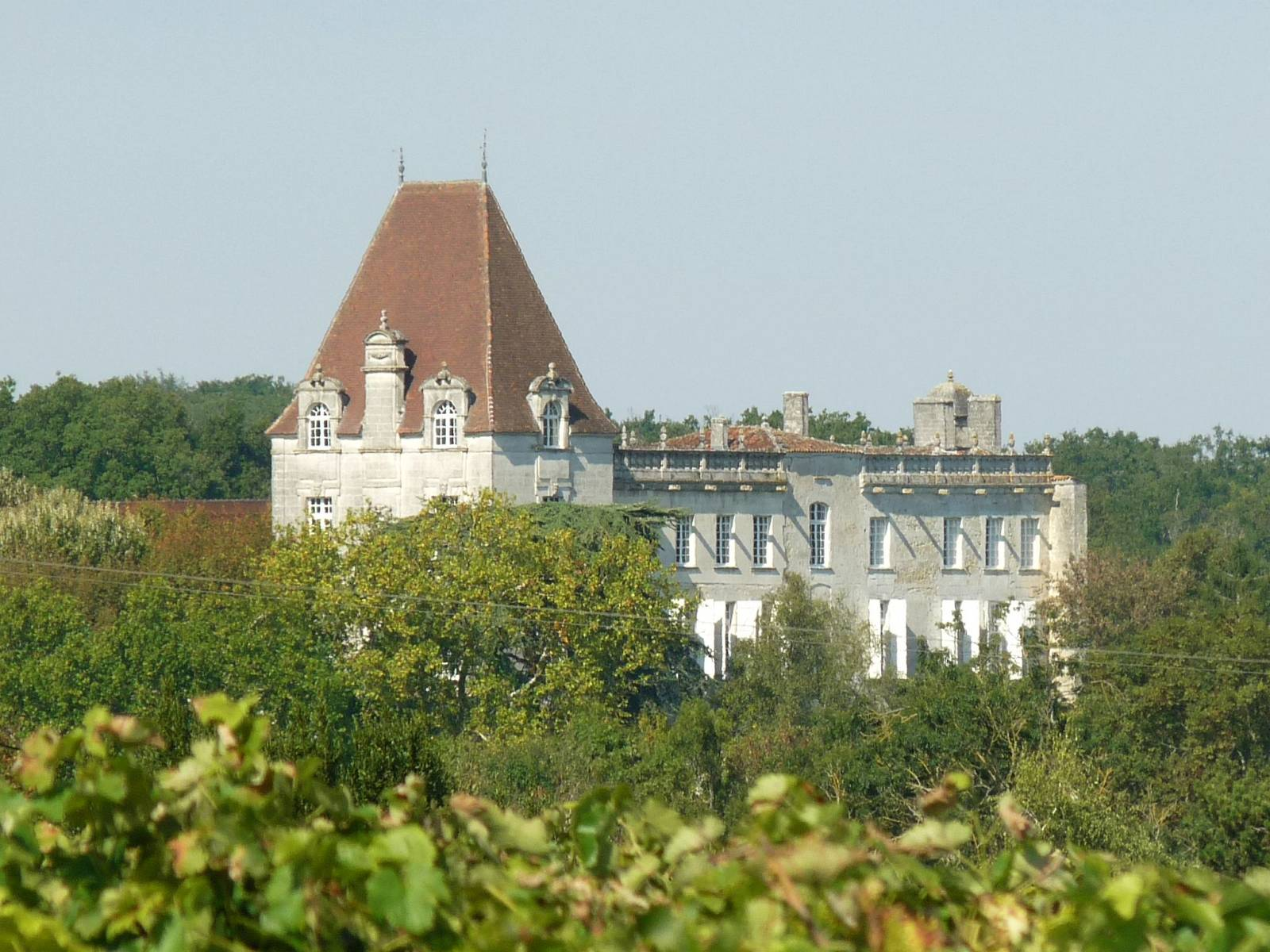
- Château de Bourg-Charente in 2009

Location
- Coordinates: 45°40′24″N 0°13′38″W

Château de Bourg-Charente is a 17th-century castle built on the rocky promontory overlooking the Charente River in the town of Bourg-Charente, Charente department in southwestern France. The castle replaced the former castle destroyed during the Hundred Years' War.

== History ==
In 1262, Bourg belonged to the Ollivier family. In 1363 Messire Ollivier, Baron de Bourg, paid homage to the Prince of Wales, as the castle of Bourg-Charente was an English possession. The castle passed to the families Bragier, Gouffier, Pons de Pon, the count of Miossens.

The current castle was built by Pons de Pons, to replace the castle destroyed in 1378 by Marshal Sancerre whilst taking it back from the English. A Camus of Neville was the last Lord.

In 1921, the castle was bought by the family Marnier-Lapostolle to install cellars for the storage of cognac, necessary for the development of Grand Marnier. Since 2012 stills were installed for the distillation of bitter oranges used in the recipe of Grand Marnier liqueurs.
