= Saint-Georges-lès-Baillargeaux =

French commune

- Commune
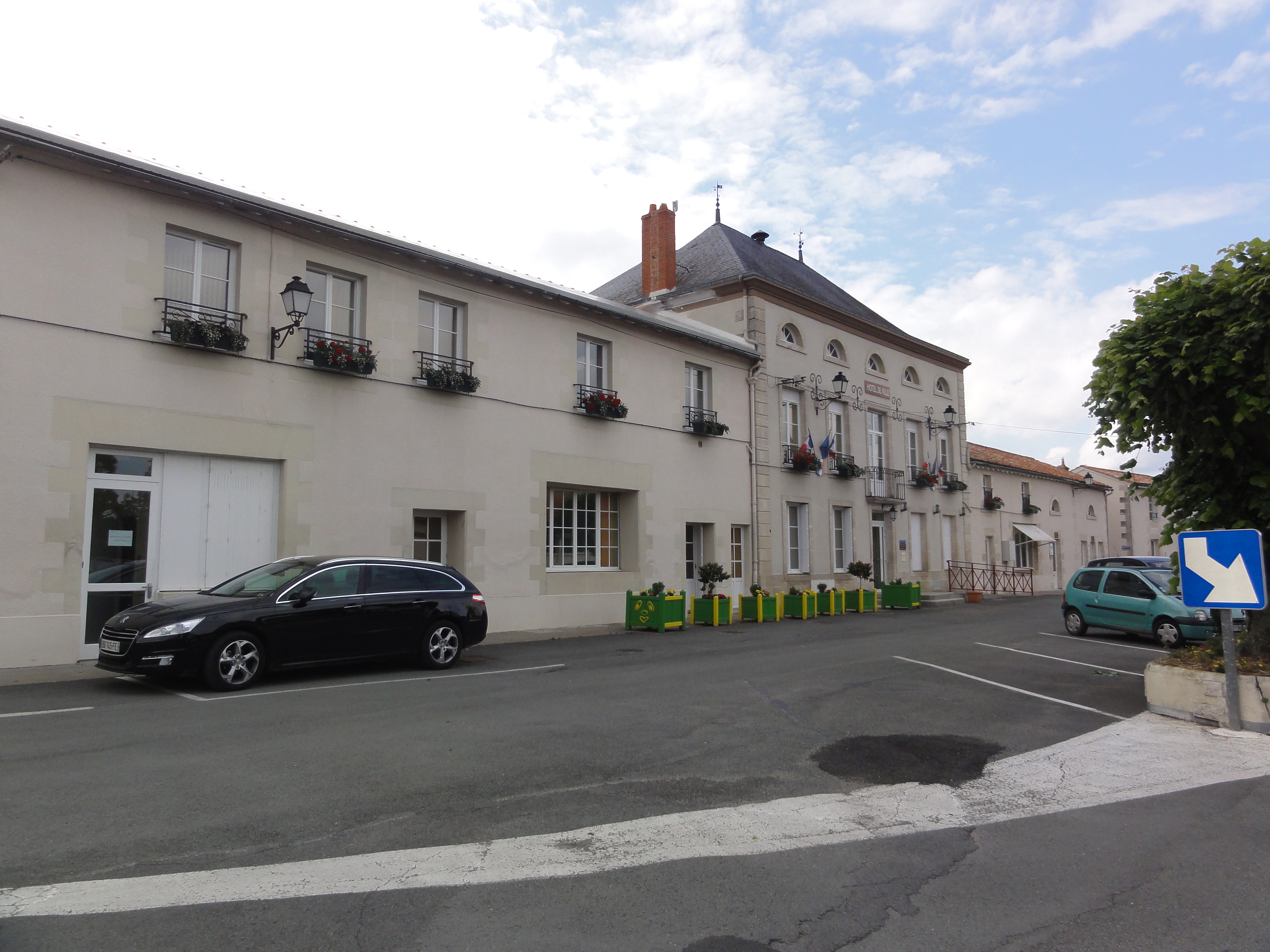
- The town hall and school in Saint-Georges-lès-Baillargeaux

- Coat of arms
- Location of Saint-Georges-lès-Baillargeaux
- Location within France Location within Nouvelle-Aquitaine
- Coordinates: 46°40′18″N 0°24′03″E
- Country: France
- Region: Nouvelle-Aquitaine
- Department: Vienne
- Arrondissement: Poitiers
- Canton: Jaunay-Marigny
- Intercommunality: CU Grand Poitiers

Government
  - Mayor (2020–2026): Éric Ghirlanda
- Area^{1}: 33.90 km^{2} (13.09 sq mi)
- Elevation: 102 m (335 ft)
- Highest elevation: 143 m (469 ft)
- Lowest elevation: 61 m (200 ft)
- Population (2023): 4,385
  - Density: 129.4/km^{2} (335.0/sq mi)
- Time zone: UTC+01:00 (CET)
  - Summer (DST): UTC+02:00 (CEST)
- INSEE/Postal code: 86222 /86130
- ^{1} French Land Register data, which excludes lakes, ponds, glaciers > 1 km^{2} (0.386 sq mi or 247 acres) and river estuaries.

Saint-Georges-lès-Baillargeaux (French pronunciation: [sɛ̃ ʒɔʁʒ lɛ bajaʁʒo]) is a commune in the Vienne department in the Nouvelle-Aquitaine region in western France.

== Population ==
Historical population
Year	Pop.	±% p.a.
1968	1,542	—
1975	2,050	+4.15%
1982	2,447	+2.56%
1990	2,858	+1.96%
1999	3,176	+1.18%
2007	3,681	+1.86%
2012	3,971	+1.53%
2017	4,168	+0.97%
2023	4,385	+0.85%
Source: INSEE

== Places and monuments ==
The Château de Vayres dates back to the 15th and 16th centuries. The facade and roof have been listed as historical monuments since 1959. The garden was classified in 1966 and the castle's dovecote in 1994. Situated to the west of the D 4 road, the castle occupies the slopes leading to the Clain River.

== See also ==
- Communes of the Vienne department
