= Château de la Mothe-Chandeniers =

Castle in Les Trois-Moutiers, France

- Les Trois-Moutiers
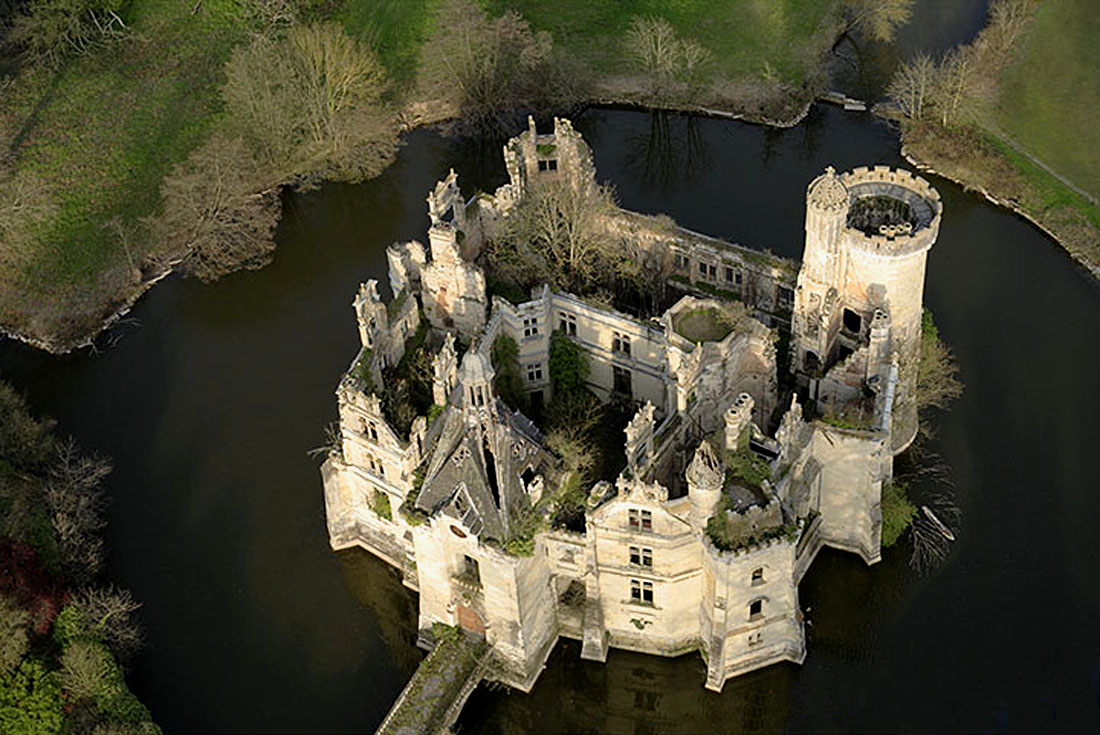
- Bird's eye view of Château de la Mothe-Chandeniers

Site information
- Type: Château
- Open to the public: Seasonally
- Condition: Ruin
- Website: www.mothe-chandeniers.com

Location
- Location within France Location within Vienne
- Coordinates: 47.0923°N 0.0326°E

Site history
- Built: 13th century
- Materials: Stone
- Demolished: Abandoned in 1932

The Château de la Mothe-Chandeniers is a ruined castle in the commune of Les Trois-Moutiers in the Vienne department of France.

== History ==
The stronghold dates to the thirteenth century and was originally called Motte Bauçay (or Baussay). The castle is a former stronghold of the Bauçay family, lords of Loudun. The Motte Baussay was taken several times by the English during the Hundred Years' War and devastated during the French Revolution.

It was bought in 1809 by François Hennecart, a wealthy businessman, and then sold to Baron Joseph Lejeune in 1857. However, a fire in 1932 destroyed most of the buildings in the castle, which then became abandoned.

In December 2017, a French startup organized a crowdfunding campaign site, and 27,190 people having to pay at least €50 each joined the cause, raising €1,600,000, to purchase the castle with the aim of preserving it.

The castle was the subject of a project by the French photographer Roman Veillon in his book Green urbex: Le monde sans nous.

== See also ==
- List of castles in France
