= Saint-Genest-d'Ambière =

- Commune
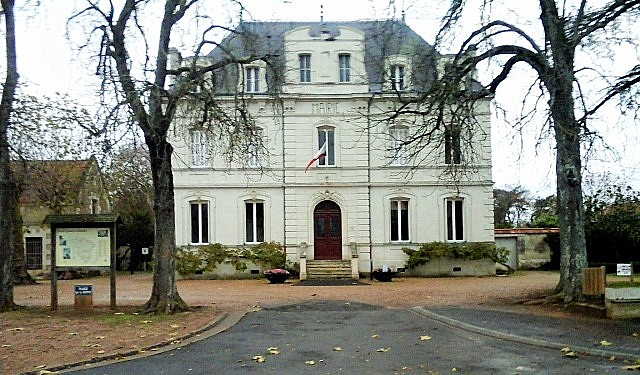
- Town hall
- Location of Saint-Genest-d'Ambière
- Location within France Location within Nouvelle-Aquitaine
- Coordinates: 46°49′15″N 0°22′06″E
- Country: France
- Region: Nouvelle-Aquitaine
- Department: Vienne
- Arrondissement: Châtellerault
- Canton: Châtellerault-1
- Intercommunality: CA Grand Châtellerault

Government
  - Mayor (2020–2026): Pascal Leclerc
- Area^{1}: 32.06 km^{2} (12.38 sq mi)
- Elevation: 110 m (360 ft)
- Highest elevation: 161 m (528 ft)
- Lowest elevation: 64 m (210 ft)
- Population (2023): 1,235
  - Density: 38.52/km^{2} (99.77/sq mi)
- Time zone: UTC+01:00 (CET)
  - Summer (DST): UTC+02:00 (CEST)
- INSEE/Postal code: 86221 /86140
- ^{1} French Land Register data, which excludes lakes, ponds, glaciers > 1 km^{2} (0.386 sq mi or 247 acres) and river estuaries.

Saint-Genest-d'Ambière (French pronunciation: [sɛ̃ ʒənɛ dɑ̃bjɛʁ]) is a commune in the Vienne department in the Nouvelle-Aquitaine region in western France.

== Demographics ==
Historical population
Year	Pop.	±% p.a.
1968	1,106	—
1975	1,067	−0.51%
1982	1,105	+0.50%
1990	1,105	+0.00%
1999	1,143	+0.38%
2007	1,210	+0.71%
2012	1,258	+0.78%
2017	1,248	−0.16%
2023	1,235	−0.17%
Source: INSEE

== See also ==
- Communes of the Vienne department
