= Château de la Roche Courbon =

Large château in France

Coordinates: 45°50′10″N 0°46′53″W

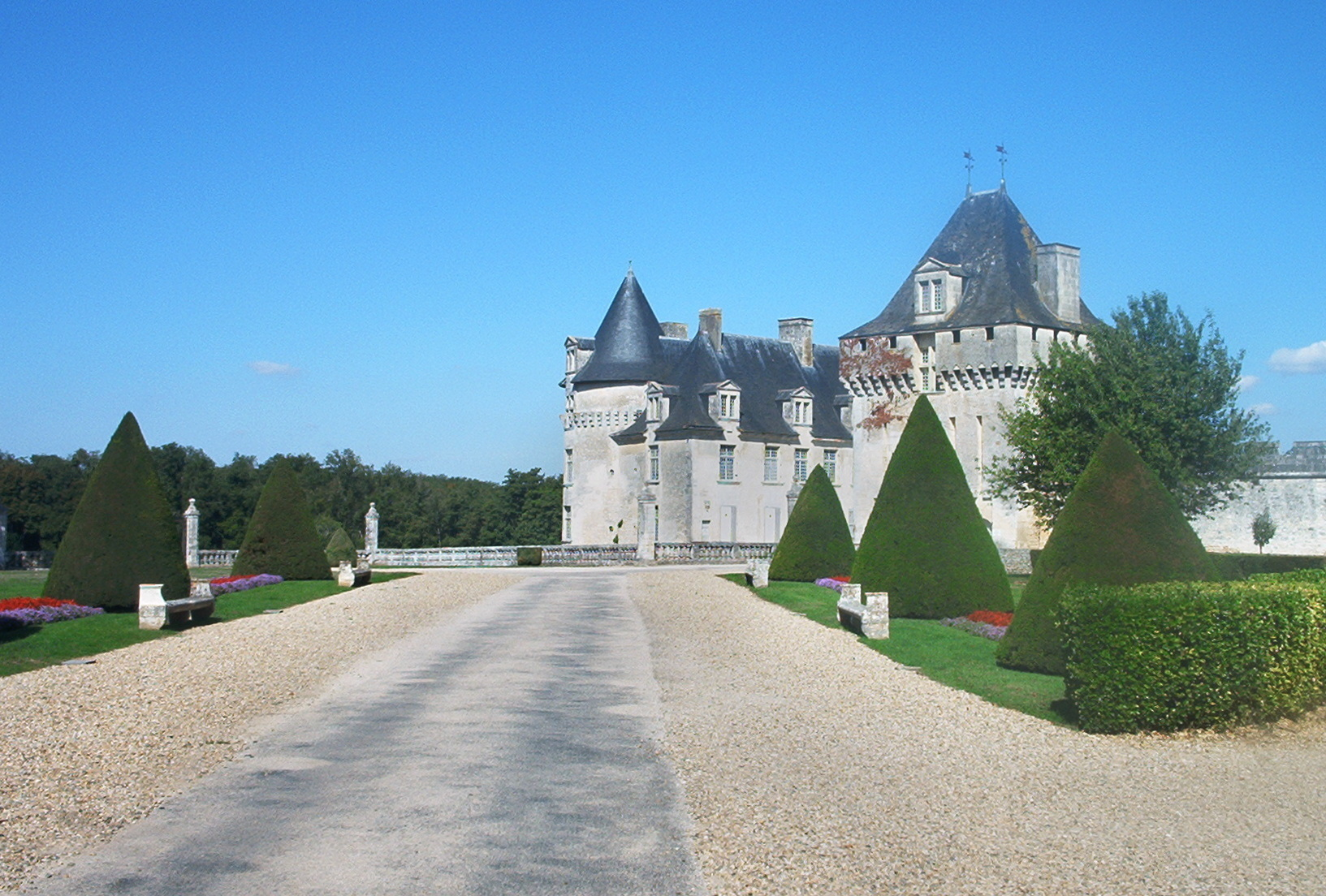
The Château entrance

Château de la Roche Courbon is a large château, developed from an earlier castle, in the Charente-Maritime département of France. It is in the commune of Saint-Porchaire between Saintes and Rochefort. The château is privately owned, and classified as a historic monument. The garden is listed by the French Ministry of Culture as one of the Notable Gardens of France, and also a historic monument.

== History ==
A castle was built around 1475 by Jehan de Latour, on site which had been inhabited since prehistoric times. In the 17th century, the Courbon family, which had occupied the castle for two centuries, transformed it into a more comfortable residence. More alterations were made in the 18th century, but it was eventually sold in 1817 and then abandoned. It was purchased in 1920 by Paul Chénereau, who restored the château and its gardens. The château is still owned and inhabited by his descendants.

Built in the 15th century, upon a rocky outcrop in the midst of marshland, the original castle was transformed into an elegant residence by Jean-Louis de Courbon, during the 17th century. As the marquis would not flee during the French Revolution, the château was not sold. His daughter Charlotte married an aide de camp of Napoleon. Because upkeep was so expensive, however, the château became abandoned during the following hundred years.

== Description ==
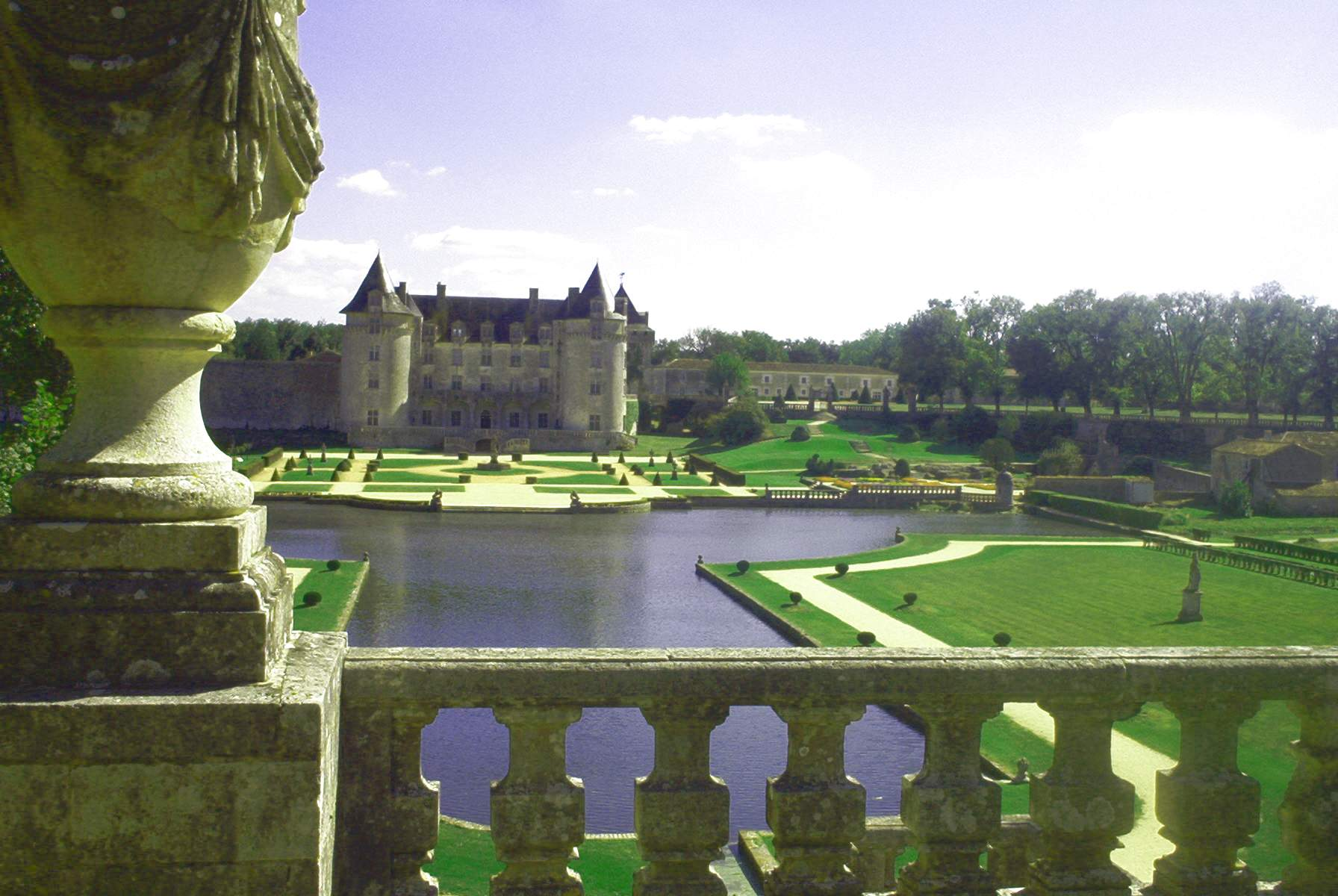
The mirror pond

The interior of the château contains decor from the 17th century, in particular a bathroom covered with painted wood panels and sculptures from 1662,

The château has a jardin à la française, redone in 1936–1939, featuring a terrace with an Italian gallery, a monumental stairway, a parterre with four compartments and a fountain, topiary, and statues. The property is entered via the Porte des Lions, an imposing 17th century edifice. Inside the moat is the keep, an ancient machicolated tower.

The gardens include orchard, flower garden, geometrical flower beds and lawns surrounding a small lake ('mirror pool'). The River Bruant flows through the gardens, feeding the water features. Beyond that, an ornamental staircase leads to higher ground, on the far side of the river. The gardens were laid out on marshes, and in addition to drainage improvements it was necessary to support part of them on deep piles driven through the marshland to the sandstone bedrock; these required considerable and very costly attention in the 1930s refurbishment and again in the 1990s.

In the grounds are some Stone Age cave dwellings, at the base of sandstone cliffs, in woodland close by the river Bruant. Prehistoric finds from the site are housed in the keep museum.

== Owners ==
Pierre Loti (1850–1923) spent holidays with his sister in the Saintonge region. On his excursions, he (re)discovered the Château de la Rochecourbon, in an abandoned and ruined state, overgrown with brushwood. Benefiting from his fame, Pierre Loti brought the château to notice by calling it the "sleeping beauty of the forest" and launched a public appeal to save it and its forest.

Paul Chénereau (1869–1967), a local man, bought the château and restored it to its former splendour.
