= Château de Sanzay =

French historic castle

Coordinates: 46°57′37″N 0°26′27″W

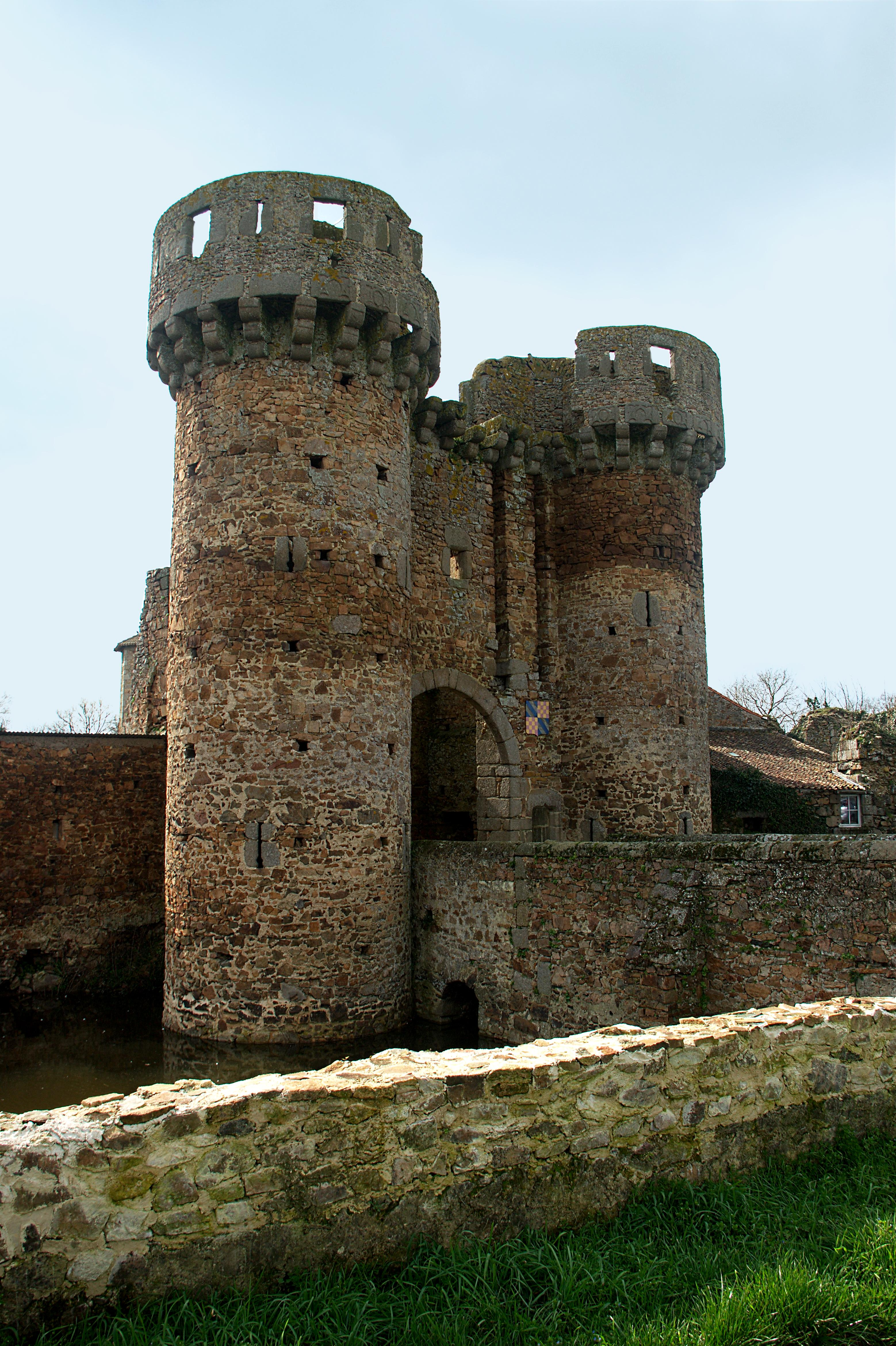
Entrance

The Château de Sanzay is a ruined castle located near the village of Sanzay, in the commune of Argenton-les-Vallées in the Deux-Sèvres département of France. The castle was constructed in the 13th century, but only parts of it remain.

== History ==
The history of the Château de Sanzay is essentially that of the Sanzay family. Few documents testify directly to its construction or its use. Thus the archaeological study of the whole of the remains takes on a real importance and constrains researchers to put forth assumptions of whose validity may only be tested by research on the ground.

Still existing are the chapel, gateway and remains of the fortifications. It has been listed since 1930 as a monument historique by the French Ministry of Culture.

== See also ==
- List of castles in France
