= Château de l'Oisellerie =

Coordinates: 45°37′30″N 0°06′15″E

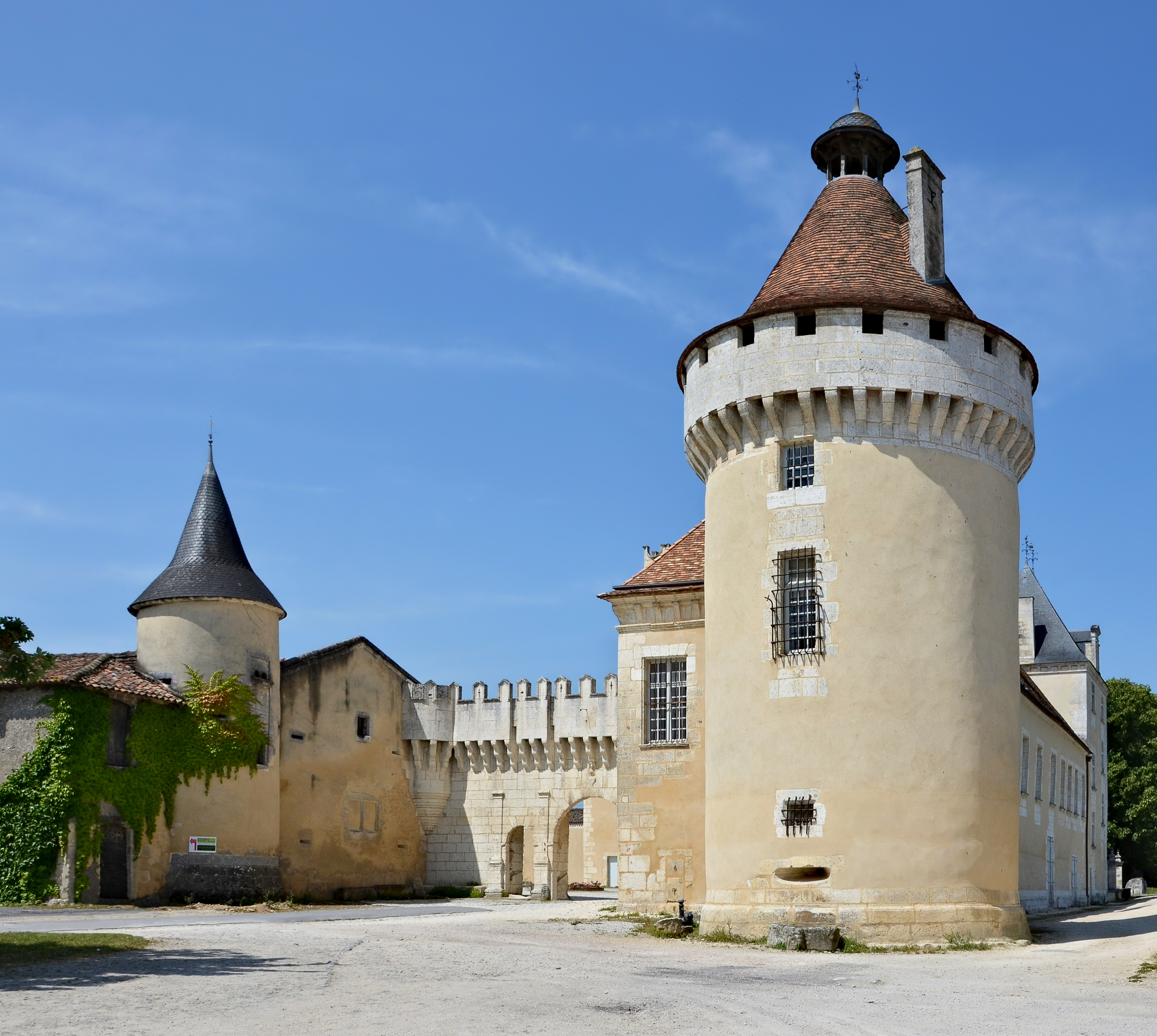
Château de l'Oisellerie

The Château de l'Oisellerie is located in the municipality of La Couronne, near Angoulême in Charente. It houses the agricultural college of Oisellerie and the department's Centre for Educational Documentation.

L’Oisellerie was a fief belonging to the abbey of la Couronne and later could have been the falconry. After the Hundred Years' War, the farm was rented to wealthy burghers, who had to perform homage to the abbot. The castle was built at the end of the 15th century when it was in the hands of Arnauld Calluaud thanks to money given by his brother Jean VI, commendatory abbot of la Couronne. King Francis I stayed there in 1526. The Calluaud sold it in 1678. The castle, which was modified in the 18th century, has been a listed building since 1911. It is now a multimedia library (CCDP).

== Bibliography ==
- BLANCHET, “Histoire de l’abbaye de la Couronne”,Mémoires SAHC, 1887–1888
- Château, logis et demeures anciennes de la Charente, Bruno Sepulchre, 1993, p. 361-365
- Revue VMF, n° 125, 1988 /
