= Château du Bois de Sanzay =

Château in Nouvelle-Aquitaine, France

Coordinates: 47°03′54″N 0°11′11″W

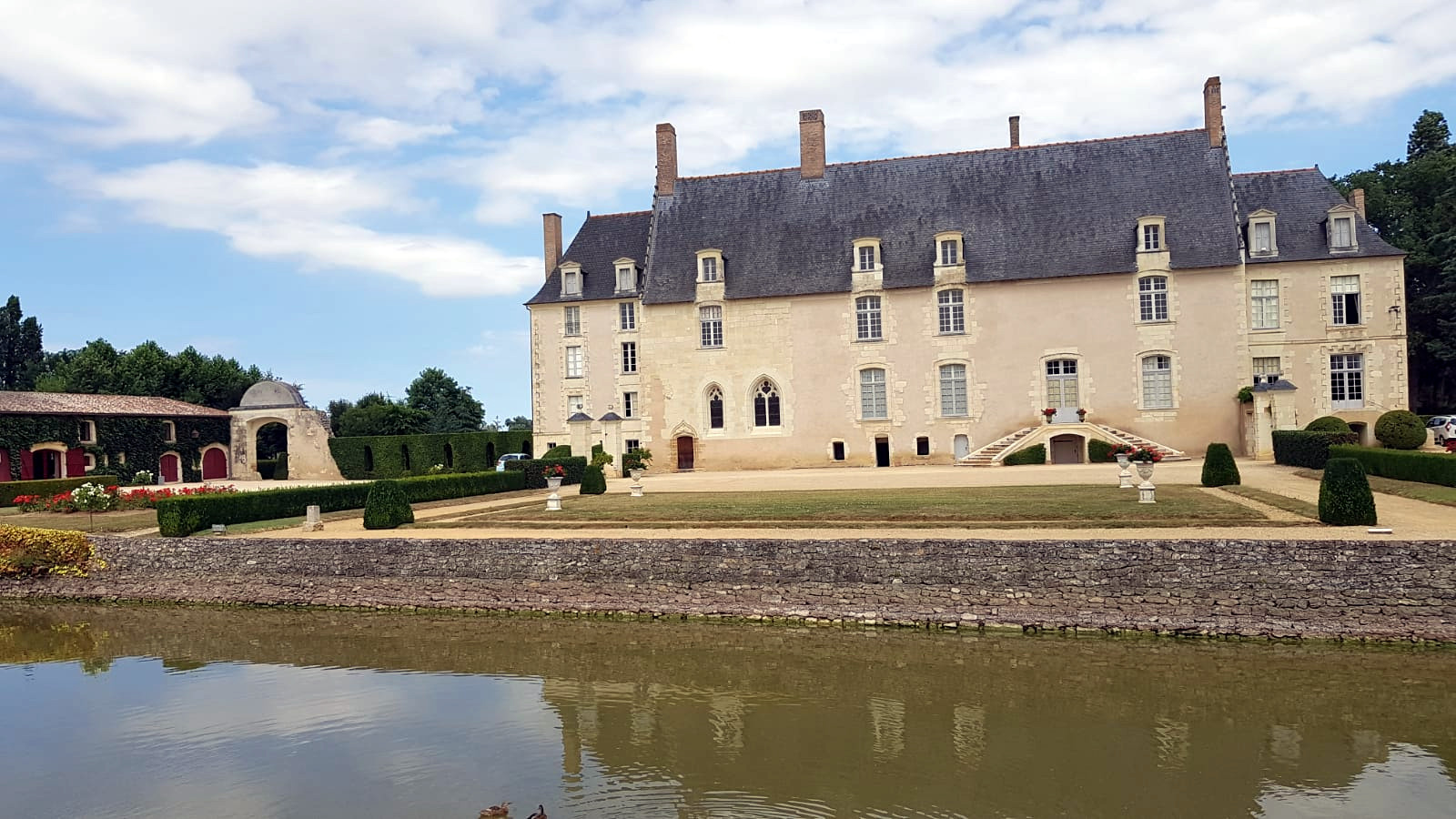
Château du Bois de Sanzay

The Château du Bois de Sanzay is located in Saint-Martin-de-Sanzay, between Thouars and Saumur.

== History ==
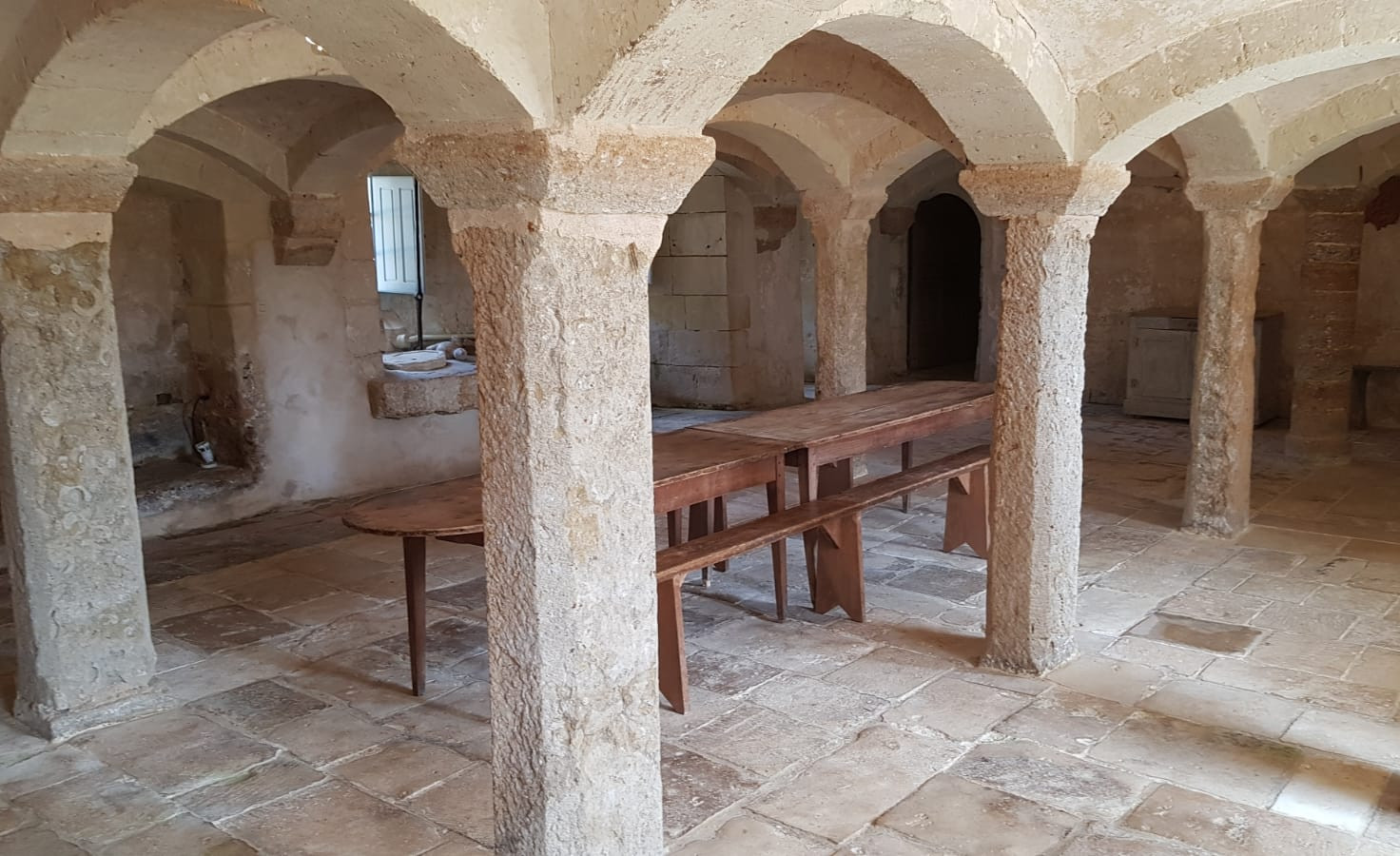
Basement

According to documents of the Saint Laon de Thouars abbey, in 1487 the land was bought from the clergy by "François de Beaumont, chevalier Seigneur du Boys de Sanzay". The central building was built in the 15th century, and additions were made in the 18th century.

== Architecture ==
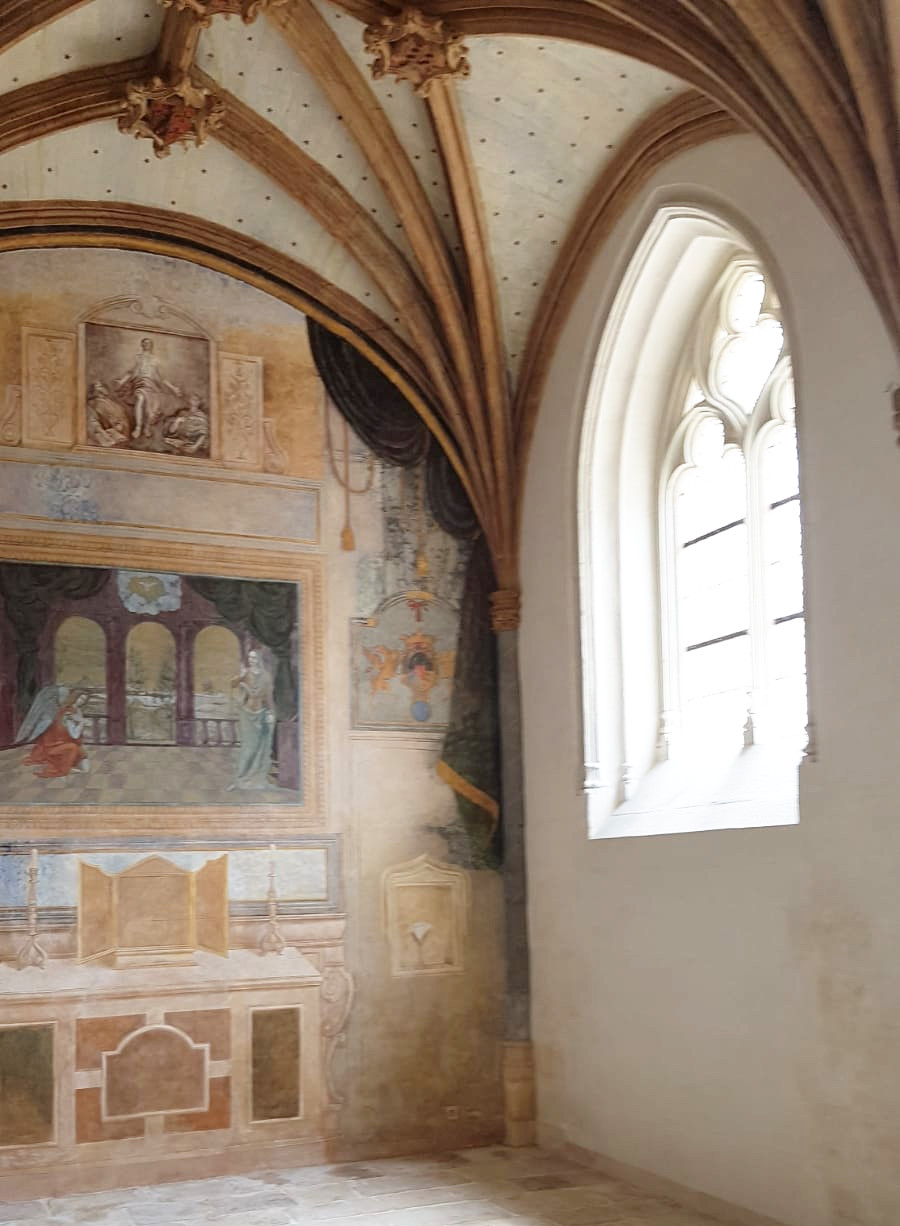
Chapel

Built using large blocks of tufa stone for some parts and rubble for other parts, the main building has high chimneys, three monumental gothic fireplaces, an échauguette, a chapel, and cellars. The domain also comprises a dovecote, a French formal garden, and a pond.

== See also ==
- List of castles in France
