= Saivres =

- Commune
- Location of Saivres
- Location within France Location within Nouvelle-Aquitaine
- Coordinates: 46°25′57″N 0°14′09″W
- Country: France
- Region: Nouvelle-Aquitaine
- Department: Deux-Sèvres
- Arrondissement: Niort
- Canton: Saint-Maixent-l'École

Government
  - Mayor (2020–2026): Dominique Payet
- Area^{1}: 21.24 km^{2} (8.20 sq mi)
- Elevation: 130 m (430 ft)
- Highest elevation: 185 m (607 ft)
- Lowest elevation: 52 m (171 ft)
- Population (2023): 1,306
  - Density: 61.49/km^{2} (159.3/sq mi)
- Time zone: UTC+01:00 (CET)
  - Summer (DST): UTC+02:00 (CEST)
- INSEE/Postal code: 79302 /79400
- ^{1} French Land Register data, which excludes lakes, ponds, glaciers > 1 km^{2} (0.386 sq mi or 247 acres) and river estuaries.

Saivres (French pronunciation: [sɛvʁ]) is a commune in the Deux-Sèvres department in western France.

Its inhabitants are known as "Saputiens" or "Saputiennes".

== See also ==
- Communes of the Deux-Sèvres department
