= Vouneuil-sur-Vienne =

- Commune
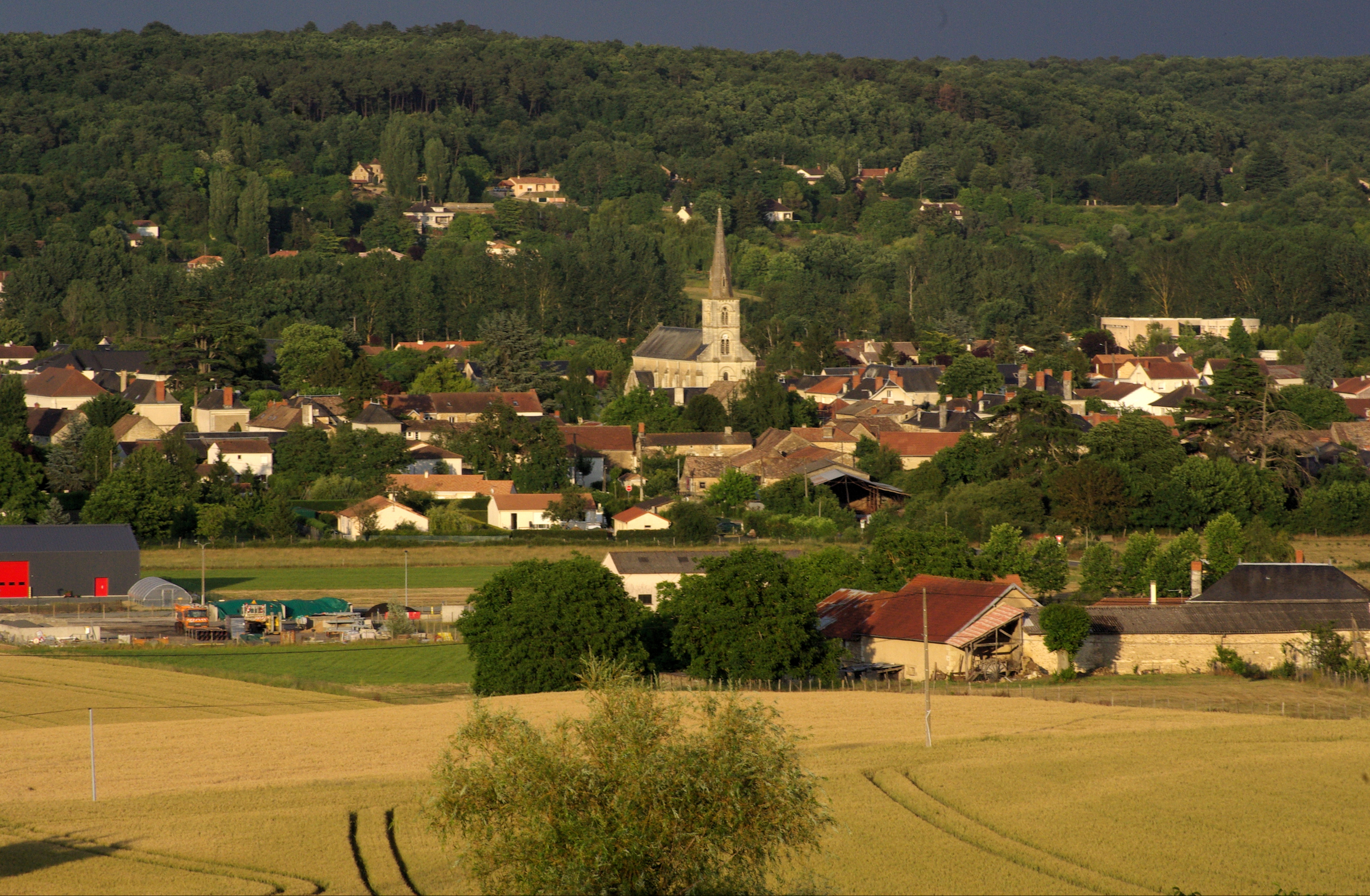
- The church and surrounding buildings in Vouneuil-sur-Vienne
- Location of Vouneuil-sur-Vienne
- Location within France Location within Nouvelle-Aquitaine
- Coordinates: 46°43′04″N 0°32′27″E
- Country: France
- Region: Nouvelle-Aquitaine
- Department: Vienne
- Arrondissement: Châtellerault
- Canton: Chauvigny
- Intercommunality: CA Grand Châtellerault

Government
  - Mayor (2020–2026): Johnny Boisson
- Area^{1}: 36.8 km^{2} (14.2 sq mi)
- Elevation: 82 m (269 ft)
- Highest elevation: 139 m (456 ft)
- Lowest elevation: 47 m (154 ft)
- Population (2023): 2,277
  - Density: 61.9/km^{2} (160/sq mi)
- Time zone: UTC+01:00 (CET)
  - Summer (DST): UTC+02:00 (CEST)
- INSEE/Postal code: 86298 /86210
- ^{1} French Land Register data, which excludes lakes, ponds, glaciers > 1 km^{2} (0.386 sq mi or 247 acres) and river estuaries.

Vouneuil-sur-Vienne (French pronunciation: [vunœj syʁ vjɛn], literally Vouneuil on Vienne) is a commune in the Vienne department in the Nouvelle-Aquitaine region in western France.

== History ==
The Battle of Tours took place in 732 near the hamlet of Moussais (later renamed Moussais-la-Bataille), which is now part of the commune of Vouneuil-sur-Vienne.

== Demographics ==
Historical population
Year	Pop.	±% p.a.
1968	1,257	—
1975	1,218	−0.45%
1982	1,458	+2.60%
1990	1,606	+1.22%
1999	1,835	+1.49%
2007	1,910	+0.50%
2012	2,031	+1.24%
2017	2,198	+1.59%
2023	2,277	+0.59%
Source: INSEE

== See also ==
- Communes of the Vienne department
