= Les Trois-Moutiers =

- Commune
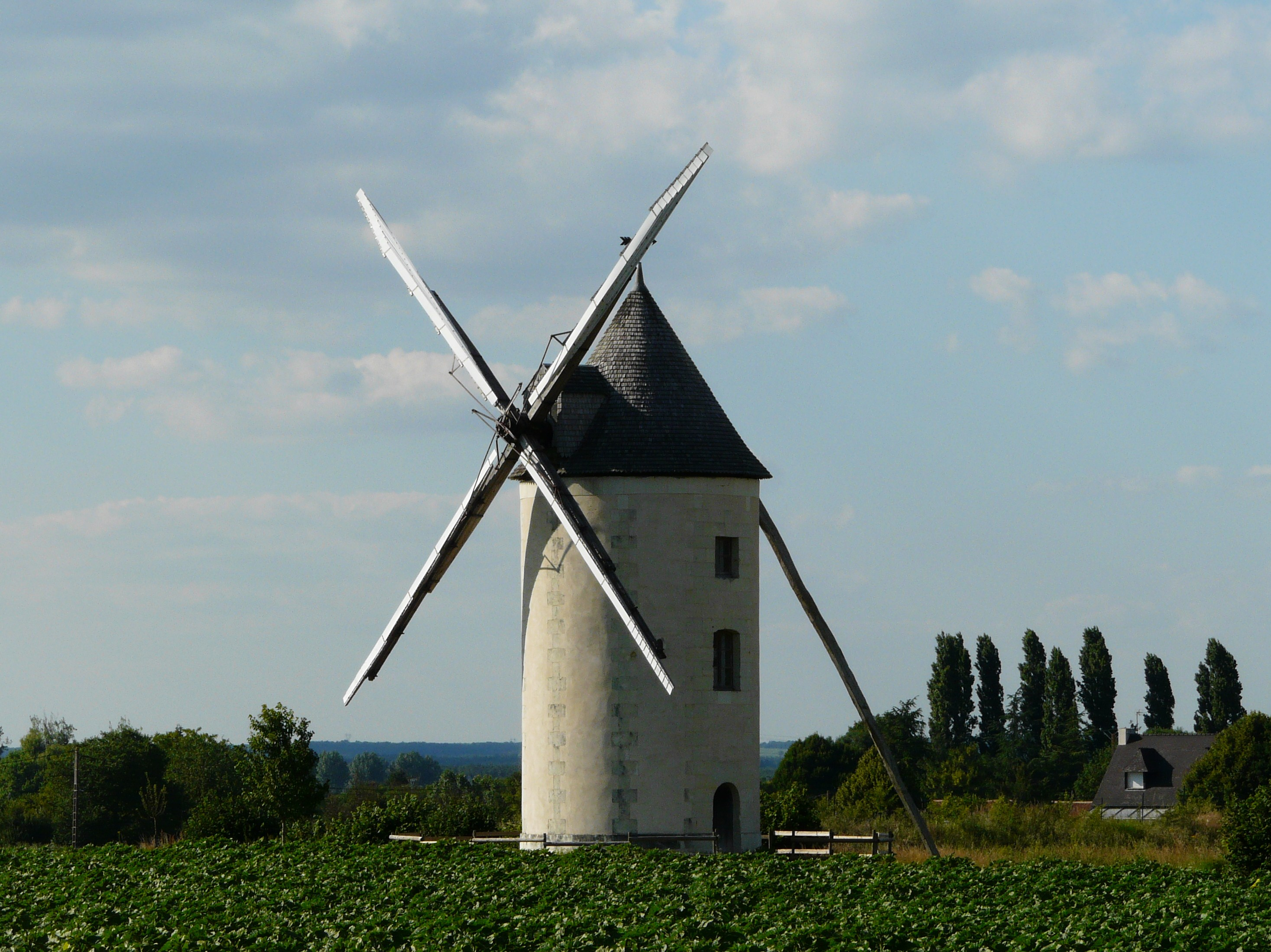
- The windmill at the Saint-Marie ford

- Coat of arms
- Location of Les Trois-Moutiers
- Location within France Location within Nouvelle-Aquitaine
- Coordinates: 47°03′49″N 0°01′18″E
- Country: France
- Region: Nouvelle-Aquitaine
- Department: Vienne
- Arrondissement: Châtellerault
- Canton: Loudun
- Intercommunality: Pays Loudunais

Government
  - Mayor (2024–2026): Bernard Sonneville-Coupe
- Area^{1}: 35.94 km^{2} (13.88 sq mi)
- Elevation: 48 m (157 ft)
- Highest elevation: 123 m (404 ft)
- Lowest elevation: 32 m (105 ft)
- Population (2023): 1,078
  - Density: 29.99/km^{2} (77.69/sq mi)
- Time zone: UTC+01:00 (CET)
  - Summer (DST): UTC+02:00 (CEST)
- INSEE/Postal code: 86274 /86120
- ^{1} French Land Register data, which excludes lakes, ponds, glaciers > 1 km^{2} (0.386 sq mi or 247 acres) and river estuaries.

Les Trois-Moutiers (French pronunciation: [le tʁwɑ mutje]) is a commune in the Vienne department in the Nouvelle-Aquitaine region in western France.

== Demographics ==
Historical population
Year	Pop.	±% p.a.
1968	1,002	—
1975	869	−2.01%
1982	847	−0.37%
1990	899	+0.75%
1999	927	+0.34%
2007	960	+0.44%
2012	1,087	+2.52%
2017	1,074	−0.24%
2023	1,078	+0.06%
Source: INSEE

== See also ==
- Communes of the Vienne department
