= Saint-Dizant-du-Gua =

- Commune
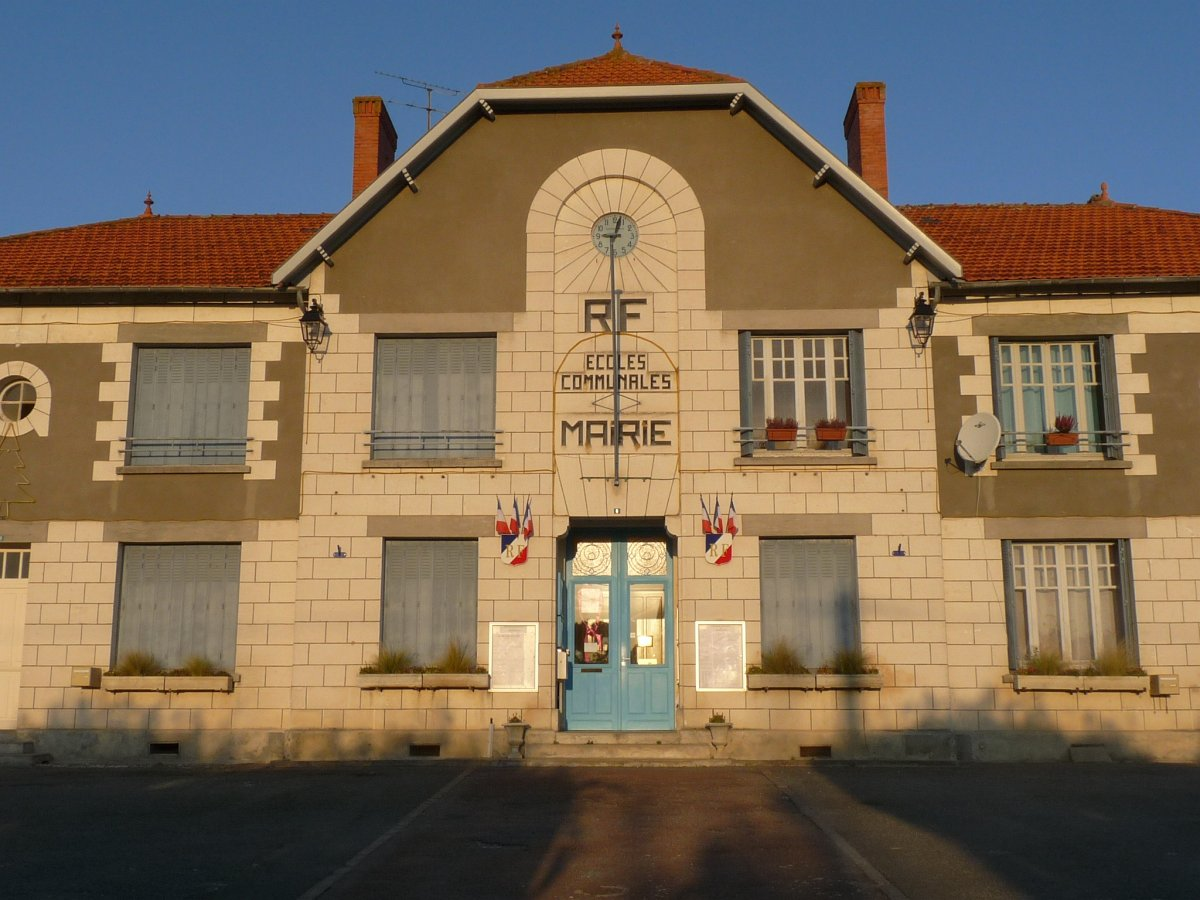
- The town hall in Saint-Dizant-du-Gua
- Location of Saint-Dizant-du-Gua
- Location within France Location within Nouvelle-Aquitaine
- Coordinates: 45°25′56″N 0°42′14″W
- Country: France
- Region: Nouvelle-Aquitaine
- Department: Charente-Maritime
- Arrondissement: Jonzac
- Canton: Pons
- Intercommunality: Haute-Saintonge

Government
  - Mayor (2020–2026): Jean-François Mazzocchi
- Area^{1}: 18.44 km^{2} (7.12 sq mi)
- Elevation: 16 m (52 ft)
- Highest elevation: 62 m (203 ft)
- Lowest elevation: 2 m (6.6 ft)
- Population (2023): 499
  - Density: 27.1/km^{2} (70.1/sq mi)
- Time zone: UTC+01:00 (CET)
  - Summer (DST): UTC+02:00 (CEST)
- INSEE/Postal code: 17325 /17240
- ^{1} French Land Register data, which excludes lakes, ponds, glaciers > 1 km^{2} (0.386 sq mi or 247 acres) and river estuaries.

Saint-Dizant-du-Gua (French pronunciation: [sɛ̃ dizɑ̃ dy ɡa]) is a commune in the Charente-Maritime department in southwestern France.

== Population ==
Historical population
Year	Pop.	±% p.a.
1968	790	—
1975	699	−1.73%
1982	606	−2.02%
1990	584	−0.46%
1999	548	−0.70%
2007	541	−0.16%
2012	534	−0.26%
2017	533	−0.04%
2023	499	−1.09%
Source: INSEE

== See also ==
- Communes of the Charente-Maritime department
