= Château de Ternay =

Château in Poitou, France

Coordinates: 47°2′21″N 0°2′29″W

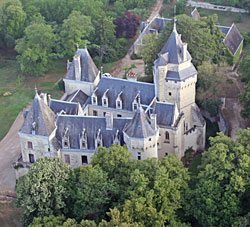
Château de Ternay (Vienne)

The Château de Ternay in the Loire Valley in the province of Poitou (Nouvelle-Aquitaine, France) was built by the Aviau de Ternay family. In twelfth-century foundations, the present château is the result of building campaigns from the fifteenth to the seventeenth centuries.

Charles Louis d'Arsac, Chevalier de Ternay (1722–1780), styled Chevalier de Ternay, born at the château, escorted the French troops of Rochambeau to join the American Revolution. Felled by a fever, he is buried in Trinity churchyard, Newport, Rhode Island.

Still the seat of the Comte and Comtesse de Ternay, today the château is open for tours and overnight guests.

It has been listed as a Monument historique since 1996.
