= Étagnac =

- Commune
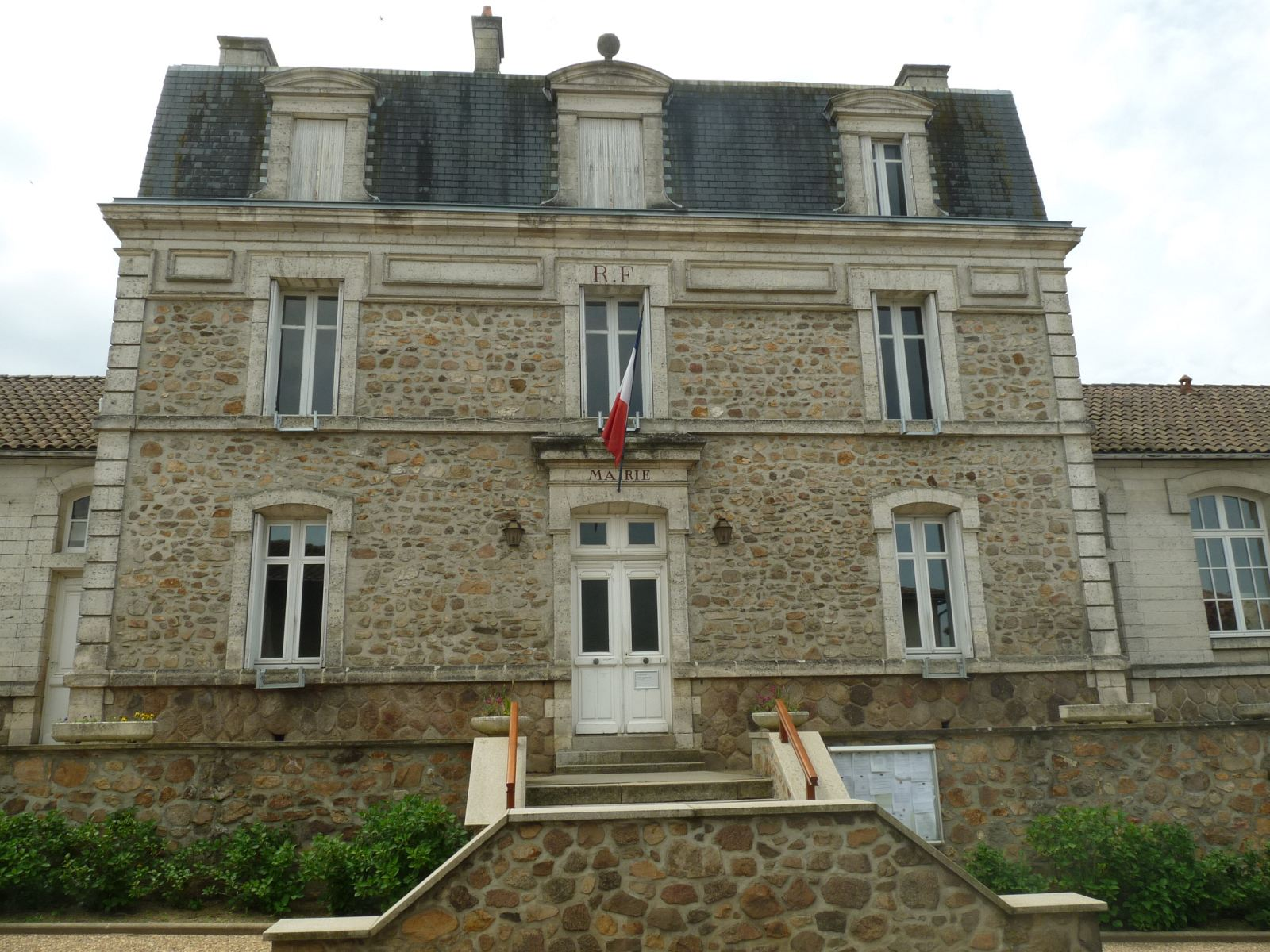
- Town hall

- Coat of arms
- Location of Étagnac
- Location within France Location within Nouvelle-Aquitaine
- Coordinates: 45°53′44″N 0°46′47″E
- Country: France
- Region: Nouvelle-Aquitaine
- Department: Charente
- Arrondissement: Confolens
- Canton: Charente-Vienne

Government
  - Mayor (2020–2026): Henri de Richemont
- Area^{1}: 29.23 km^{2} (11.29 sq mi)
- Elevation: 228 m (748 ft)
- Highest elevation: 284 m (932 ft)
- Lowest elevation: 150 m (490 ft)
- Population (2023): 982
  - Density: 33.6/km^{2} (87.0/sq mi)
- Time zone: UTC+01:00 (CET)
  - Summer (DST): UTC+02:00 (CEST)
- INSEE/Postal code: 16132 /16150
- ^{1} French Land Register data, which excludes lakes, ponds, glaciers > 1 km^{2} (0.386 sq mi or 247 acres) and river estuaries.

Étagnac (French pronunciation: [etaɲak]; Limousin: Estanhac, [estaˈɲak]) is a commune in the department of Charente, region of Nouvelle-Aquitaine, southwestern France.

== Population ==
Historical population
Year	Pop.	±% p.a.
1968	950	—
1975	910	−0.61%
1982	966	+0.86%
1990	949	−0.22%
1999	981	+0.37%
2007	987	+0.08%
2012	945	−0.87%
2017	991	+0.96%
2023	982	−0.15%
Source: INSEE

== See also ==
- Rochechouart impact structure
- Communes of the Charente department
