= Michel Doublet =

French politician (1939–2022)

Member of the French Senate for Charente-Maritime
- In office 1 October 1989 – 30 September 2014

Personal details
- Born: 26 September 1939 Rochefort, France
- Died: 18 August 2022 (aged 82) Trizay, France
- Party: RPR; UMP
- Profession: Farmer

Michel Doublet (26 September 1939 – 18 August 2022) was a French politician, senator from 1989 to 2014 and mayor of Trizay. He represented the Charente-Maritime department and was a member of the Union for a Popular Movement.

== Biography ==
Michel Doublet was born on September 26, 1939.

A farmer by profession, Michel Doublet was elected senator for Charente-Maritime on September 24, 1989, re-elected on September 27, 1998 in the first round (954 votes out of 1,480) and on September 21, 2008, again in the first round (878 votes out of 1,596). He resigned from the Senate on April 21, 2014.

In March 2015, he was elected departmental councilor for the Canton of Saint-Porchaire alongside Brigitte Seguin.

He died on August 18, 2022, in Trizay, the town where he had served as mayor.
