= Gustave Biéler =

French-Canadian spy

- Born: 26 March 1904; Beurlay, France
- Died: 5 September 1944 (aged 40); Flossenbürg concentration camp, Oberpfalz, Bavaria, Germany
- Occupation: special operations agent

Gustave Biéler DSO MBE CdeG (26 March 1904 – 5 September 1944) was a Canadian Special Operations Executive agent during World War II.

== Early life ==
Gustave Daniel Alfred Biéler was born on 26 March 1904 in Beurlay, France, to Swiss parents and raised in Lausanne, Switzerland. At the age of twenty, he emigrated to Canada where he settled in the city of Montreal, working as a school teacher at l'Institut Français Évangélique in Pointe-aux-Trembles, and then as a translator for Sun Life Assurance. He became a naturalised British subject.

== Wartime activities ==
At the outbreak of World War II, although married with two children, Biéler joined the Canadian Army in Le Régiment de Maisonneuve and was shipped to a base in Britain. His wife Marguerite Geymonat worked as a broadcaster to the troops in Europe on Radio Canada International. Because of his familiarity with France and his fluency in the French and English languages he joined the Special Operations Executive in 1942.

Known by his wartime nickname "Guy," or his code name "Commandant Guy", following his specialised training at Camp X, Colonel Maurice Buckmaster, the SOE commander, wrote in his file that Biéler was the best student SOE had.

=== Operations in France ===
On 18 November 1942, Biéler, along with wireless operator Arthur Staggs and Michael Trotobas, were parachuted into France. In the dark of the night, Biéler severely injured his back after landing on rocks and he spent several months recovering.

He had strong communication and organizational skills, and as the head of the Musician network he and fellow SOE agents and members of the French Resistance organized very productive sabotage missions. Operating from a base in Saint-Quentin in the northern Aisne département, Biéler's twenty-five teams, scattered over different areas of northern France, succeeded in damaging or destroying German gasoline storage tanks, rail lines, bridges, canal locks, and the electric tractors used to tow barges on the shipping waterways. Their repeated efforts hampered the movement of enemy arms and troops but the most important job for Biéler would eventually be the preparations for D-Day.

His daughter Jacqueline Bieler researched "Commandant Guy's" life extensively, for her book Out of Night and Fog( published in 2007 by CEF Books, Ottawa, in French and English), and provided the following summary of his escapades in France to the CBC:

One of his jobs was to organize a parachute drop. He had to find reliable people. Then they had to find a field or a landing place. He had to signal London. They would go out in the night and receive the drops and then hide the stuff. The stuff was meant to be hidden away so that when the [Allied] landings came, there would people and organizations to help the Allied soldiers as they came across the land.

He organised the railway workers and the guys who worked on the maintenance of the railways. They would either do something to the tracks to send the train off the rails, or he would supply them with axle grease that had abrasives in it – it would cause the wheels to fall off."

His operations were so successful that the Germans instituted a special manhunt to get him and his team and on the morning of 14 January 1944 the Gestapo arrested him and agent Yolande Beekman in the Café Moulin Brulé in Saint-Quentin. At the Gestapo headquarters there the two were tortured repeatedly but never broke and a few months later Biéler was transferred to Flossenbürg concentration camp in the Oberpfalz region of Bavaria, where the brutal torture continued. According to his daughter Jacqueline Bieler's research, prisoners at Flossenburg were called Nacht und Nebel (Night and Fog). "When you were designated an NN prisoner, you were meant to disappear. If the Red Cross asked questions about you, they weren't supposed to find out anything."

Unable to get useful information from him, the Germans executed Major Guy Biéler by a firing squad – instead of the gas chamber or piano wire often used on other agents – with a guard of honour, on 5 September 1944. "It proves even the Germans could not but recognize his great qualities," according to then-Colonel Maurice Buckmaster, the SOE commander.

== Recognition ==
=== Awards ===
- United Kingdom: Biéler's contribution to freedom was recognised with the Distinguished Service Order (DSO) and he was made a Member of the Order of the British Empire (MBE).
- France: Croix de Guerre In Saint-Quentin, France, he was adopted by the citizens as a folk hero not only for his exploits and bravery but also because he was someone who did everything possible to avoid civilian casualties.

=== Monuments ===
- The "Rue du Commandant Guy Biéler" in Saint-Quentin was named after him.
- As one of the SOE agents who died for the liberation of France, he is listed on the "Roll of Honour" on the Valençay SOE Memorial in the town of Valençay, in the Indre département.
- There are memorials honouring Biéler at Morcourt, and Fonsommes (France)
- The Juno Beach Centre at Courseulles-sur-Mer has a plaque honouring: "Canadians behind enemy lines. Canadian Agents with the British Special Services".
- Major Biéler is recorded on the Groesbeek Memorial in Groesbeek Canadian War Cemetery in the Netherlands.
- There is a Bieler Lake in Canada.
- The veterans' residence in Montreal (Quebec) is named after him.
- Bieler memorial in a park in Westmount (Quebec).
- Bieler was the central character in THE SECRET LIBERATORS, a documentary on Canadians in SOE, written and presented by Norm Christie for History Channel in 2005. Other agents covered in the Documentary are Al Sirois, Frank Pickersgill and John McAllister. Only Sirois survived the war.

=== Exhibition ===
On 22 July 2007, an exhibit on Biéler was unveiled at the opening of the museum in commemoration of all those who suffered and died at the Flossenbürg Camp at Flossenbürg, KZ, Germany.
