= Arrondissement of Saintes =

Coordinates: 45.75°N 0.63°W

Saintes
- Arrondissement
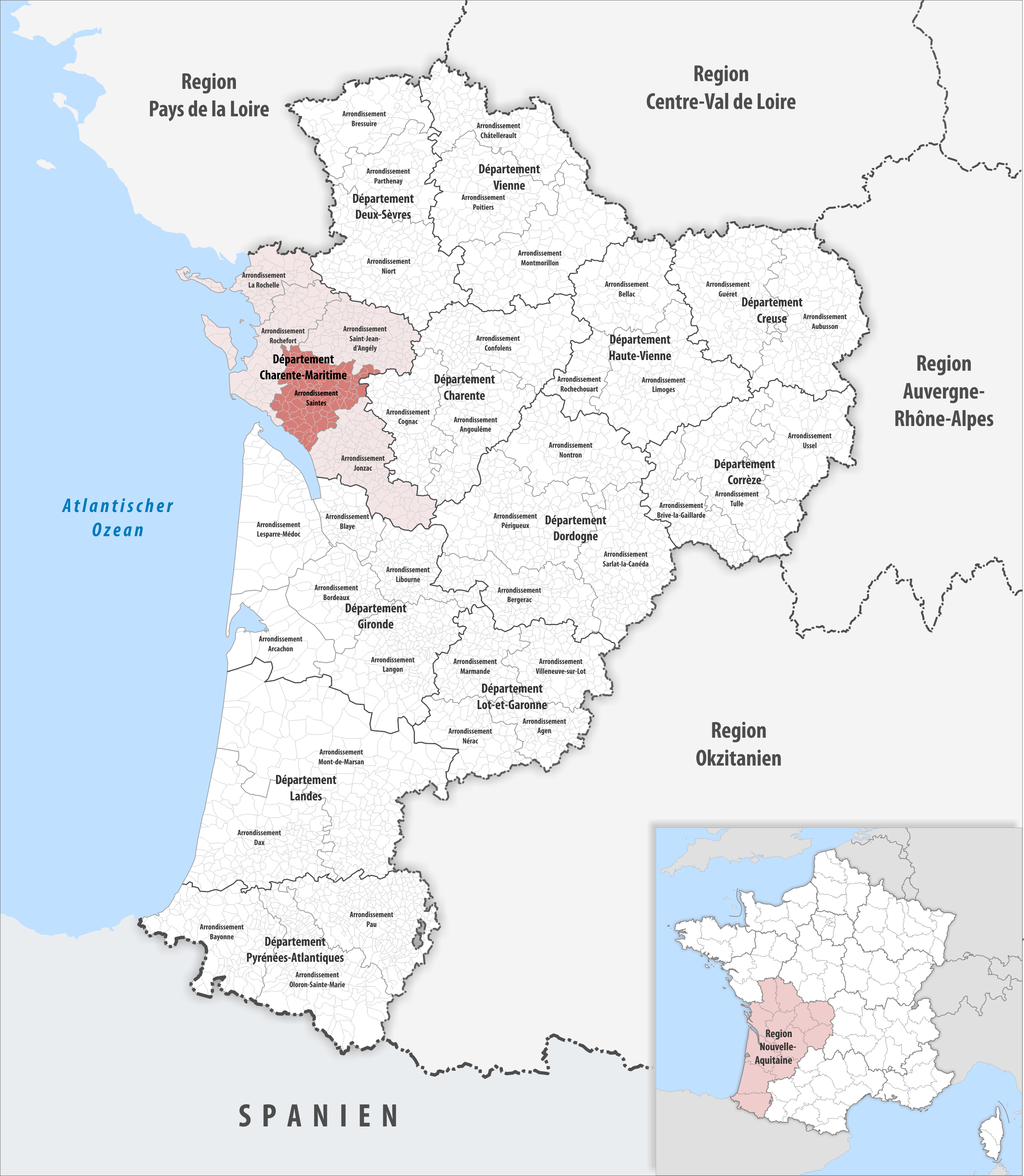
- Location within the region Nouvelle-Aquitaine
- Country: France
- Region: Nouvelle-Aquitaine
- Department: Charente-Maritime
- No. of communes: {{{nbcomm}}}
- Area: 1,320.4 km^{2} (509.8 sq mi)
- Population (2023): 120,058
  - Density: 90.925/km^{2} (235.50/sq mi)
- INSEE code: 174

The arrondissement of Saintes is an arrondissement of France in the Charente-Maritime department in the Nouvelle-Aquitaine region. It has 88 communes. Its population is 118,506 (2021), and its area is 1,320.4 km^{2} (509.8 sq mi).

== Composition ==
The communes of the arrondissement of Saintes, and their INSEE codes, are:

1. Arces (17015)
2. Balanzac (17030)
3. Barzan (17034)
4. Berneuil (17044)
5. Beurlay (17045)
6. Boutenac-Touvent (17060)
7. Brie-sous-Mortagne (17068)
8. Burie (17072)
9. Bussac-sur-Charente (17073)
10. Chaniers (17086)
11. La Chapelle-des-Pots (17089)
12. Le Chay (17097)
13. Chenac-Saint-Seurin-d'Uzet (17098)
14. Chérac (17100)
15. Chermignac (17102)
16. La Clisse (17112)
17. Colombiers (17115)
18. Corme-Écluse (17119)
19. Corme-Royal (17120)
20. Courcoury (17128)
21. Cozes (17131)
22. Cravans (17133)
23. Crazannes (17134)
24. Dompierre-sur-Charente (17141)
25. Le Douhet (17143)
26. Écoyeux (17147)
27. Écurat (17148)
28. Épargnes (17152)
29. Les Essards (17154)
30. Floirac (17160)
31. Fontcouverte (17164)
32. Geay (17171)
33. Gémozac (17172)
34. Les Gonds (17179)
35. Grézac (17183)
36. La Jard (17191)
37. Jazennes (17196)
38. Luchat (17214)
39. Médis (17228)
40. Meursac (17232)
41. Migron (17235)
42. Montils (17242)
43. Montpellier-de-Médillan (17244)
44. Mortagne-sur-Gironde (17248)
45. Nancras (17255)
46. Nieul-lès-Saintes (17262)
47. Pessines (17275)
48. Pisany (17278)
49. Plassay (17280)
50. Pont-l'Abbé-d'Arnoult (17284)
51. Port-d'Envaux (17285)
52. Préguillac (17289)
53. Rétaud (17296)
54. Rioux (17298)
55. Romegoux (17302)
56. Rouffiac (17304)
57. Sablonceaux (17307)
58. Saint-André-de-Lidon (17310)
59. Saint-Bris-des-Bois (17313)
60. Saint-Césaire (17314)
61. Sainte-Gemme (17330)
62. Sainte-Radegonde (17389)
63. Saintes (17415)
64. Saint-Georges-des-Coteaux (17336)
65. Saint-Porchaire (17387)
66. Saint-Romain-de-Benet (17393)
67. Saint-Sauvant (17395)
68. Saint-Sever-de-Saintonge (17400)
69. Saint-Simon-de-Pellouaille (17404)
70. Saint-Sulpice-d'Arnoult (17408)
71. Saint-Vaize (17412)
72. Saujon (17421)
73. Semussac (17425)
74. Le Seure (17426)
75. Soulignonne (17431)
76. Talmont-sur-Gironde (17437)
77. Tanzac (17438)
78. Tesson (17441)
79. Thaims (17442)
80. Thénac (17444)
81. Thézac (17445)
82. Trizay (17453)
83. La Vallée (17455)
84. Varzay (17460)
85. Vénérand (17462)
86. Villars-en-Pons (17469)
87. Villars-les-Bois (17470)
88. Virollet (17479)

== History ==
The arrondissement of Saintes was created in 1800. At the January 2017 reorganisation of the arrondissements of Charente-Maritime, it lost 17 communes to the arrondissement of Jonzac and one commune to the arrondissement of Rochefort.

As a result of the reorganisation of the cantons of France which came into effect in 2015, the borders of the cantons are no longer related to the borders of the arrondissements. The cantons of the arrondissement of Saintes were, as of January 2015:

1. Burie
2. Cozes
3. Gémozac
4. Pons
5. Saintes-Est
6. Saintes-Nord
7. Saintes-Ouest
8. Saint-Porchaire
9. Saujon
