= Geay =

Geay may refer to the following places in France:

- Geay, Charente-Maritime, a commune in the Charente-Maritime department
- Geay, Deux-Sèvres, a commune in the Deux-Sèvres department

== See also ==
- Gabriel Geay, Tanzanian long-distance runner
