= Crazannes =

- Commune
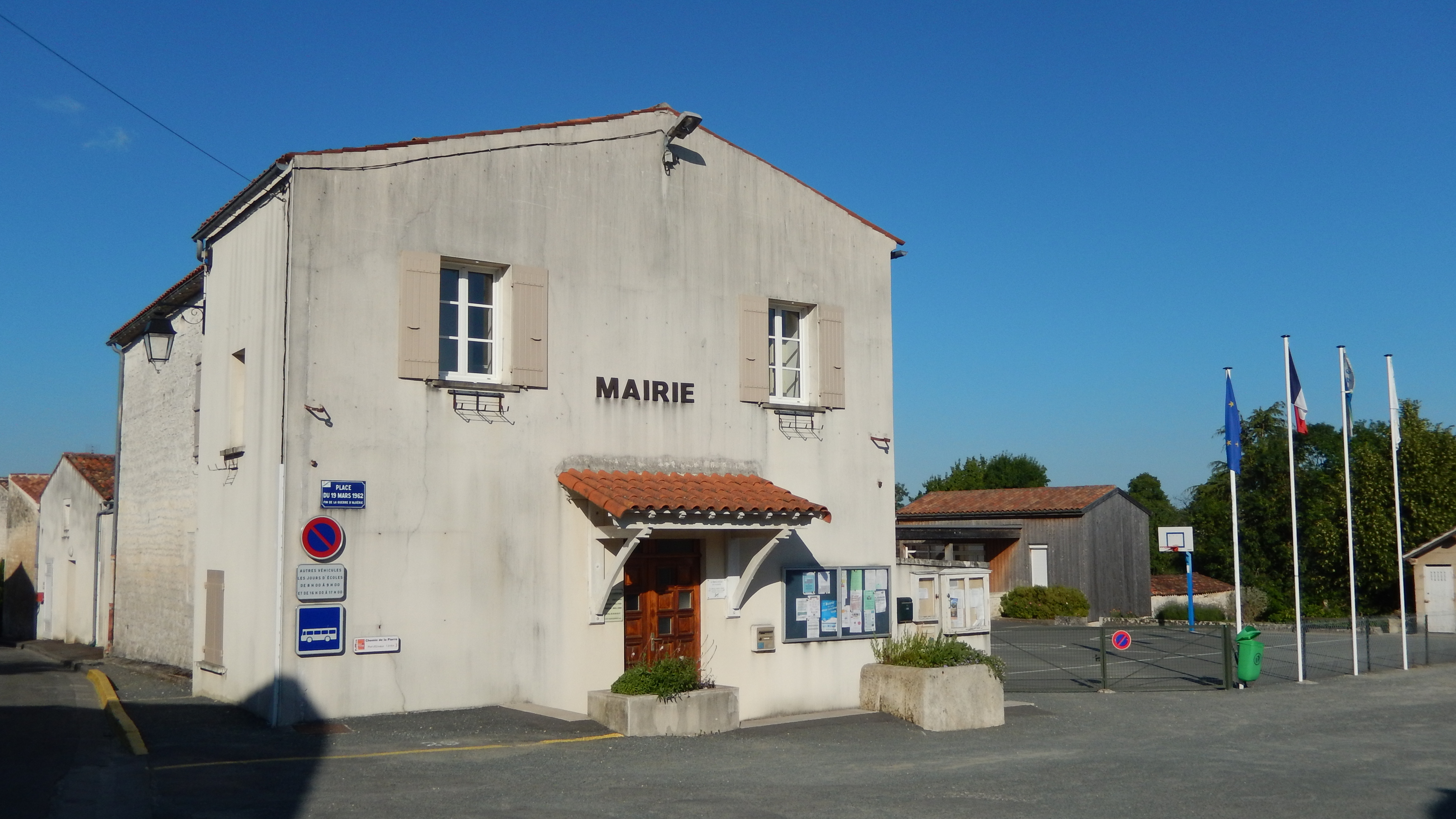
- The town hall in Crazannes

- Coat of arms
- Location of Crazannes
- Location within France Location within Nouvelle-Aquitaine
- Coordinates: 45°50′56″N 0°42′16″W
- Country: France
- Region: Nouvelle-Aquitaine
- Department: Charente-Maritime
- Arrondissement: Saintes
- Canton: Saint-Porchaire
- Intercommunality: Cœur de Saintonge

Government
  - Mayor (2020–2026): Marie-Noëlle Martin
- Area^{1}: 4.81 km^{2} (1.86 sq mi)
- Highest elevation: 28 m (92 ft)
- Lowest elevation: 2 m (6.6 ft)
- Population (2023): 442
  - Density: 91.9/km^{2} (238/sq mi)
- Time zone: UTC+01:00 (CET)
  - Summer (DST): UTC+02:00 (CEST)
- INSEE/Postal code: 17134 /17350
- ^{1} French Land Register data, which excludes lakes, ponds, glaciers > 1 km^{2} (0.386 sq mi or 247 acres) and river estuaries.

Crazannes (French pronunciation: [kʁazan]) is a commune in the Charente-Maritime department in southwestern France.

== Population ==
Historical population
| Year | Pop. | ±% p.a. |
|---|---|---|
| 1968 | 298 | — |
| 1975 | 328 | +1.38% |
| 1982 | 361 | +1.38% |
| 1990 | 357 | −0.14% |
| 1999 | 409 | +1.52% |
| 2007 | 441 | +0.95% |
| 2012 | 431 | −0.46% |
| 2017 | 440 | +0.41% |
| 2023 | 442 | +0.08% |
Source: INSEE

== See also ==
- Communes of the Charente-Maritime department
