= Les Essards, Charente-Maritime =

Les Essards
- Commune
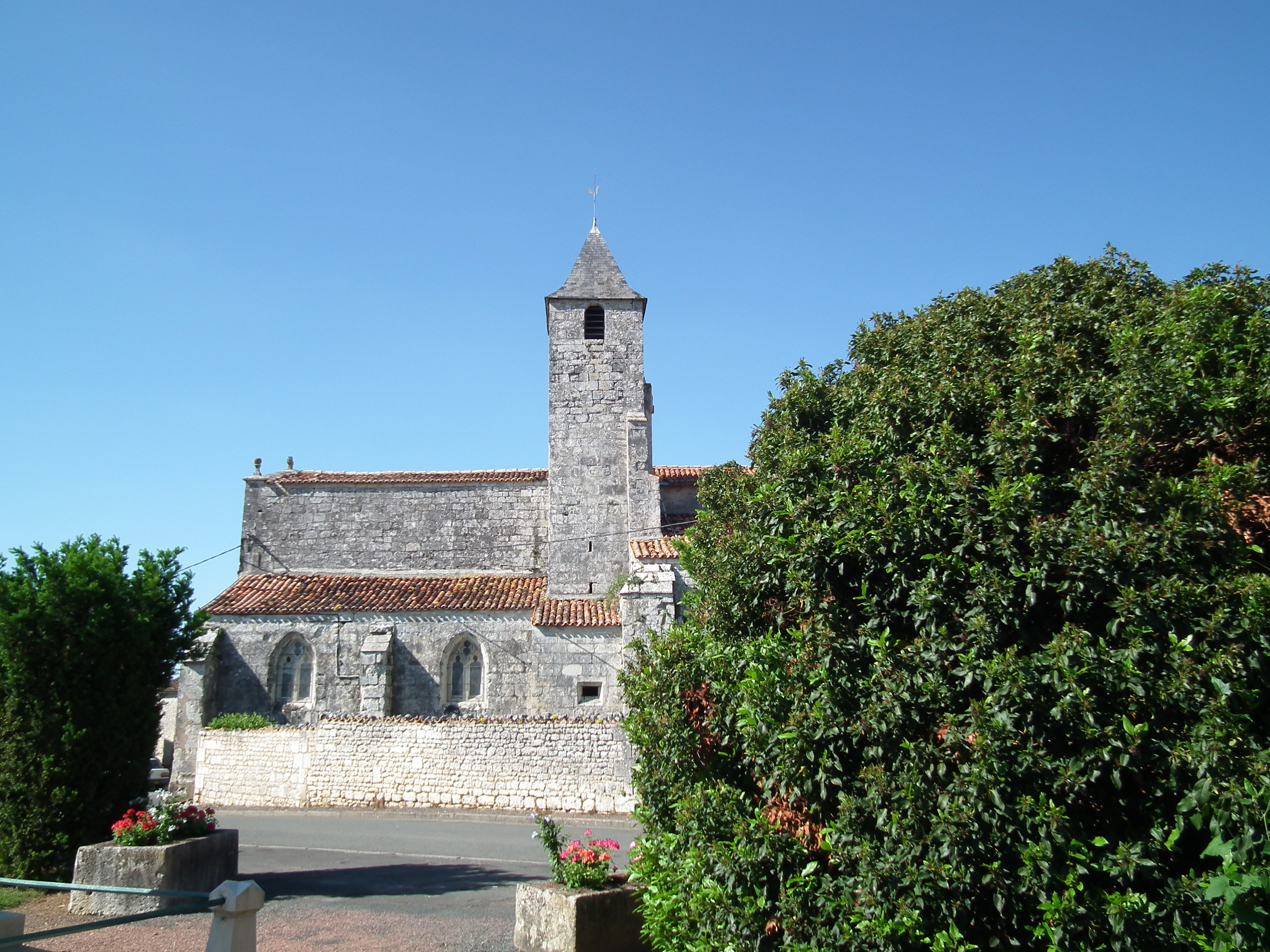
- The church in Les Essards
- Location of Les Essards
- Location within France Location within Nouvelle-Aquitaine
- Coordinates: 45°47′34″N 0°45′27″W
- Country: France
- Region: Nouvelle-Aquitaine
- Department: Charente-Maritime
- Arrondissement: Saintes
- Canton: Saint-Porchaire
- Intercommunality: Cœur de Saintonge

Government
  - Mayor (2020–2026): Patrick Vidal
- Area^{1}: 9.66 km^{2} (3.73 sq mi)
- Highest elevation: 62 m (203 ft)
- Lowest elevation: 23 m (75 ft)
- Population (2023): 740
  - Density: 77/km^{2} (200/sq mi)
- Time zone: UTC+01:00 (CET)
  - Summer (DST): UTC+02:00 (CEST)
- INSEE/Postal code: 17154 /17250
- ^{1} French Land Register data, which excludes lakes, ponds, glaciers > 1 km^{2} (0.386 sq mi or 247 acres) and river estuaries.

Les Essards (French pronunciation: [le.z‿ɛsaʁ]) is a commune in the Charente-Maritime department in southwestern France.

== Population ==
Historical population
Year	Pop.	±% p.a.
1968	430	—
1975	390	−1.39%
1982	412	+0.79%
1990	445	+0.97%
1999	484	+0.94%
2007	565	+1.95%
2012	681	+3.81%
2017	698	+0.49%
2023	740	+0.98%
Source: INSEE

== See also ==
- Communes of the Charente-Maritime department
