= Saint-Porchaire =

- Commune
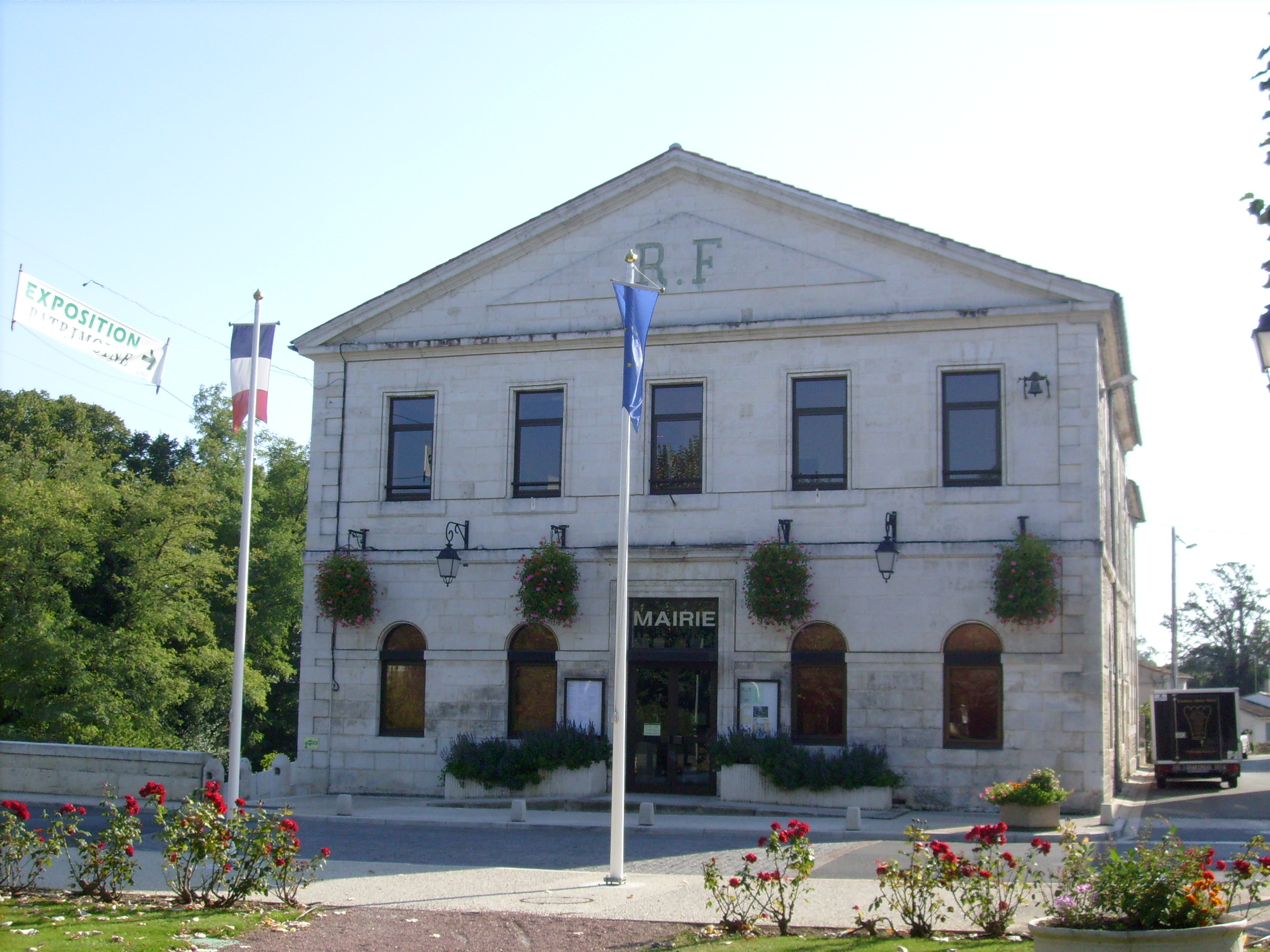
- The town hall in Saint-Porchaire

- Coat of arms
- Location of Saint-Porchaire
- Location within France Location within Nouvelle-Aquitaine
- Coordinates: 45°49′18″N 0°47′07″W
- Country: France
- Region: Nouvelle-Aquitaine
- Department: Charente-Maritime
- Arrondissement: Saintes
- Canton: Saint-Porchaire

Government
  - Mayor (2020–2026): Jean-Claude Grenon
- Area^{1}: 17.40 km^{2} (6.72 sq mi)
- Elevation: 23 m (75 ft)
- Highest elevation: 54 m (177 ft)
- Lowest elevation: 7 m (23 ft)
- Population (2023): 2,040
  - Density: 117/km^{2} (304/sq mi)
- Time zone: UTC+01:00 (CET)
  - Summer (DST): UTC+02:00 (CEST)
- INSEE/Postal code: 17387 /17250
- ^{1} French Land Register data, which excludes lakes, ponds, glaciers > 1 km^{2} (0.386 sq mi or 247 acres) and river estuaries.

Saint-Porchaire (French pronunciation: [sɛ̃ pɔʁʃɛʁ]) is a commune in the Charente-Maritime department in the administrative region of Nouvelle-Aquitaine, France.

== Population ==
Historical population
| Year | Pop. | ±% p.a. |
|---|---|---|
| 1968 | 1,087 | — |
| 1975 | 1,120 | +0.43% |
| 1982 | 1,221 | +1.24% |
| 1990 | 1,289 | +0.68% |
| 1999 | 1,335 | +0.39% |
| 2007 | 1,573 | +2.07% |
| 2012 | 1,725 | +1.86% |
| 2017 | 1,862 | +1.54% |
| 2023 | 2,040 | +1.53% |
Source: INSEE

== See also ==
- Communes of the Charente-Maritime department
