= Soulignonne =

- Commune
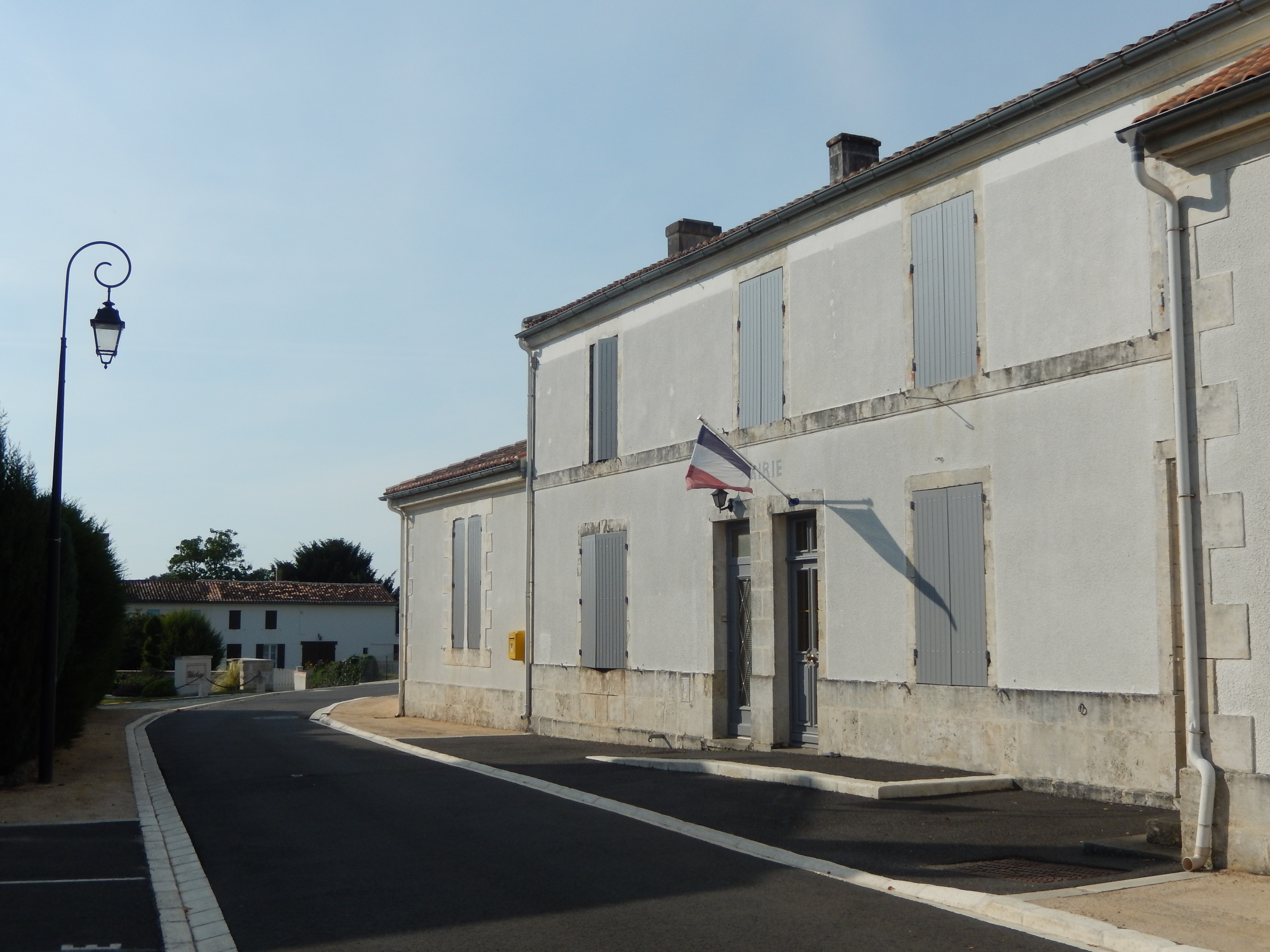
- The town hall in Soulignonne
- Location of Soulignonne
- Location within France Location within Nouvelle-Aquitaine
- Coordinates: 45°46′41″N 0°47′15″W
- Country: France
- Region: Nouvelle-Aquitaine
- Department: Charente-Maritime
- Arrondissement: Saintes
- Canton: Saint-Porchaire

Government
  - Mayor (2020–2026): Patrick Machefert
- Area^{1}: 14.31 km^{2} (5.53 sq mi)
- Highest elevation: 60 m (200 ft)
- Lowest elevation: 15 m (49 ft)
- Population (2023): 752
  - Density: 52.6/km^{2} (136/sq mi)
- Time zone: UTC+01:00 (CET)
  - Summer (DST): UTC+02:00 (CEST)
- INSEE/Postal code: 17431 /17250
- ^{1} French Land Register data, which excludes lakes, ponds, glaciers > 1 km^{2} (0.386 sq mi or 247 acres) and river estuaries.

Soulignonne (French pronunciation: [suliɲɔn]) is a commune in the Charente-Maritime department in southwestern France.

== Population ==
Historical population
Year	Pop.	±% p.a.
1968	509	—
1975	483	−0.75%
1982	457	−0.79%
1990	494	+0.98%
1999	544	+1.08%
2007	688	+2.98%
2012	726	+1.08%
2017	701	−0.70%
2023	752	+1.18%
Source: INSEE

== See also ==
- Communes of the Charente-Maritime department
