= Nieul-lès-Saintes =

- Commune
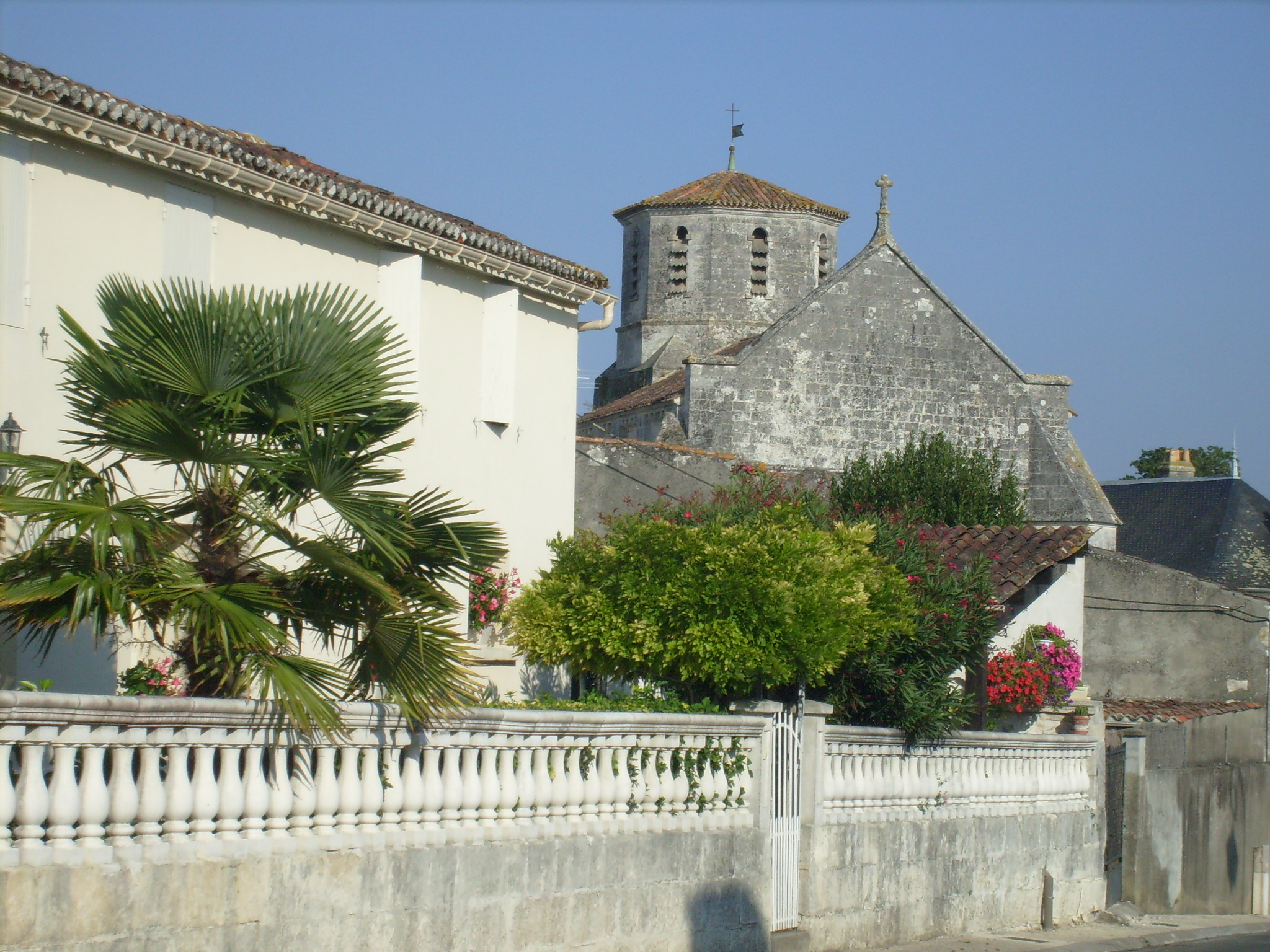
- The church and surroundings in Nieul-lès-Saintes
- Location of Nieul-lès-Saintes
- Location within France Location within Nouvelle-Aquitaine
- Coordinates: 45°45′38″N 0°43′52″W
- Country: France
- Region: Nouvelle-Aquitaine
- Department: Charente-Maritime
- Arrondissement: Saintes
- Canton: Saint-Porchaire

Government
  - Mayor (2020–2026): Mikaël Moinet
- Area^{1}: 20.41 km^{2} (7.88 sq mi)
- Elevation: 45 m (148 ft)
- Highest elevation: 68 m (223 ft)
- Lowest elevation: 19 m (62 ft)
- Population (2023): 1,186
  - Density: 58.11/km^{2} (150.5/sq mi)
- Time zone: UTC+01:00 (CET)
  - Summer (DST): UTC+02:00 (CEST)
- INSEE/Postal code: 17262 /17810
- ^{1} French Land Register data, which excludes lakes, ponds, glaciers > 1 km^{2} (0.386 sq mi or 247 acres) and river estuaries.

Nieul-lès-Saintes (French pronunciation: [njœl lɛ sɛ̃t], literally Nieul near Saintes) is a commune in the Charente-Maritime department in southwestern France.

== Population ==
Historical population
Year	Pop.	±% p.a.
1968	636	—
1975	569	−1.58%
1982	763	+4.28%
1990	953	+2.82%
1999	975	+0.25%
2007	979	+0.05%
2012	1,116	+2.65%
2017	1,252	+2.33%
2023	1,186	−0.90%
Source: INSEE

== See also ==
- Communes of the Charente-Maritime department
