= Rioux =

Commune in Charente-Maritime, France

- Commune
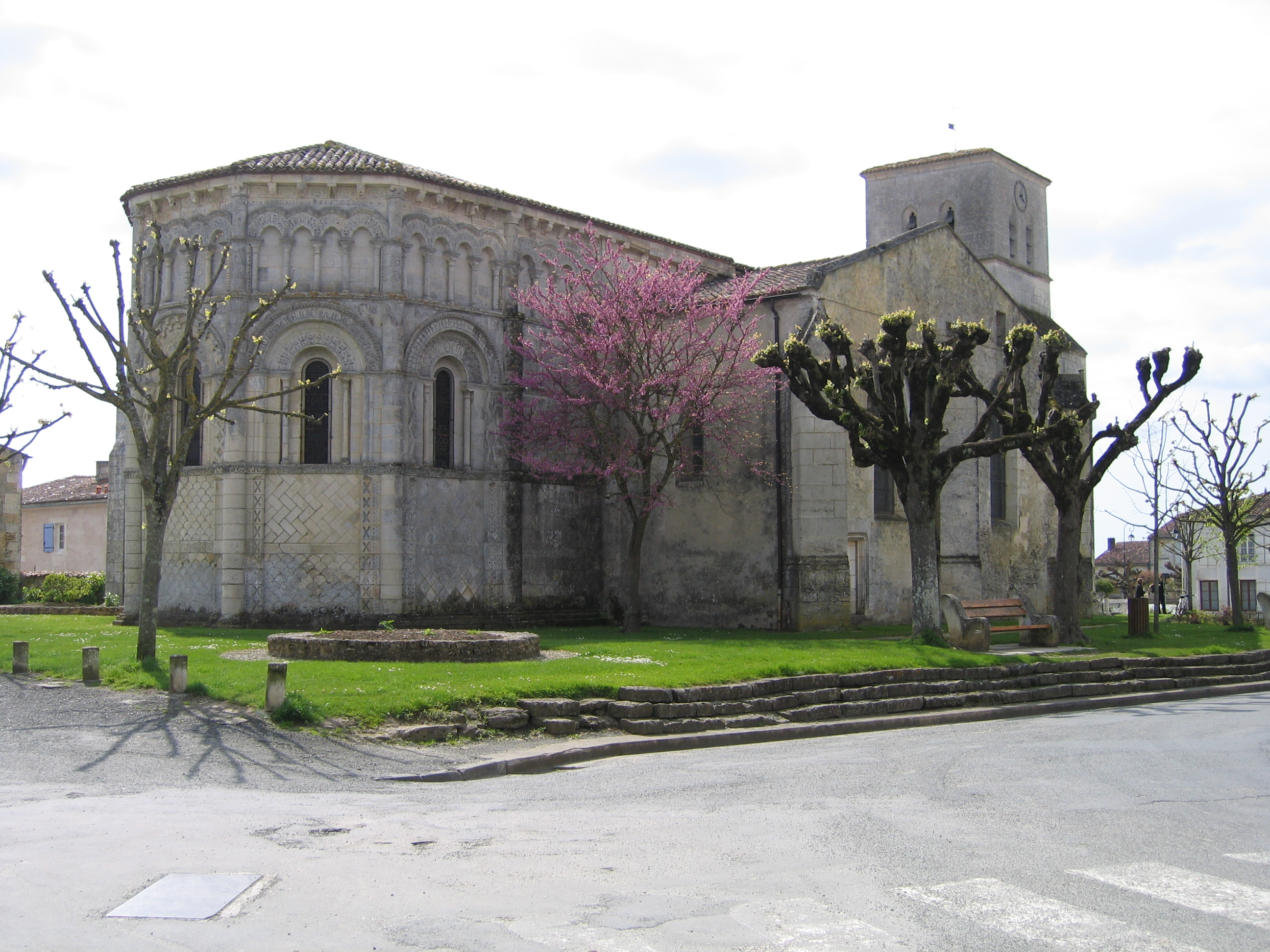
- Romanesque church

- Coat of arms
- Location of Rioux
- Location within France Location within Nouvelle-Aquitaine
- Coordinates: 45°38′09″N 0°42′37″W
- Country: France
- Region: Nouvelle-Aquitaine
- Department: Charente-Maritime
- Arrondissement: Saintes
- Canton: Thénac
- Intercommunality: Gémozac et Saintonge Viticole

Government
  - Mayor (2020–2026): Philippe Soulisse
- Area^{1}: 18.98 km^{2} (7.33 sq mi)
- Highest elevation: 56 m (184 ft)
- Lowest elevation: 24 m (79 ft)
- Population (2023): 964
  - Density: 50.8/km^{2} (132/sq mi)
- Time zone: UTC+01:00 (CET)
  - Summer (DST): UTC+02:00 (CEST)
- INSEE/Postal code: 17298 /17460
- ^{1} French Land Register data, which excludes lakes, ponds, glaciers > 1 km^{2} (0.386 sq mi or 247 acres) and river estuaries.

Rioux (French pronunciation: [ʁiju]) is a commune in the Charente-Maritime department in southwestern France. It is best known for its Romanesque church, particularly its fine corbel table.

== Population ==
Historical population
| Year | Pop. | ±% p.a. |
|---|---|---|
| 1968 | 615 | — |
| 1975 | 685 | +1.55% |
| 1982 | 645 | −0.86% |
| 1990 | 715 | +1.30% |
| 1999 | 771 | +0.84% |
| 2007 | 891 | +1.82% |
| 2012 | 933 | +0.93% |
| 2017 | 960 | +0.57% |
| 2023 | 964 | +0.07% |
Source: INSEE

== See also ==
- Communes of the Charente-Maritime department
- Rio (disambiguation)
- Ríos (disambiguation)
