= Sainte-Radegonde, Charente-Maritime =

Sainte-Radegonde
- Commune
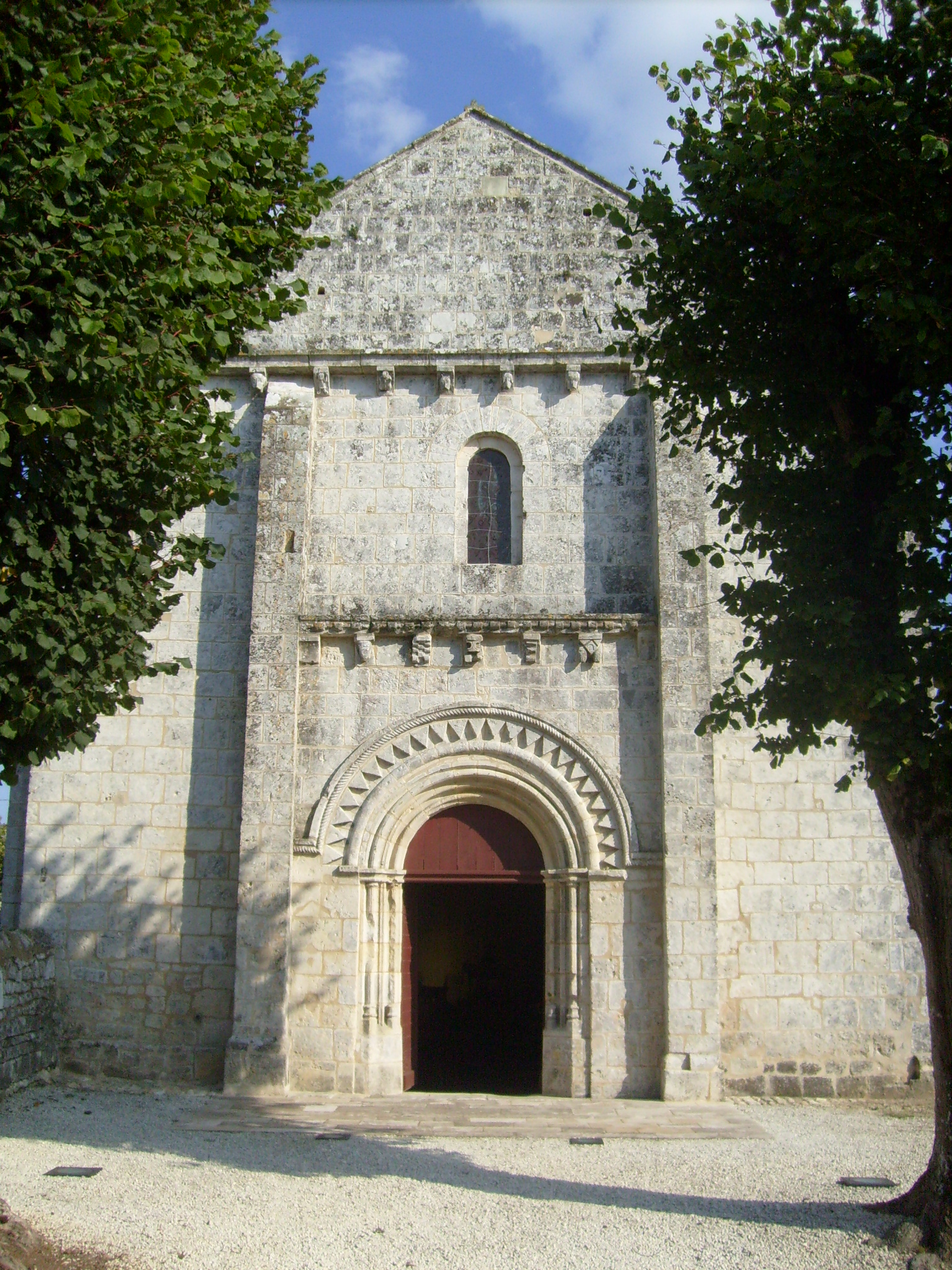
- The church in Sainte-Radegonde
- Location of Sainte-Radegonde
- Location within France Location within Nouvelle-Aquitaine
- Coordinates: 45°50′51″N 0°52′24″W
- Country: France
- Region: Nouvelle-Aquitaine
- Department: Charente-Maritime
- Arrondissement: Saintes
- Canton: Saint-Porchaire

Government
  - Mayor (2020–2026): Monique Rivière
- Area^{1}: 11.14 km^{2} (4.30 sq mi)
- Elevation: 50 m (160 ft)
- Highest elevation: 35 m (115 ft)
- Lowest elevation: 2 m (6.6 ft)
- Population (2023): 589
  - Density: 52.9/km^{2} (137/sq mi)
- Time zone: UTC+01:00 (CET)
  - Summer (DST): UTC+02:00 (CEST)
- INSEE/Postal code: 17389 /17250
- ^{1} French Land Register data, which excludes lakes, ponds, glaciers > 1 km^{2} (0.386 sq mi or 247 acres) and river estuaries.

Sainte-Radegonde (French pronunciation: [sɛ̃t ʁadɡɔ̃d]) is a commune in the Charente-Maritime department in southwestern France.

== Population ==
Historical population
Year	Pop.	±% p.a.
1968	248	—
1975	270	+1.22%
1982	302	+1.61%
1990	369	+2.54%
1999	382	+0.39%
2007	433	+1.58%
2012	556	+5.13%
2017	580	+0.85%
2023	589	+0.26%
Source: INSEE

== See also ==
- Communes of the Charente-Maritime department
