= Trizay =

- Commune
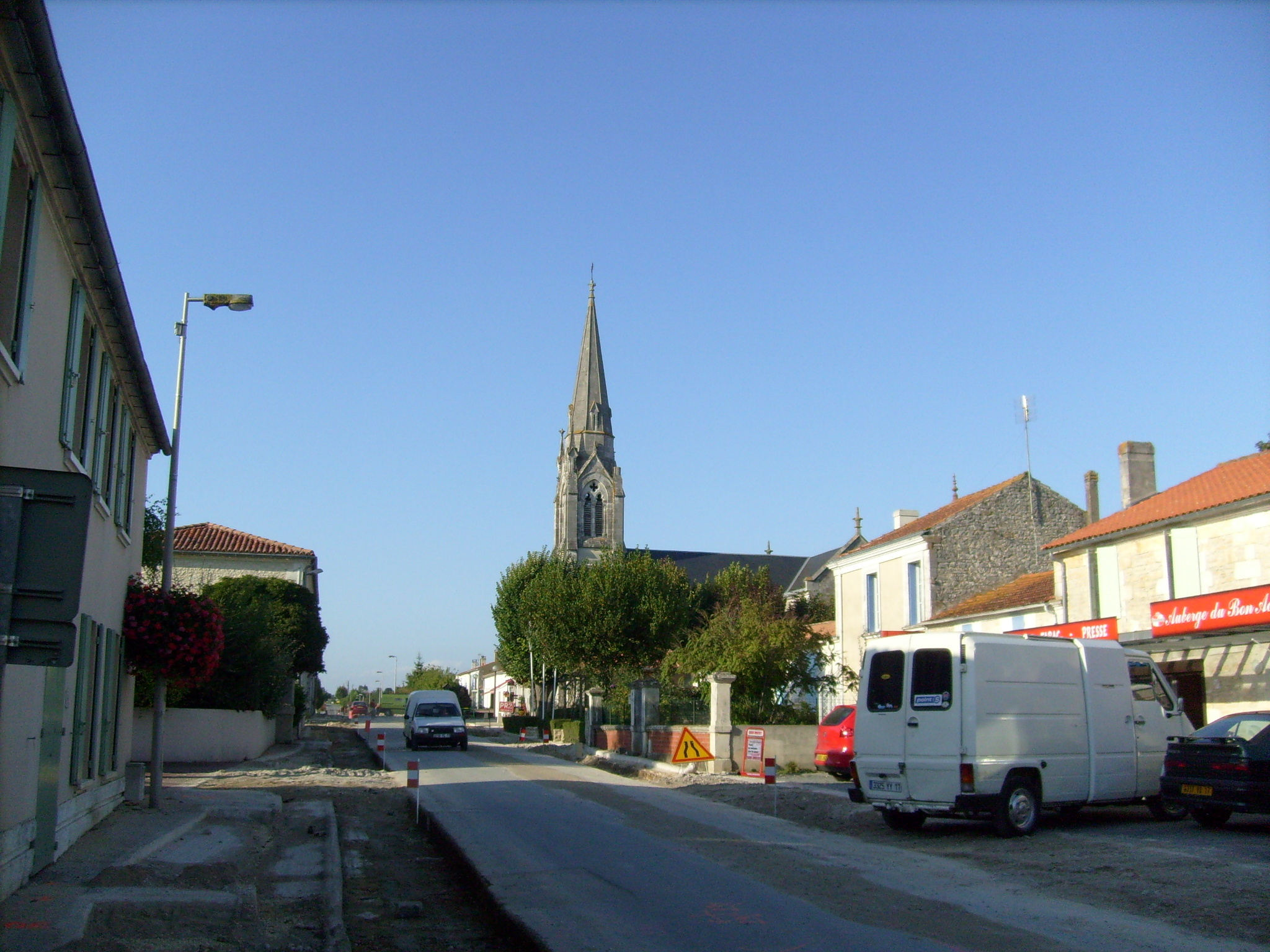
- The church and surroundings in Trizay
- Location of Trizay
- Location within France Location within Nouvelle-Aquitaine
- Coordinates: 45°53′00″N 0°53′44″W
- Country: France
- Region: Nouvelle-Aquitaine
- Department: Charente-Maritime
- Arrondissement: Saintes
- Canton: Saint-Porchaire

Government
  - Mayor (2022–2026): Stanislas Caillaud
- Area^{1}: 14.13 km^{2} (5.46 sq mi)
- Highest elevation: 25 m (82 ft)
- Lowest elevation: 0 m (0 ft)
- Population (2023): 1,538
  - Density: 108.8/km^{2} (281.9/sq mi)
- Time zone: UTC+01:00 (CET)
  - Summer (DST): UTC+02:00 (CEST)
- INSEE/Postal code: 17453 /17250
- ^{1} French Land Register data, which excludes lakes, ponds, glaciers > 1 km^{2} (0.386 sq mi or 247 acres) and river estuaries.

Trizay (French pronunciation: [tʁizɛ]) is a commune in the Charente-Maritime department in southwestern France. Its inhabitants are known as *Trizayens* and *Trizayennes*.

This small commune in the Arnoult Valley—whose economy long depended almost exclusively on market gardening and stone quarrying—is now oriented towards tourism. In addition to the remains of a Benedictine priory designated as one of the "Treasures of Saintonge" (*Trésors de Saintonge*), the commune is home to the *Jardins de Compostelle* botanical park, located near the *Lac de Bois-Fleuri*, an artificial lake created in 1995.

== Geography ==
The commune of Trizay is located in the west-central part of the Charente-Maritime department, within the former historical province of Saintonge. Part of the Atlantic South of France (*Midi atlantique*), it can be associated with two major geographical regions: the *Grand Ouest* (Greater West) and the *Grand Sud-Ouest* (Greater Southwest) of France.

Trizay is a commune situated 12 kilometers from the center of Rochefort, the seat of the *arrondissement* and the second-largest urban area in the Charente-Maritime department.

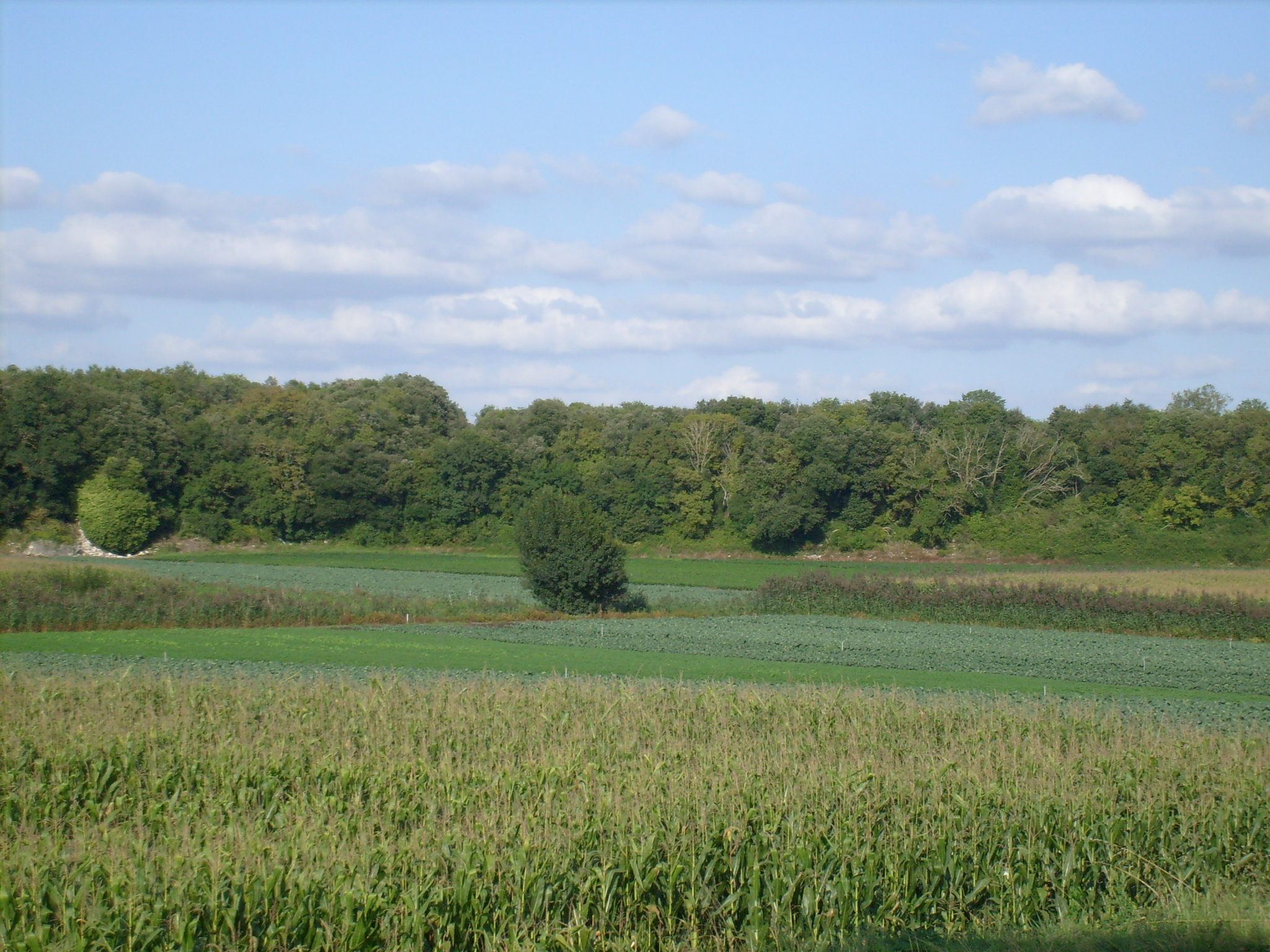
Landscape of the Arnoult valley.

== History ==
=== Prehistory ===
The communal territory seems to have been occupied for a long time, probably since the Neolithic. A dolmen, the Buffetizon dolmen, bears witness to this ancient era. Partially destroyed, it was rebuilt during the last century. Bronze axes were also found by a farmer in 1903. These, found in an excavation near the place called l'Avenir, were 21 in number, including 14 with straight edges and 7 of rectangular shape.
In prehistoric times, part of the town was on the edge of a vast estuary, the estuary of the Arnoult. This extended to Pont-l'Abbé-d'Arnoult and Sainte-Radegonde.
Widely open to the sea, its footprint is visible through cliffss, today isolated in the middle of the land: the cadorettes.

=== Antiquity ===
From the Gallo-Roman period only few remains remain, these consisting mainly of a few foundations found in particular near the place called Chizé.

=== Middle Ages ===
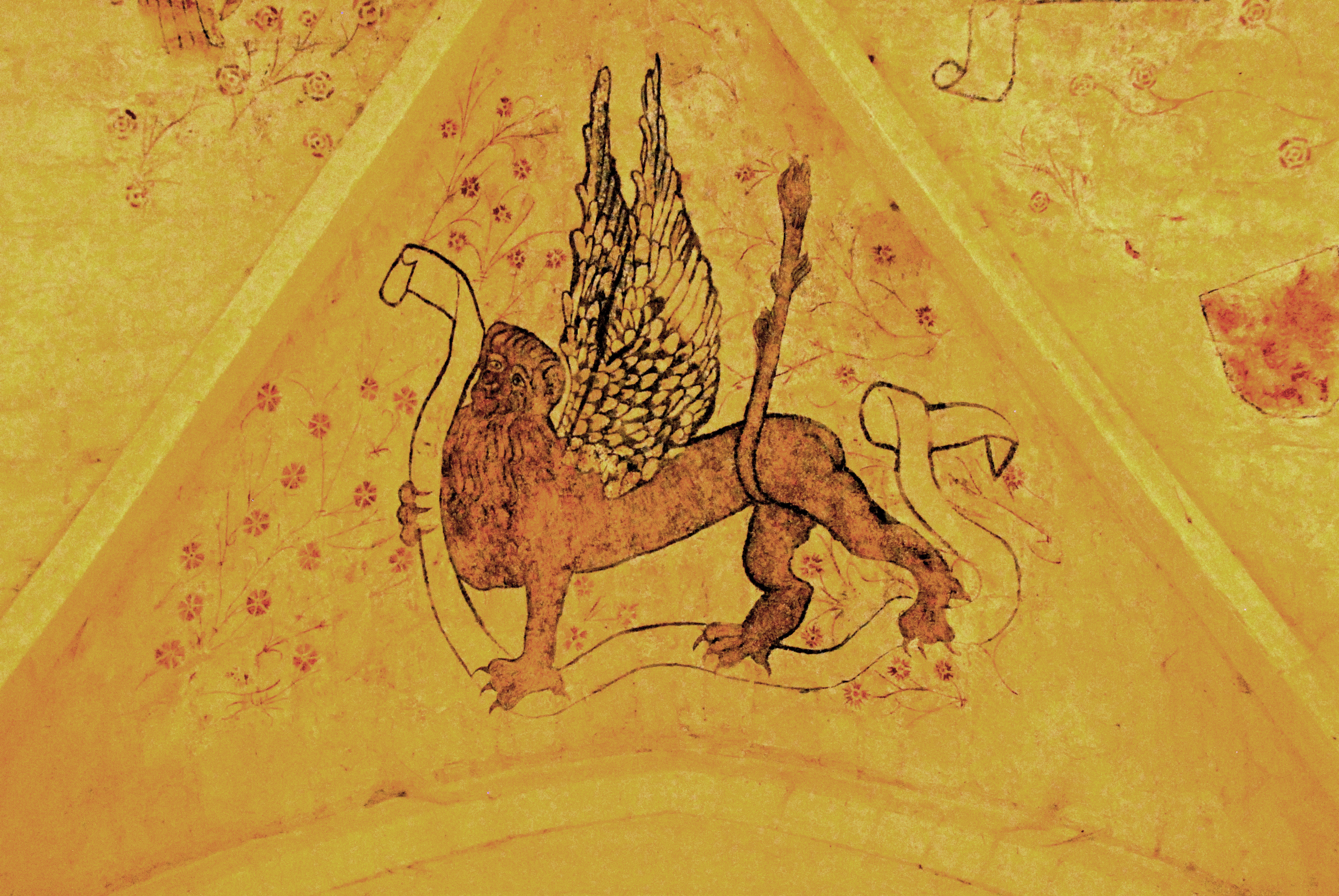
Frescoes from the 15th century in the refectory of the priory.

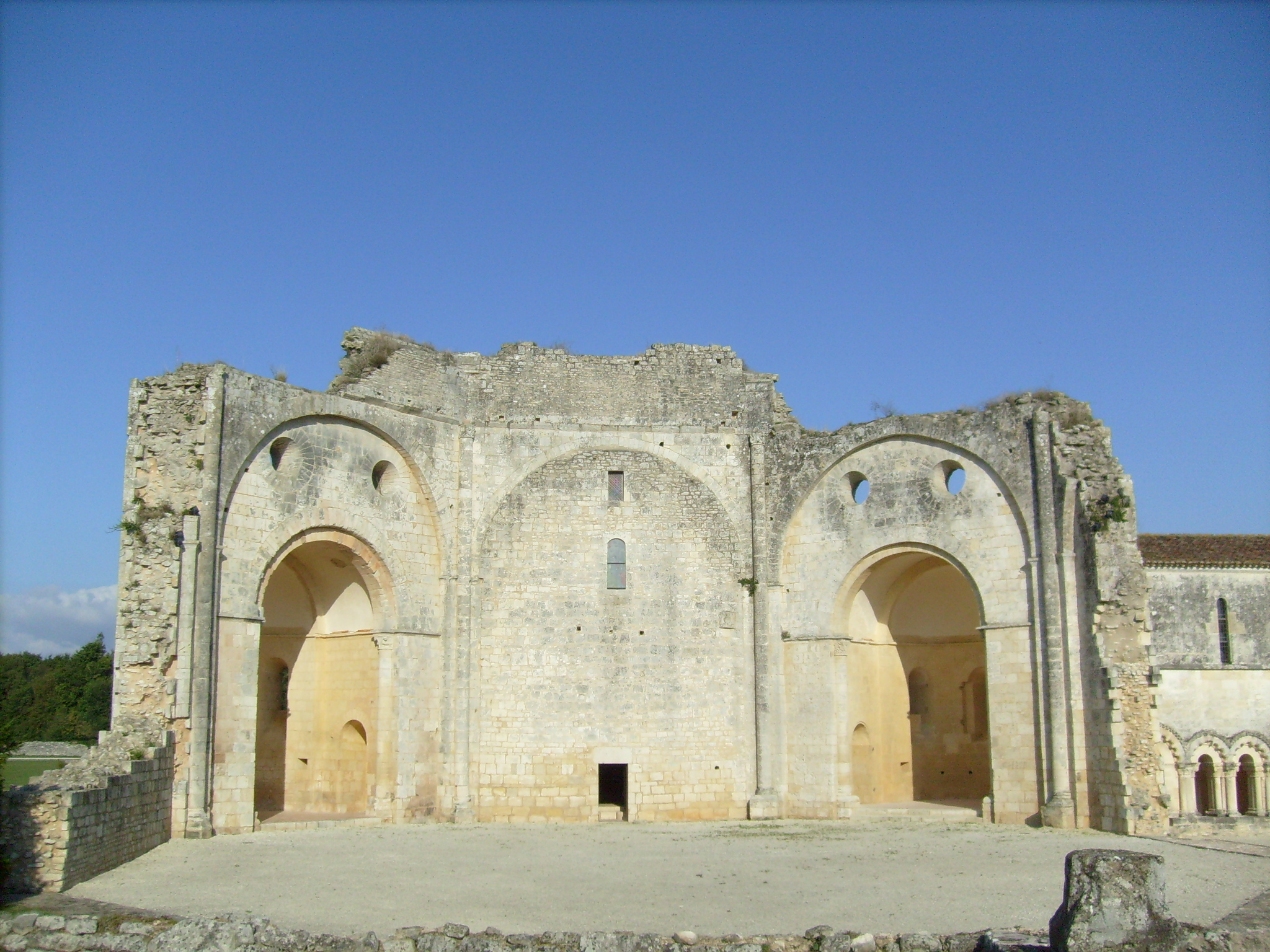
Ruins of the abbey church.

In the Middle Ages, the village belonged to the lordship of Tonnay. One of these lords, whose name has not passed down to posterity, founded the Priory of Trizay in the 11th century before donating it to the Abbaye de la Chaise-Dieu.

A legend states that the founding of this monastery occurred following revenge by this lord, who allegedly murdered several monks suspected of having raped his daughter. He would have had the monks tied up in a bag, before they were thrown into a well. In fact, a locality still bore the name of Fosse-aux-Moines in the 19thth century.
Seeking to atone for his fault, this lord then founded the priory.

The lords of Tonnay showed great generosity towards this priory, whose history however remains very little known.

=== Modern times ===
In 1585, after the retirement of the Protestant leader Henri I de Bourbon-Condé in England, the League wanted to complete the reduction of the “Huguenots”, who still held several strongholds in the region. Among these, the priory of Trizay, transformed into a citadel and which, passed successively to the two parties, was degraded. During the fighting, the prioral church was devastated and largely ruined, while the archives of the priory were also destroyed.

In 1698, the tax registers of the Généralité (France) of La Rochelle reveal that the parish of Trisay subscribed for 410 livre to the two main lords of the place: the bishop of Lectoure, François-Louis de Polastron, commendatory abbot of the abbey, and the lord of Coutiers. The same document reveals that the parish mainly produces: wheat, wood and pastures (sic) and little wine.

1783 was a year marked by unusual weather conditions across Europe. In Saintonge and in Aunis, there were violent frosts until spring, which wiped out the harvests, which were already very meager the previous year. In a report summarizing the situation in all the parishes of the Généralité (France), we note that in Trizay, there were 12 births for 17 deaths and that “There are many poor people in this parish”.

=== French Revolution and Empire ===
During the dark days of the Revolutionary period—specifically in 1793—the "Cult of Reason" held sway. The authorities, having instituted the Reign of Terror, actively promoted de-Christianization. Citizens Lequinio and Laignelot were the "representatives of the people" tasked with enforcing the Terror in Rochefort and its district. Persecution of the clergy began swiftly, marking the start of the "Rochefort Hulks" episode, during which refractory priests were crammed onto prison ships.

Amidst this turmoil, some priests chose to renounce their vows. The priest of Trizay, Father Chabert, was one such individual. Casting his certificate of ordination into the fire during a grand patriotic ceremony, he declared that, "recognizing the error of the deceitful faith he had preached until then, and wishing to enter the path of philosophy and sound doctrine, he formally renounced the calling of a priest..." Records from the Rochefort municipality, spanning the period from 16 Brumaire to 1 Floréal of Year II, document these events.

=== Modern Era ===
==== A New Village Center ====
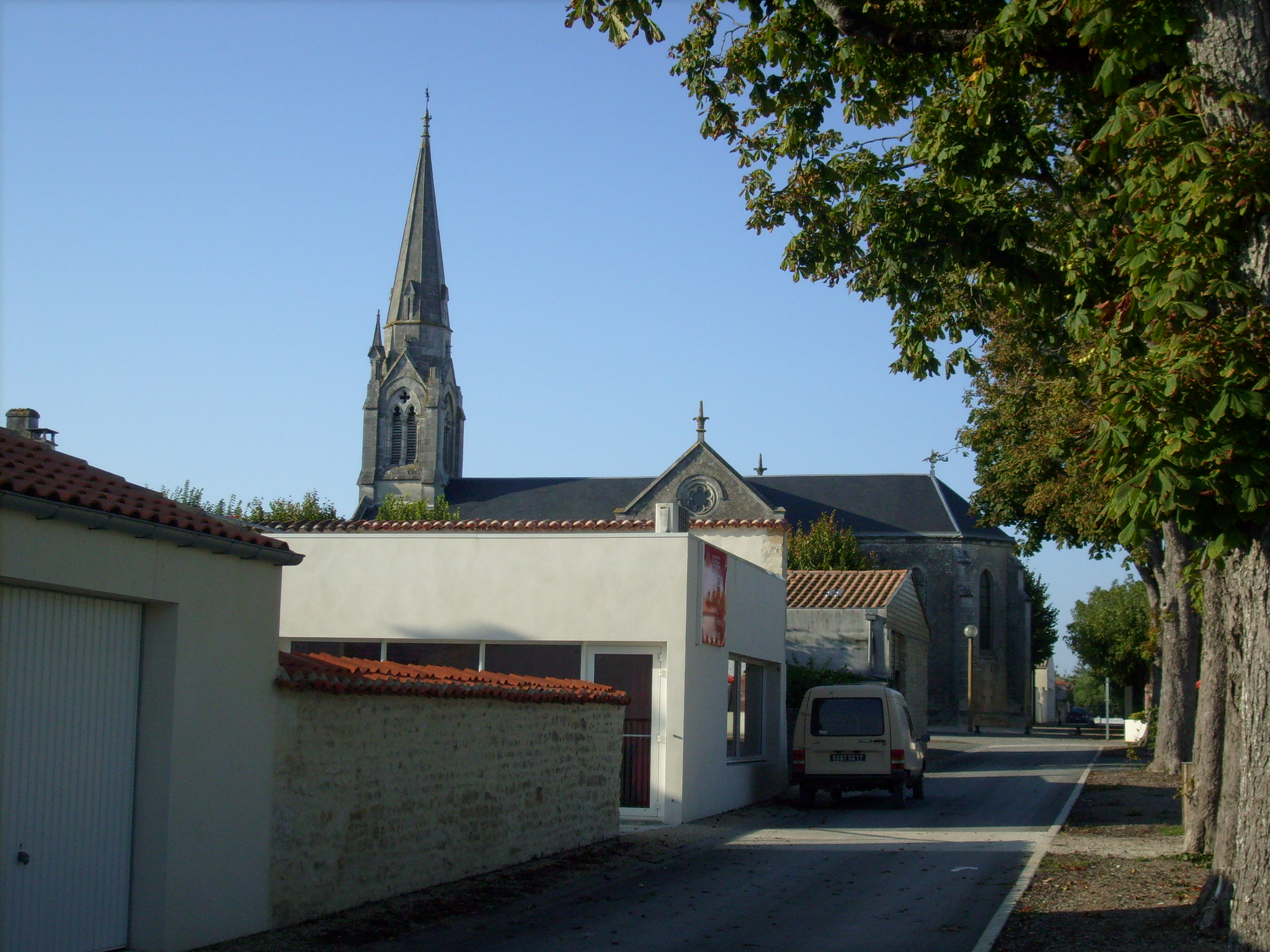
The village center and Saint-François Church.

Originally characterized by scattered settlement, the municipality chose to build a new, more central village center; this was established in 1840 on communal land—a legacy of a donation made to the priory by the Lord Hugues de Tonnay in 1330. A chapel was built, then replaced in 1895 by a new church to take the place of the priory's church, which was falling into ruin. The cemetery, formerly adjacent to the priory, was also relocated.

The restoration of the priory took place in 1994, followed a year later by the creation of a park on the site of former stone quarries: the *Lac du Bois-Fleuri*, later complemented by the *Jardins de Compostelle*.

== Population ==
Historical population
Year	Pop.	±% p.a.
1968	707	—
1975	733	+0.52%
1982	902	+3.01%
1990	1,049	+1.91%
1999	1,122	+0.75%
2007	1,270	+1.56%
2012	1,394	+1.88%
2017	1,476	+1.15%
2023	1,538	+0.69%
Source: INSEE

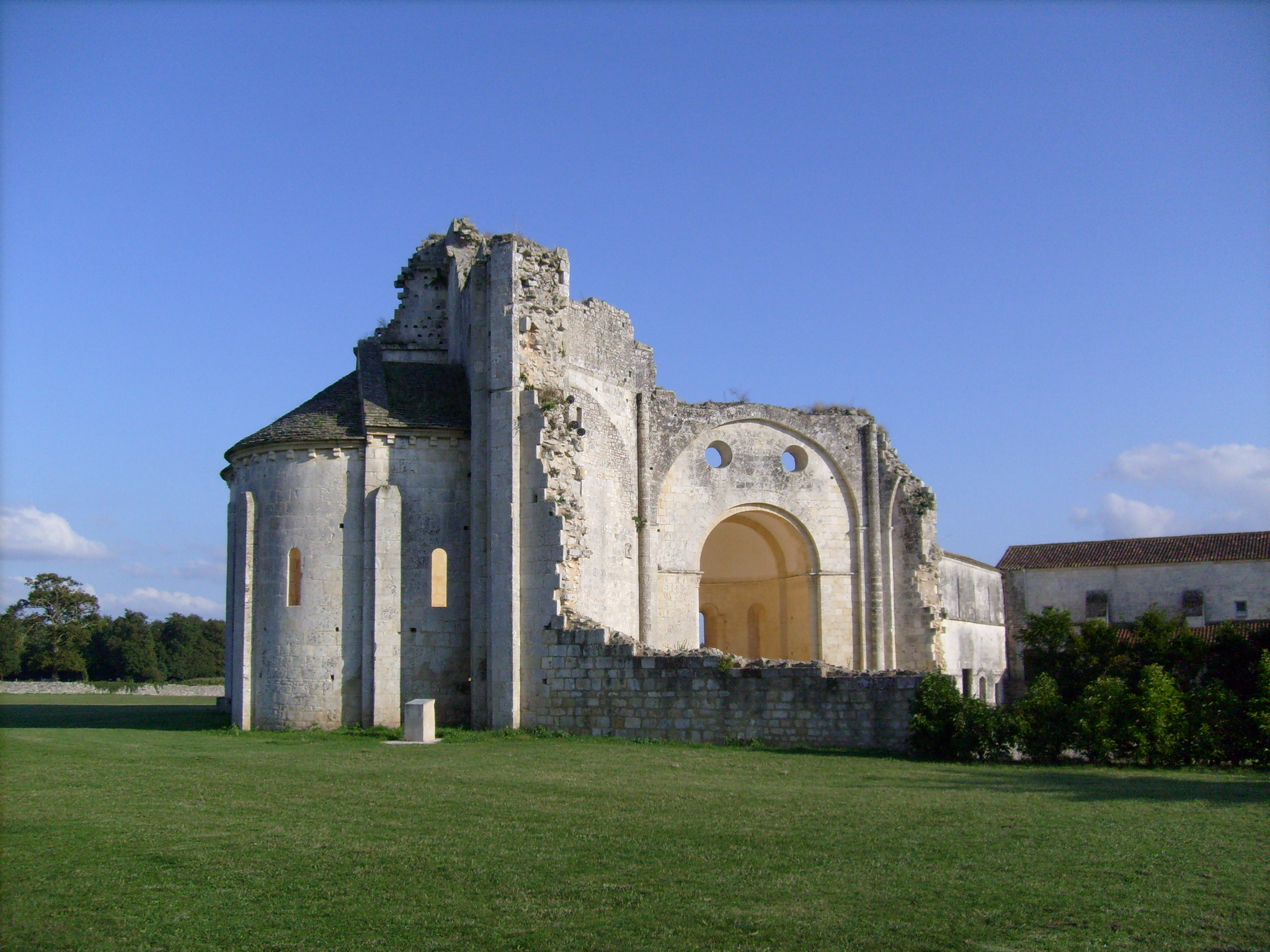
Abbey of Trizay

== See also ==
- Communes of the Charente-Maritime department
