= La Vallée, Charente-Maritime =

La Vallée
- Commune
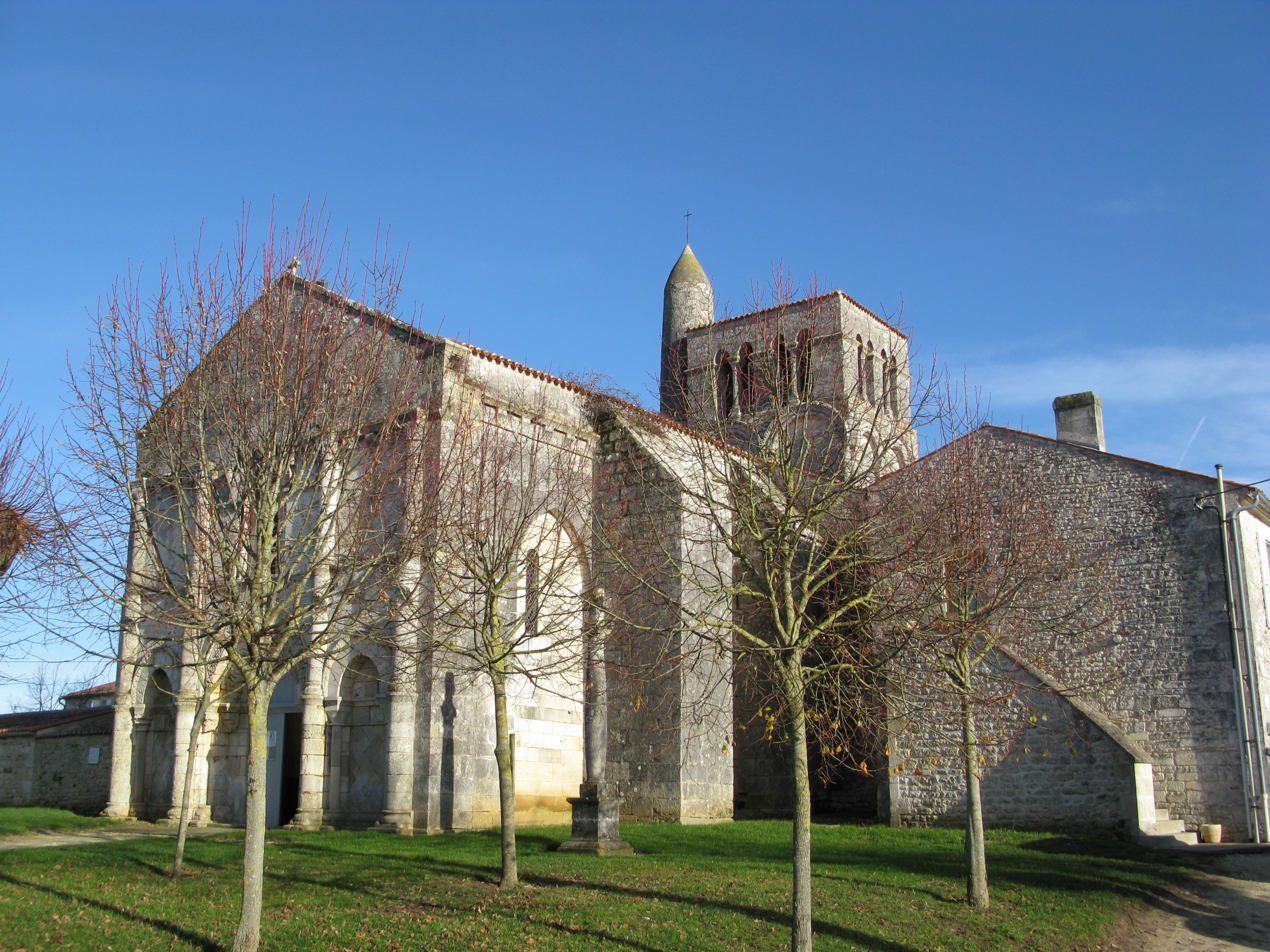
- The church in La Vallée
- Location of La Vallée
- Location within France Location within Nouvelle-Aquitaine
- Coordinates: 45°53′32″N 0°50′26″W
- Country: France
- Region: Nouvelle-Aquitaine
- Department: Charente-Maritime
- Arrondissement: Saintes
- Canton: Saint-Porchaire

Government
  - Mayor (2020–2026): Jean-Paul Gaillot
- Area^{1}: 16.37 km^{2} (6.32 sq mi)
- Highest elevation: 34 m (112 ft)
- Lowest elevation: 0 m (0 ft)
- Population (2023): 707
  - Density: 43.2/km^{2} (112/sq mi)
- Time zone: UTC+01:00 (CET)
  - Summer (DST): UTC+02:00 (CEST)
- INSEE/Postal code: 17455 /17250
- ^{1} French Land Register data, which excludes lakes, ponds, glaciers > 1 km^{2} (0.386 sq mi or 247 acres) and river estuaries.

La Vallée (French pronunciation: [la vale]) is a commune in the Charente-Maritime department in southwestern France.

== Population ==
Historical population
Year	Pop.	±% p.a.
1968	570	—
1975	524	−1.19%
1982	511	−0.36%
1990	585	+1.70%
1999	644	+1.07%
2007	674	+0.57%
2012	684	+0.29%
2017	677	−0.21%
2023	707	+0.73%
Source: INSEE

== See also ==
- Communes of the Charente-Maritime department
