= Romegoux =

- Commune
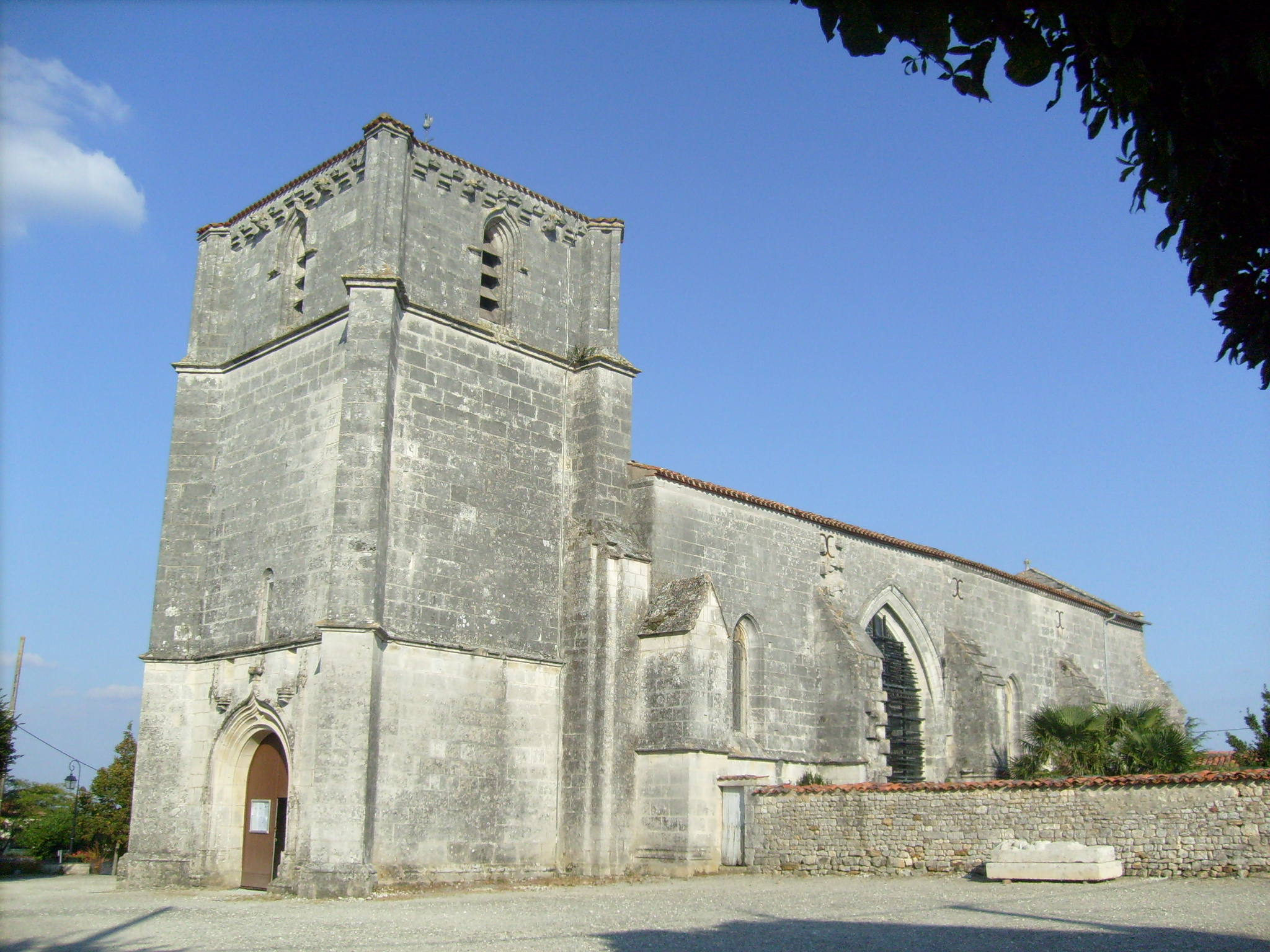
- The church in Romegoux

- Coat of arms
- Location of Romegoux
- Location within France Location within Nouvelle-Aquitaine
- Coordinates: 45°52′21″N 0°48′19″W
- Country: France
- Region: Nouvelle-Aquitaine
- Department: Charente-Maritime
- Arrondissement: Saintes
- Canton: Saint-Porchaire

Government
  - Mayor (2022–2026): Jean-Pascal Viale
- Area^{1}: 13.25 km^{2} (5.12 sq mi)
- Highest elevation: 28 m (92 ft)
- Lowest elevation: 0 m (0 ft)
- Population (2023): 640
  - Density: 48/km^{2} (130/sq mi)
- Time zone: UTC+01:00 (CET)
  - Summer (DST): UTC+02:00 (CEST)
- INSEE/Postal code: 17302 /17250
- ^{1} French Land Register data, which excludes lakes, ponds, glaciers > 1 km^{2} (0.386 sq mi or 247 acres) and river estuaries.

Romegoux (French pronunciation: [ʁɔmɡu]) is a commune in the Charente-Maritime department in southwestern France.

== Population ==
Historical population
Year	Pop.	±% p.a.
1968	496	—
1975	464	−0.95%
1982	440	−0.76%
1990	493	+1.43%
1999	515	+0.49%
2007	612	+2.18%
2012	613	+0.03%
2017	603	−0.33%
2023	640	+1.00%
Source: INSEE

== See also ==
- Communes of the Charente-Maritime department
