= Balanzac =

- Commune
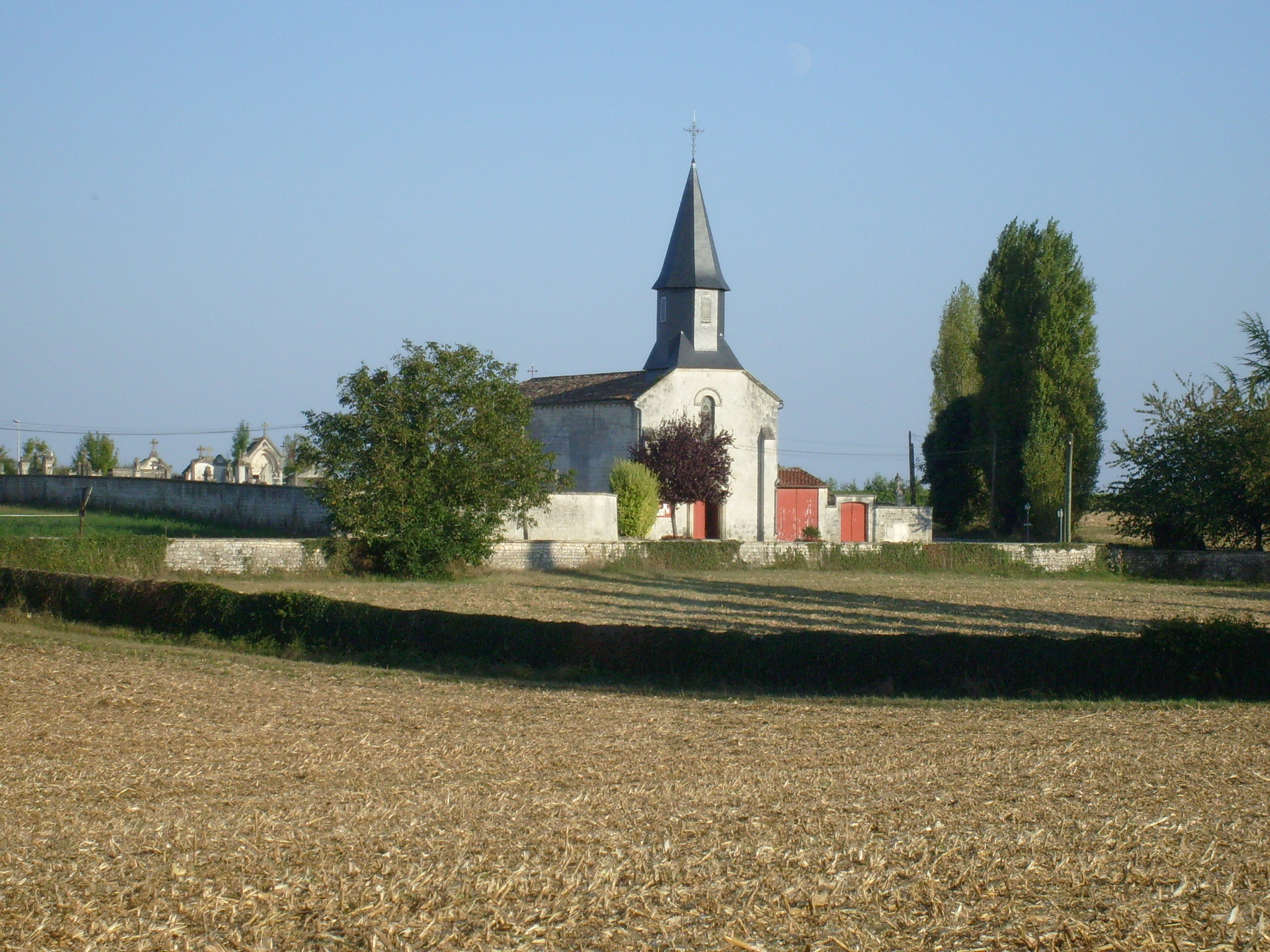
- The church and surroundings in Balanzac
- Location of Balanzac
- Location within France Location within Nouvelle-Aquitaine
- Coordinates: 45°44′33″N 0°50′04″W
- Country: France
- Region: Nouvelle-Aquitaine
- Department: Charente-Maritime
- Arrondissement: Saintes
- Canton: Saint-Porchaire

Government
  - Mayor (2020–2026): Dominique Bernard
- Area^{1}: 12.75 km^{2} (4.92 sq mi)
- Highest elevation: 39 m (128 ft)
- Lowest elevation: 17 m (56 ft)
- Population (2023): 642
  - Density: 50.4/km^{2} (130/sq mi)
- Time zone: UTC+01:00 (CET)
  - Summer (DST): UTC+02:00 (CEST)
- INSEE/Postal code: 17030 /17600
- ^{1} French Land Register data, which excludes lakes, ponds, glaciers > 1 km^{2} (0.386 sq mi or 247 acres) and river estuaries.

Balanzac (French pronunciation: [balɑ̃zak]) is a commune in the Charente-Maritime department in southwestern France.

== Population ==
Historical population
Year	Pop.	±% p.a.
1968	360	—
1975	331	−1.19%
1982	348	+0.72%
1990	355	+0.25%
1999	343	−0.38%
2007	464	+3.85%
2012	531	+2.73%
2017	549	+0.67%
2023	642	+2.64%
Source: INSEE

== See also ==
- Communes of the Charente-Maritime department
