= Nancras =

- Commune
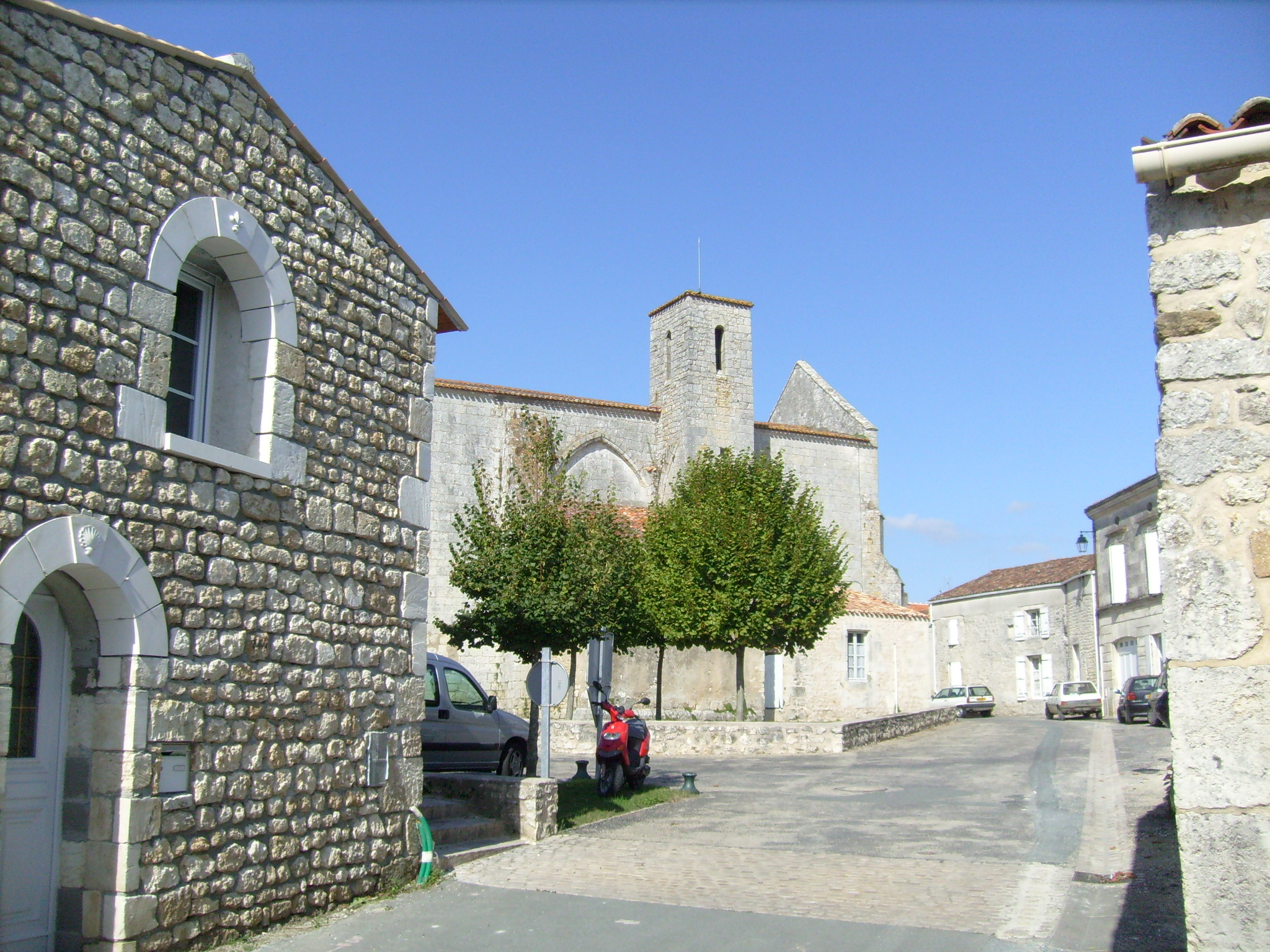
- The church and surroundings in Nancras
- Location of Nancras
- Location within France Location within Nouvelle-Aquitaine
- Coordinates: 45°44′46″N 0°52′49″W
- Country: France
- Region: Nouvelle-Aquitaine
- Department: Charente-Maritime
- Arrondissement: Saintes
- Canton: Saint-Porchaire

Government
  - Mayor (2020–2026): David Raffé
- Area^{1}: 3.06 km^{2} (1.18 sq mi)
- Highest elevation: 39 m (128 ft)
- Lowest elevation: 22 m (72 ft)
- Population (2023): 794
  - Density: 259/km^{2} (672/sq mi)
- Time zone: UTC+01:00 (CET)
  - Summer (DST): UTC+02:00 (CEST)
- INSEE/Postal code: 17255 /17600
- ^{1} French Land Register data, which excludes lakes, ponds, glaciers > 1 km^{2} (0.386 sq mi or 247 acres) and river estuaries.

Nancras (French pronunciation: [nɑ̃kʁa]) is a commune in the Charente-Maritime department in southwestern France.

== Population ==
Historical population
| Year | Pop. | ±% p.a. |
|---|---|---|
| 1968 | 303 | — |
| 1975 | 302 | −0.05% |
| 1982 | 325 | +1.05% |
| 1990 | 353 | +1.04% |
| 1999 | 418 | +1.90% |
| 2007 | 567 | +3.88% |
| 2012 | 753 | +5.84% |
| 2017 | 786 | +0.86% |
| 2023 | 794 | +0.17% |
Source: INSEE

== See also ==
- Communes of the Charente-Maritime department
