= Port-d'Envaux =

- Commune
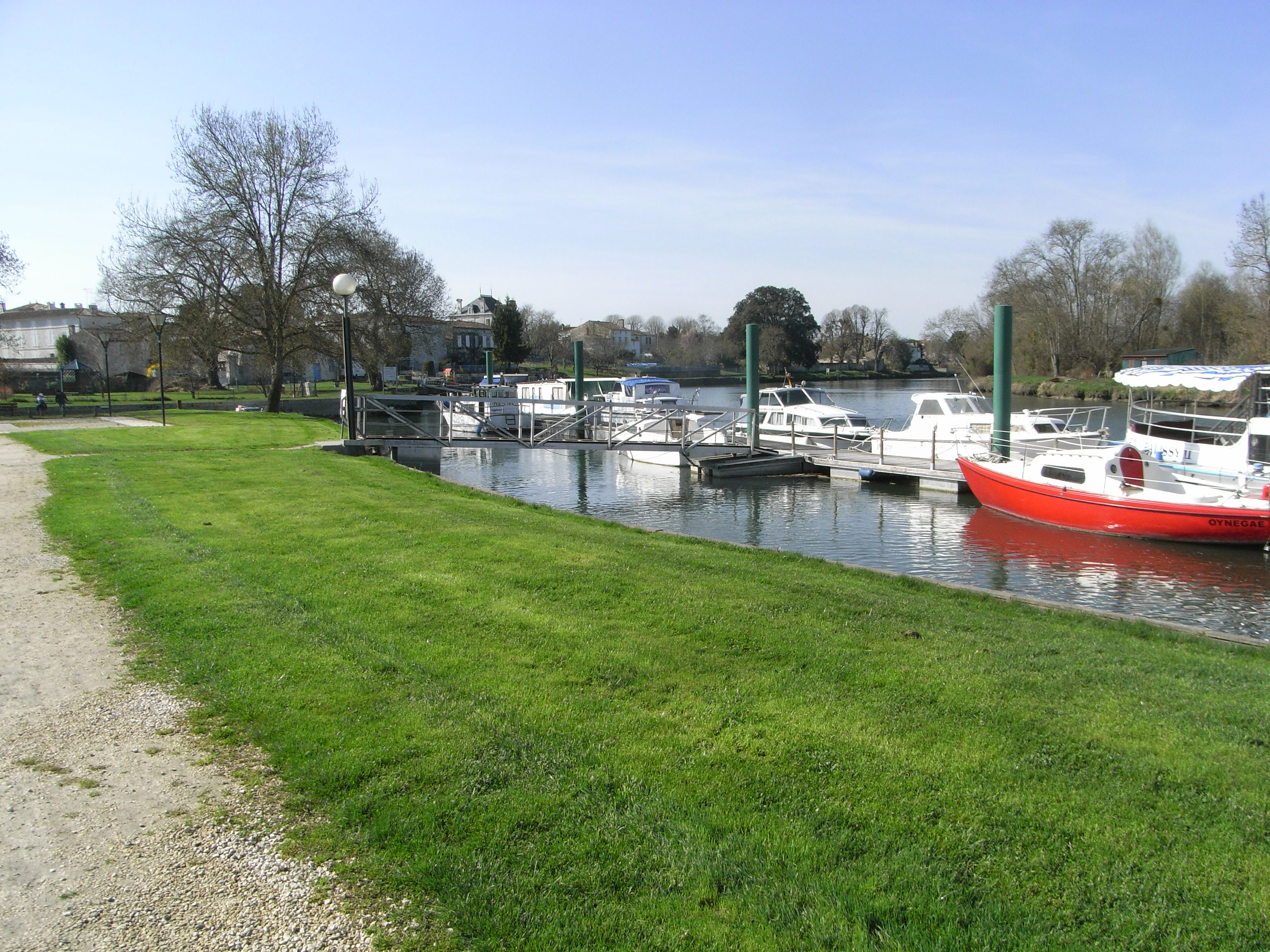
- The Charente

- Coat of arms
- Location of Port-d'Envaux
- Location within France Location within Nouvelle-Aquitaine
- Coordinates: 45°50′13″N 0°40′49″W
- Country: France
- Region: Nouvelle-Aquitaine
- Department: Charente-Maritime
- Arrondissement: Saintes
- Canton: Saint-Porchaire

Government
  - Mayor (2020–2026): Sylvain Barreaud
- Area^{1}: 22.55 km^{2} (8.71 sq mi)
- Highest elevation: 59 m (194 ft)
- Lowest elevation: 2 m (6.6 ft)
- Population (2023): 1,188
  - Density: 52.68/km^{2} (136.4/sq mi)
- Time zone: UTC+01:00 (CET)
  - Summer (DST): UTC+02:00 (CEST)
- INSEE/Postal code: 17285 /17350
- ^{1} French Land Register data, which excludes lakes, ponds, glaciers > 1 km^{2} (0.386 sq mi or 247 acres) and river estuaries.

Port-d'Envaux (French pronunciation: [pɔʁ dɑ̃vo]) is a commune in the Charente-Maritime department in southwestern France.

== Population ==
Historical population
Year	Pop.	±% p.a.
1968	1,029	—
1975	905	−1.82%
1982	1,003	+1.48%
1990	1,028	+0.31%
1999	991	−0.41%
2007	1,003	+0.15%
2012	1,120	+2.23%
2017	1,154	+0.60%
2023	1,188	+0.49%
Source: INSEE

== See also ==
- Communes of the Charente-Maritime department
