= Plassay =

- Commune
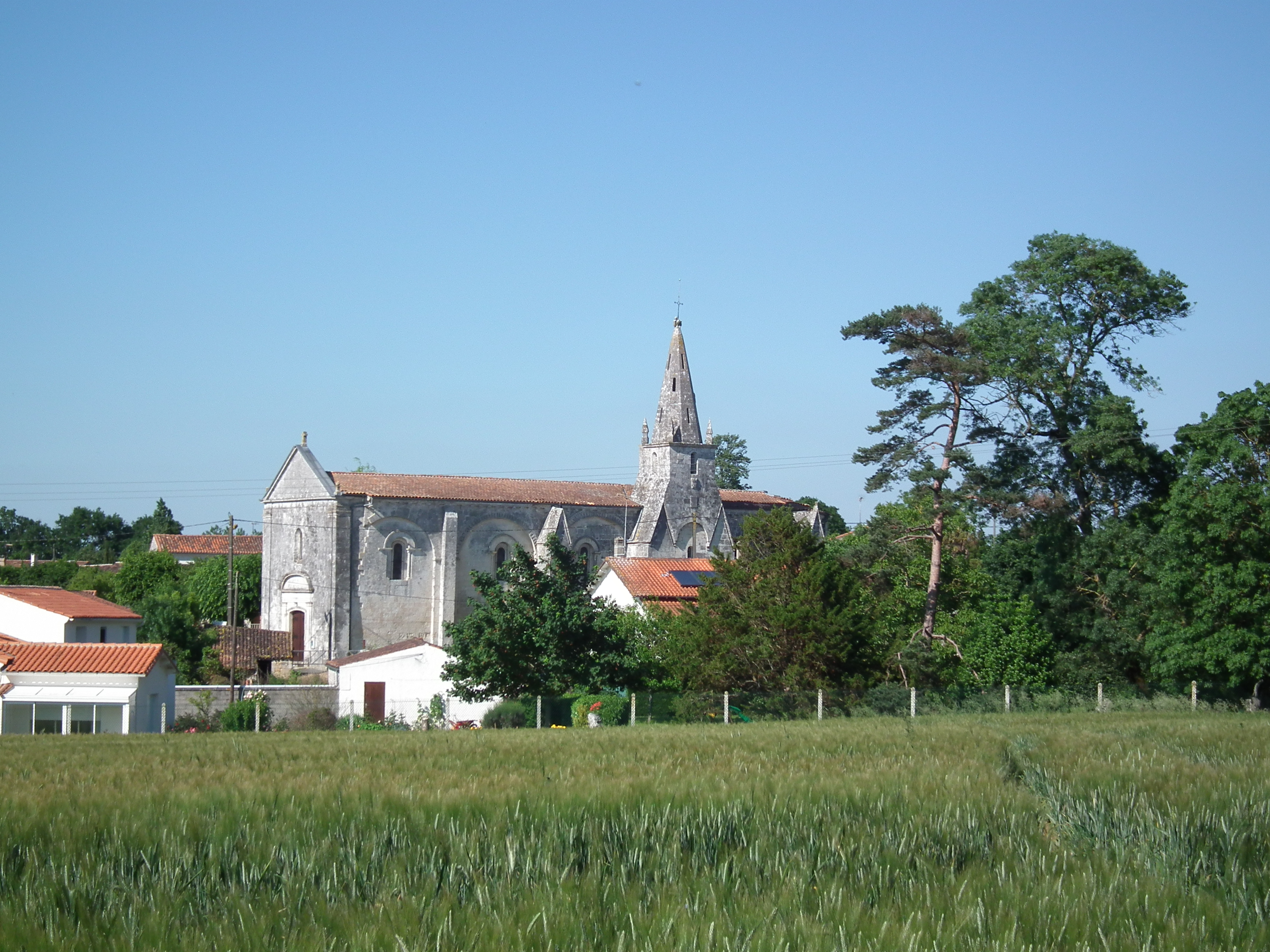
- A general view of Plassay

- Coat of arms
- Location of Plassay
- Location within France Location within Nouvelle-Aquitaine
- Coordinates: 45°49′10″N 0°43′27″W
- Country: France
- Region: Nouvelle-Aquitaine
- Department: Charente-Maritime
- Arrondissement: Saintes
- Canton: Saint-Porchaire

Government
  - Mayor (2020–2026): Patrice Bachereau
- Area^{1}: 16.87 km^{2} (6.51 sq mi)
- Highest elevation: 64 m (210 ft)
- Lowest elevation: 9 m (30 ft)
- Population (2023): 823
  - Density: 48.8/km^{2} (126/sq mi)
- Time zone: UTC+01:00 (CET)
  - Summer (DST): UTC+02:00 (CEST)
- INSEE/Postal code: 17280 /17250
- ^{1} French Land Register data, which excludes lakes, ponds, glaciers > 1 km^{2} (0.386 sq mi or 247 acres) and river estuaries.

Plassay (French pronunciation: [plasɛ]) is a commune in the Charente-Maritime department in southwestern France.

== Population ==
Historical population
Year	Pop.	±% p.a.
1968	424	—
1975	379	−1.59%
1982	433	+1.92%
1990	433	+0.00%
1999	486	+1.29%
2007	658	+3.86%
2012	702	+1.30%
2017	721	+0.54%
2023	823	+2.23%
Source: INSEE

== See also ==
- Communes of the Charente-Maritime department
