= Sainte-Gemme, Charente-Maritime =

Sainte-Gemme
- Commune
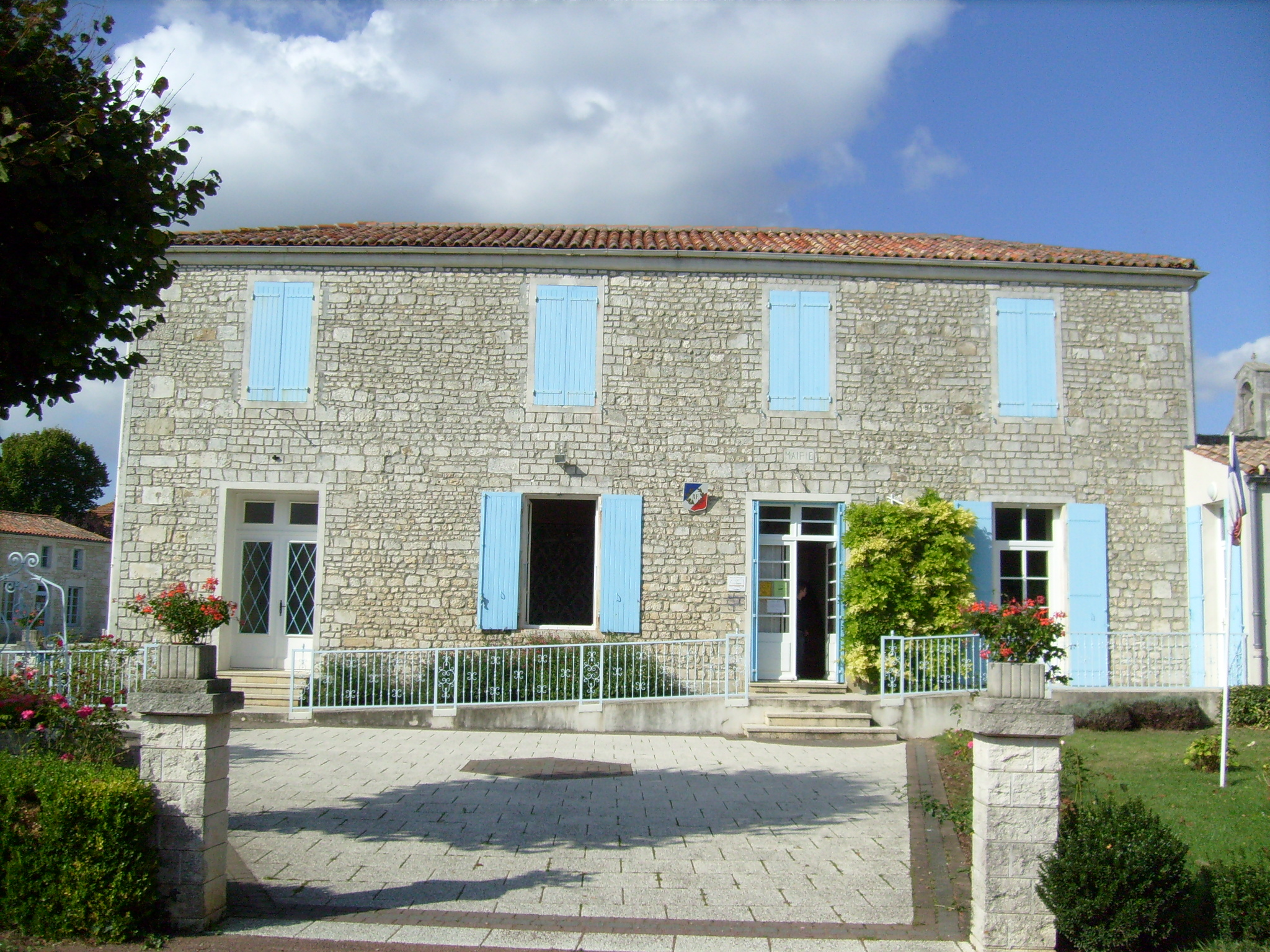
- The town hall in Sainte-Gemme

- Coat of arms
- Location of Sainte-Gemme
- Location within France Location within Nouvelle-Aquitaine
- Coordinates: 45°46′20″N 0°53′15″W
- Country: France
- Region: Nouvelle-Aquitaine
- Department: Charente-Maritime
- Arrondissement: Saintes
- Canton: Saint-Porchaire

Government
  - Mayor (2020–2026): Philippe Gachet
- Area^{1}: 40.91 km^{2} (15.80 sq mi)
- Elevation: 35 m (115 ft)
- Highest elevation: 44 m (144 ft)
- Lowest elevation: 7 m (23 ft)
- Population (2023): 1,365
  - Density: 33.37/km^{2} (86.42/sq mi)
- Time zone: UTC+01:00 (CET)
  - Summer (DST): UTC+02:00 (CEST)
- INSEE/Postal code: 17330 /17250
- ^{1} French Land Register data, which excludes lakes, ponds, glaciers > 1 km^{2} (0.386 sq mi or 247 acres) and river estuaries.

Sainte-Gemme (French pronunciation: [sɛ̃t ʒɛm]) is a commune in the Charente-Maritime department in southwestern France.

== Population ==
Historical population
| Year | Pop. | ±% p.a. |
|---|---|---|
| 1968 | 811 | — |
| 1975 | 755 | −1.02% |
| 1982 | 779 | +0.45% |
| 1990 | 869 | +1.38% |
| 1999 | 899 | +0.38% |
| 2007 | 1,218 | +3.87% |
| 2012 | 1,254 | +0.58% |
| 2017 | 1,320 | +1.03% |
| 2023 | 1,365 | +0.56% |
Source: INSEE

== See also ==
- Communes of the Charente-Maritime department
