= Saint-Sulpice-d'Arnoult =

Saint-Sulpice-d’Arnoult
- Commune
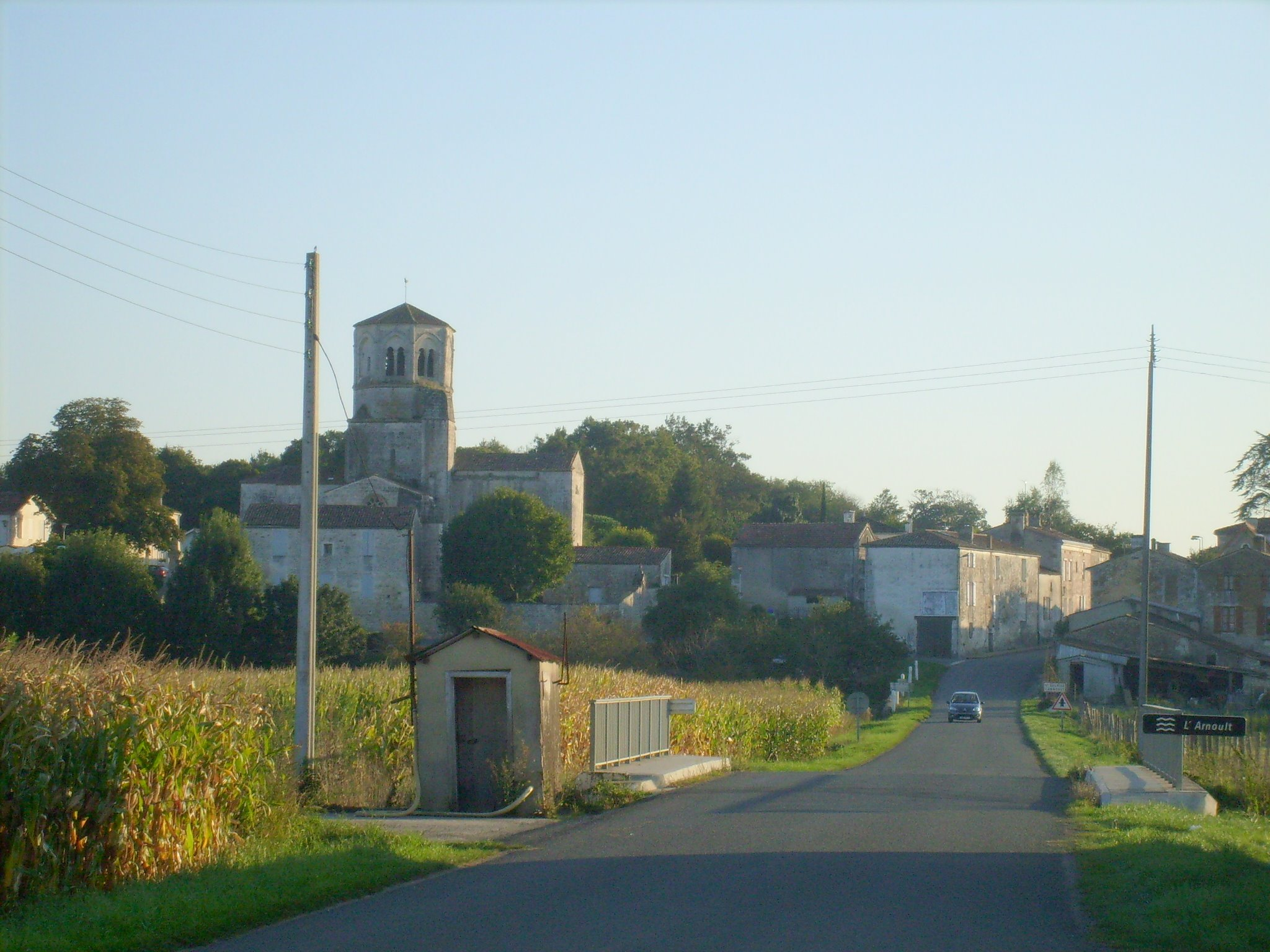

- Coat of arms
- Location of Saint-Sulpice-d’Arnoult
- Location within France Location within Nouvelle-Aquitaine
- Coordinates: 45°48′17″N 0°50′55″W
- Country: France
- Region: Nouvelle-Aquitaine
- Department: Charente-Maritime
- Arrondissement: Saintes
- Canton: Saint-Porchaire

Government
  - Mayor (2020–2026): Liliane Signat
- Area^{1}: 16.12 km^{2} (6.22 sq mi)
- Elevation: 32 m (105 ft)
- Highest elevation: 41 m (135 ft)
- Lowest elevation: 11 m (36 ft)
- Population (2023): 924
  - Density: 57.3/km^{2} (148/sq mi)
- Time zone: UTC+01:00 (CET)
  - Summer (DST): UTC+02:00 (CEST)
- INSEE/Postal code: 17408 /17250
- ^{1} French Land Register data, which excludes lakes, ponds, glaciers > 1 km^{2} (0.386 sq mi or 247 acres) and river estuaries.

Saint-Sulpice-d'Arnoult (French pronunciation: [sɛ̃ sylpis daʁnu]) is a commune in the Charente-Maritime department in southwestern France.

== Population ==
Historical population
Year	Pop.	±% p.a.
1968	385	—
1975	389	+0.15%
1982	401	+0.43%
1990	465	+1.87%
1999	491	+0.61%
2007	610	+2.75%
2012	716	+3.26%
2017	865	+3.85%
2023	924	+1.11%
Source: INSEE

== See also ==
- Communes of the Charente-Maritime department
