= Écurat =

- Commune
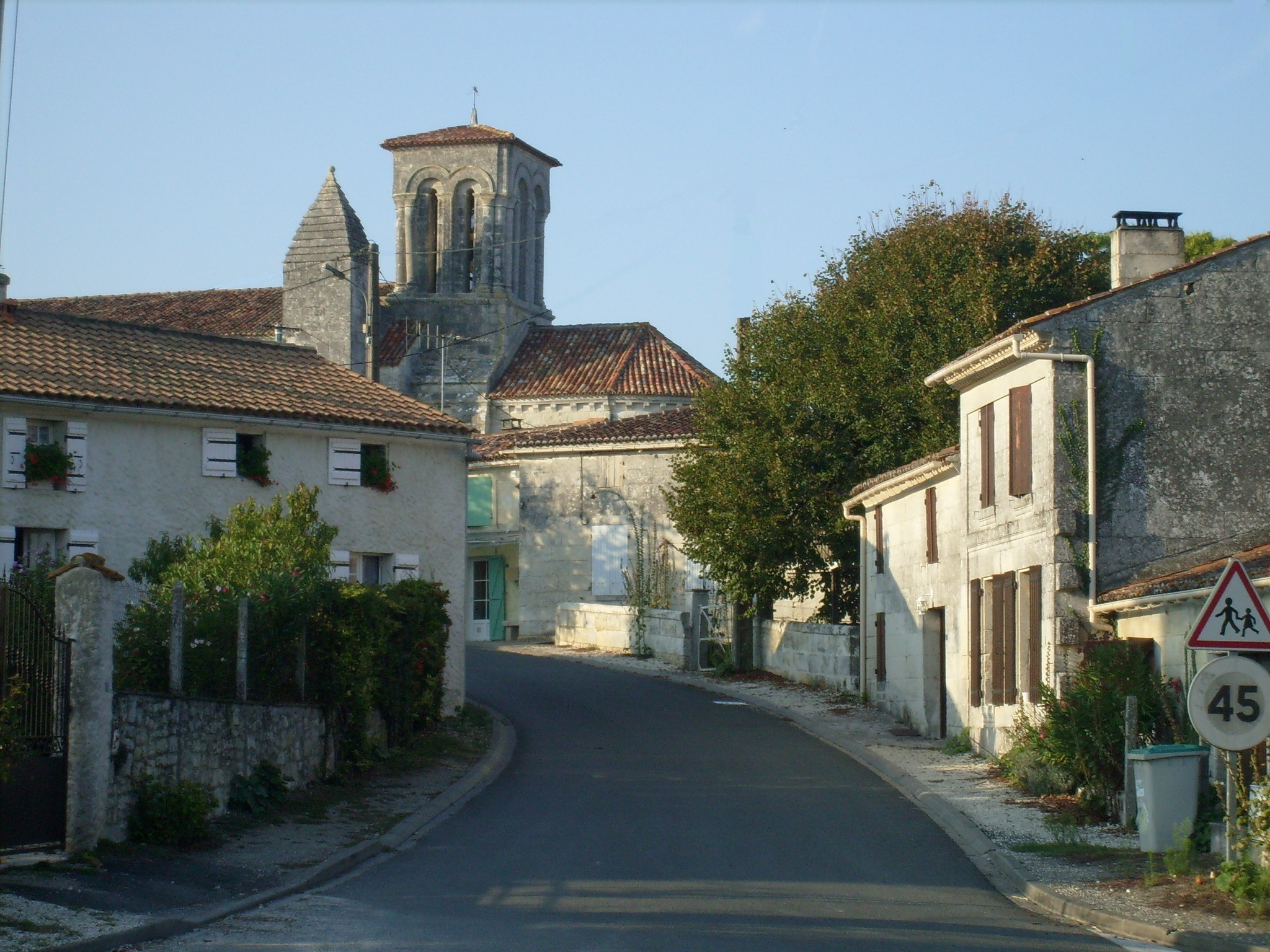
- The church and surroundings in Écurat
- Location of Écurat
- Location within France Location within Nouvelle-Aquitaine
- Coordinates: 45°47′05″N 0°40′25″W
- Country: France
- Region: Nouvelle-Aquitaine
- Department: Charente-Maritime
- Arrondissement: Saintes
- Canton: Saint-Porchaire
- Intercommunality: CA Saintes

Government
  - Mayor (2020–2026): Bernard Chaigneau
- Area^{1}: 10.55 km^{2} (4.07 sq mi)
- Elevation: 31 m (102 ft)
- Highest elevation: 69 m (226 ft)
- Lowest elevation: 14 m (46 ft)
- Population (2023): 438
  - Density: 41.5/km^{2} (108/sq mi)
- Time zone: UTC+01:00 (CET)
  - Summer (DST): UTC+02:00 (CEST)
- INSEE/Postal code: 17148 /17810
- ^{1} French Land Register data, which excludes lakes, ponds, glaciers > 1 km^{2} (0.386 sq mi or 247 acres) and river estuaries.

Écurat (French pronunciation: [ekyʁa]) is a commune in the Charente-Maritime department in southwestern France.

== Population ==
Historical population
Year	Pop.	±% p.a.
1968	212	—
1975	190	−1.55%
1982	222	+2.25%
1990	291	+3.44%
1999	361	+2.42%
2007	420	+1.91%
2012	496	+3.38%
2017	471	−1.03%
2023	438	−1.20%
Source: INSEE

== See also ==
- Communes of the Charente-Maritime department
