= Saint-Georges-des-Coteaux =

- Commune
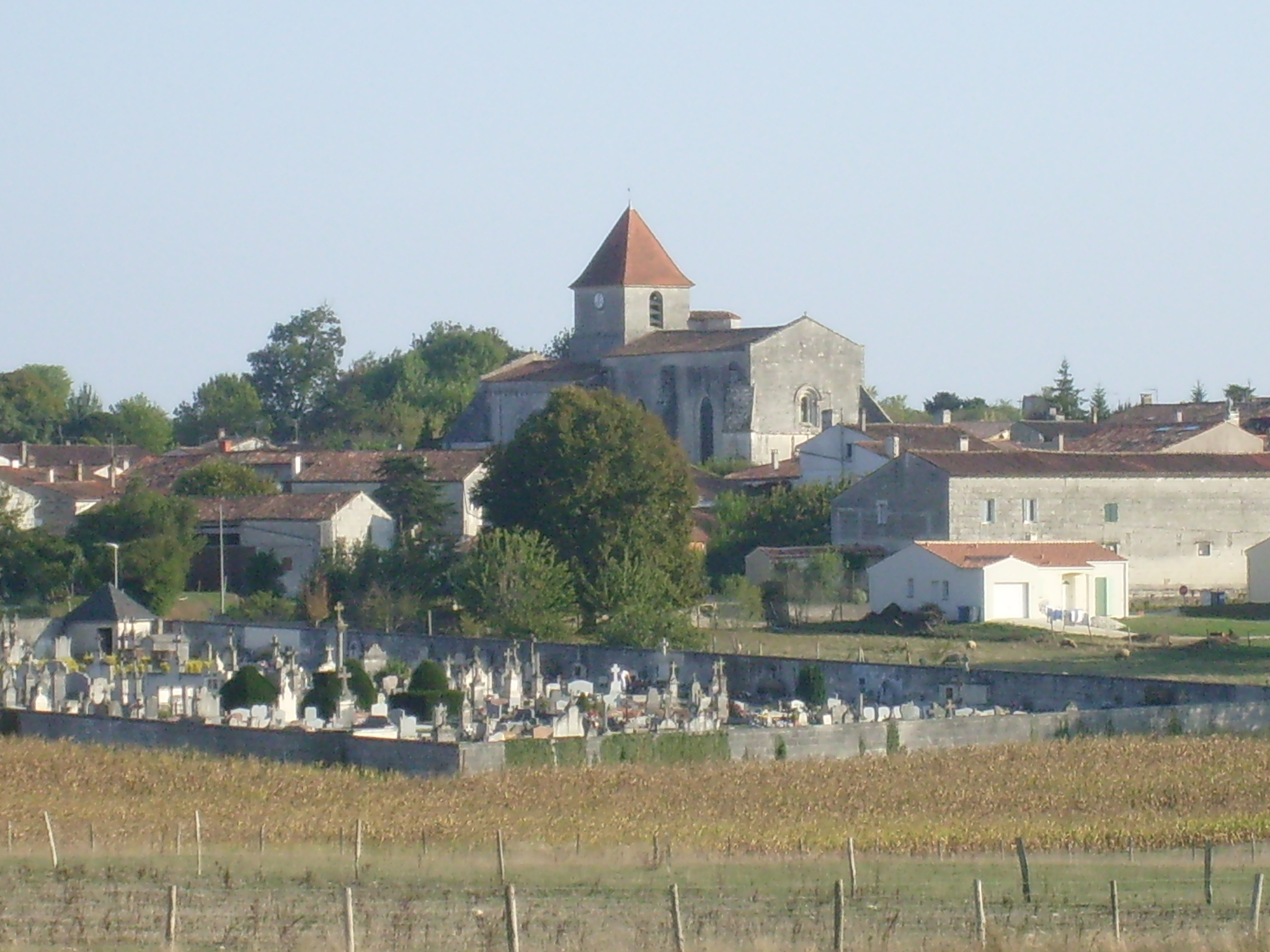
- A general view of Saint-Georges-des-Coteaux
- Location of Saint-Georges-des-Coteaux
- Location within France Location within Nouvelle-Aquitaine
- Coordinates: 45°45′47″N 0°42′39″W
- Country: France
- Region: Nouvelle-Aquitaine
- Department: Charente-Maritime
- Arrondissement: Saintes
- Canton: Saint-Porchaire
- Intercommunality: CA Saintes

Government
  - Mayor (2020–2026): Frederic Rouan
- Area^{1}: 19.23 km^{2} (7.42 sq mi)
- Highest elevation: 81 m (266 ft)
- Lowest elevation: 13 m (43 ft)
- Population (2023): 2,843
  - Density: 147.8/km^{2} (382.9/sq mi)
- Time zone: UTC+01:00 (CET)
  - Summer (DST): UTC+02:00 (CEST)
- INSEE/Postal code: 17336 /17810
- ^{1} French Land Register data, which excludes lakes, ponds, glaciers > 1 km^{2} (0.386 sq mi or 247 acres) and river estuaries.

Saint-Georges-des-Coteaux (French pronunciation: [sɛ̃ ʒɔʁʒ de kɔto]) is a commune in the Charente-Maritime department in southwestern France.

== Population ==
Historical population
Year	Pop.	±% p.a.
1968	880	—
1975	1,275	+5.44%
1982	1,780	+4.88%
1990	1,912	+0.90%
1999	2,028	+0.66%
2007	2,481	+2.55%
2012	2,603	+0.96%
2017	2,692	+0.67%
2023	2,843	+0.91%
Source: INSEE

== See also ==
- Communes of the Charente-Maritime department
