= Pont-l'Abbé-d'Arnoult =

- Commune
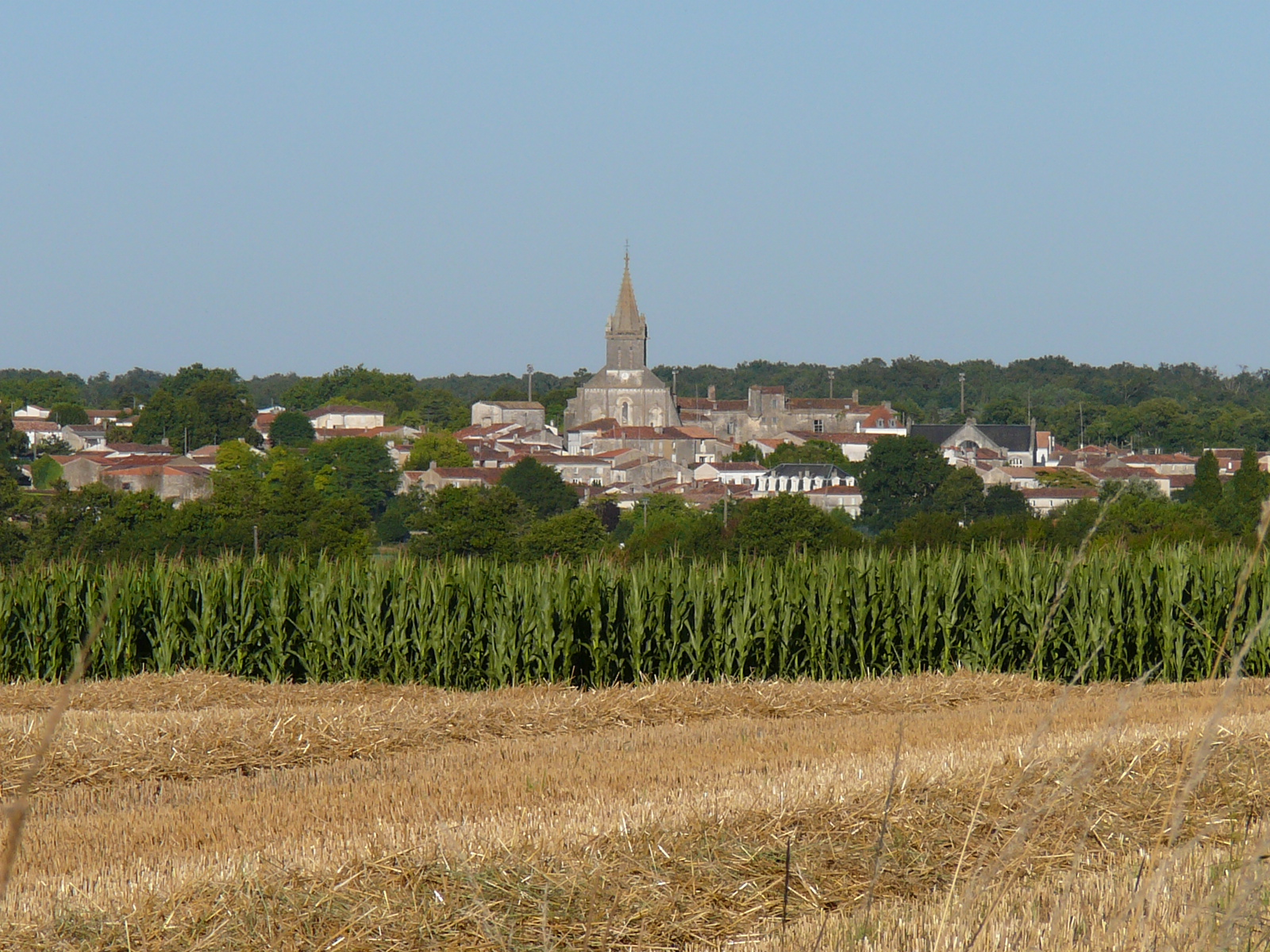
- A general view of Pont-l'Abbé-d'Arnoult
- Location of Pont-l'Abbé-d'Arnoult
- Location within France Location within Nouvelle-Aquitaine
- Coordinates: 45°49′40″N 0°52′31″W
- Country: France
- Region: Nouvelle-Aquitaine
- Department: Charente-Maritime
- Arrondissement: Saintes
- Canton: Saint-Porchaire

Government
  - Mayor (2020–2026): Alexandre Schneider
- Area^{1}: 12.41 km^{2} (4.79 sq mi)
- Highest elevation: 41 m (135 ft)
- Lowest elevation: 6 m (20 ft)
- Population (2023): 1,811
  - Density: 145.9/km^{2} (378.0/sq mi)
- Time zone: UTC+01:00 (CET)
  - Summer (DST): UTC+02:00 (CEST)
- INSEE/Postal code: 17284 /17250
- ^{1} French Land Register data, which excludes lakes, ponds, glaciers > 1 km^{2} (0.386 sq mi or 247 acres) and river estuaries.

Pont-l'Abbé-d'Arnoult (French pronunciation: [pɔ̃ labe daʁnu], before 1962: Pont-l'Abbé) is a commune in the Charente-Maritime department in southwestern France.

== Population ==
Historical population
Year	Pop.	±% p.a.
1968	1,295	—
1975	1,341	+0.50%
1982	1,362	+0.22%
1990	1,385	+0.21%
1999	1,743	+2.59%
2007	1,797	+0.38%
2012	1,734	−0.71%
2017	1,807	+0.83%
2023	1,811	+0.04%
Source: INSEE

== See also ==
- Communes of the Charente-Maritime department
