= Beurlay =

- Commune
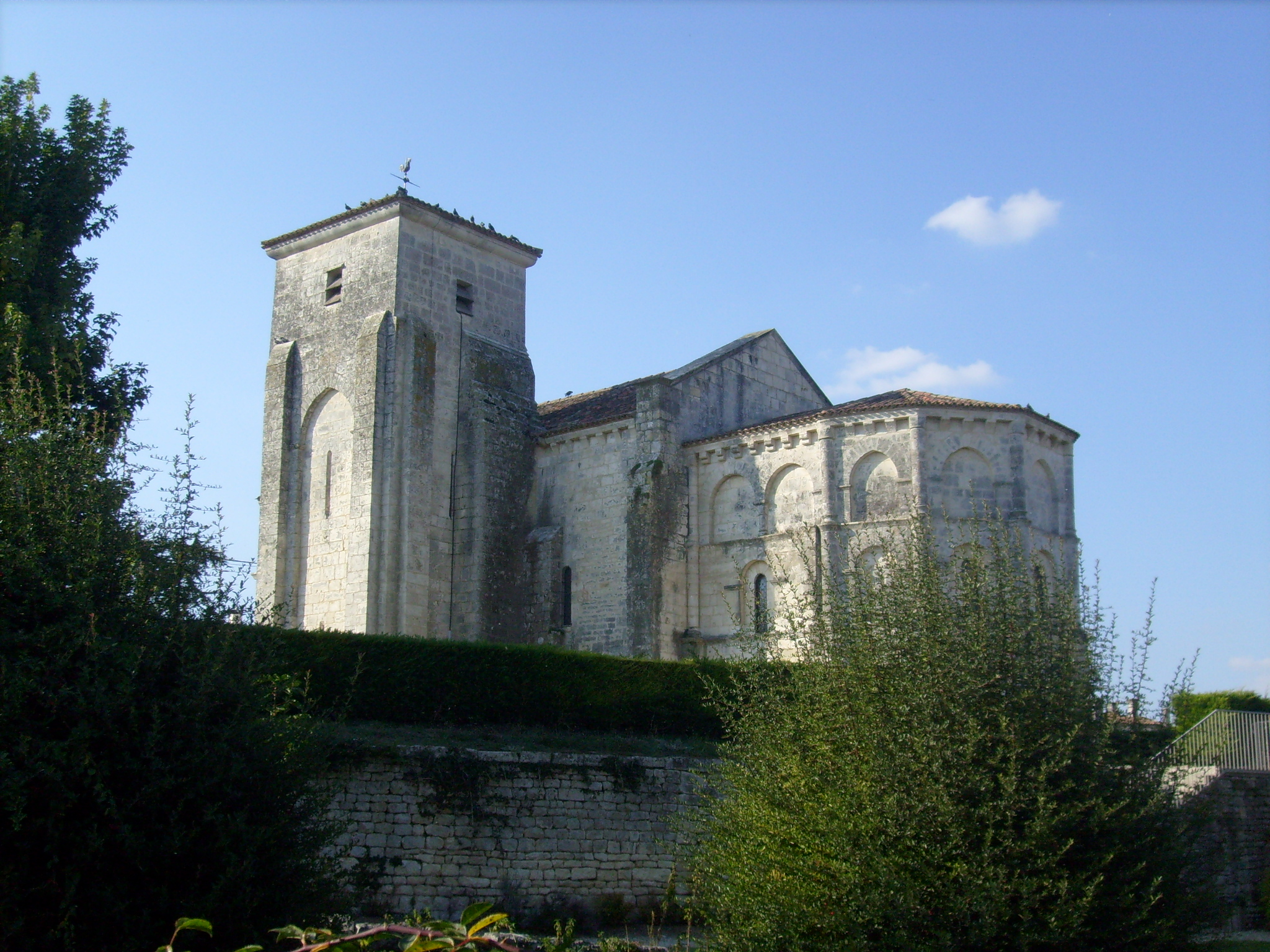
- The St. Magdalene Church, Beurlay
- Location of Beurlay
- Location within France Location within Nouvelle-Aquitaine
- Coordinates: 45°51′40″N 0°50′09″W
- Country: France
- Region: Nouvelle-Aquitaine
- Department: Charente-Maritime
- Arrondissement: Saintes
- Canton: Saint-Porchaire

Government
  - Mayor (2020–2026): Gérard Gandauber
- Area^{1}: 9.71 km^{2} (3.75 sq mi)
- Highest elevation: 40 m (130 ft)
- Lowest elevation: 5 m (16 ft)
- Population (2023): 994
  - Density: 102/km^{2} (265/sq mi)
- Time zone: UTC+01:00 (CET)
  - Summer (DST): UTC+02:00 (CEST)
- INSEE/Postal code: 17045 /17250
- ^{1} French Land Register data, which excludes lakes, ponds, glaciers > 1 km^{2} (0.386 sq mi or 247 acres) and river estuaries.

Beurlay (French pronunciation: [bœʁlɛ]) is a commune in the French department of Charente-Maritime, in the administrative region of Nouvelle-Aquitaine (before 2015: Poitou-Charentes), France.

Beurlay is twinned with the village of Burley, Hampshire, UK.

It being known for the biscuit factory in the same name, established 1848 by the Barraud family, who produces the Galette Charentaise.

It is located about 17 km (10.5 mi) from Rochefort.

== Population ==
Historical population
Year	Pop.	±% p.a.
1968	604	—
1975	573	−0.75%
1982	652	+1.86%
1990	731	+1.44%
1999	756	+0.37%
2007	962	+3.06%
2012	1,002	+0.82%
2017	1,034	+0.63%
2023	994	−0.66%
Source: INSEE

== See also ==
- Communes of the Charente-Maritime department
