= Geay, Charente-Maritime =

Geay
- Commune
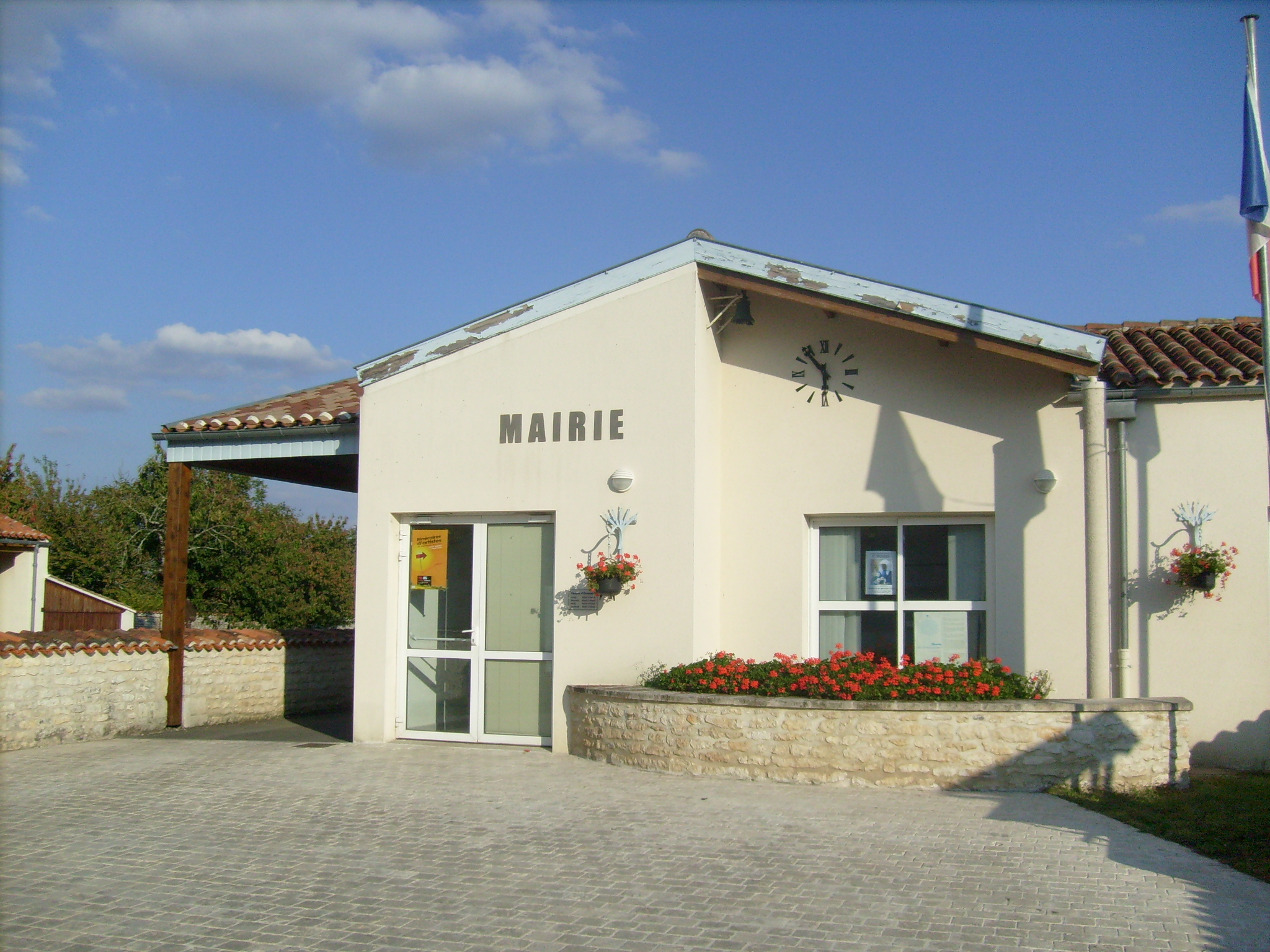
- The town hall in Geay
- Location of Geay
- Location within France Location within Nouvelle-Aquitaine
- Coordinates: 45°52′21″N 0°45′51″W
- Country: France
- Region: Nouvelle-Aquitaine
- Department: Charente-Maritime
- Arrondissement: Saintes
- Canton: Saint-Porchaire

Government
  - Mayor (2020–2026): Jacky Michaud
- Area^{1}: 15.9 km^{2} (6.1 sq mi)
- Highest elevation: 30 m (98 ft)
- Lowest elevation: 1 m (3.3 ft)
- Population (2023): 788
  - Density: 49.6/km^{2} (128/sq mi)
- Time zone: UTC+01:00 (CET)
  - Summer (DST): UTC+02:00 (CEST)
- INSEE/Postal code: 17171 /17250
- ^{1} French Land Register data, which excludes lakes, ponds, glaciers > 1 km^{2} (0.386 sq mi or 247 acres) and river estuaries.

Geay (French pronunciation: [ʒɛ]) is a commune in the Charente-Maritime department in southwestern France.

== Population ==
Historical population
Year	Pop.	±% p.a.
1968	509	—
1975	460	−1.44%
1982	444	−0.50%
1990	464	+0.55%
1999	570	+2.31%
2007	644	+1.54%
2012	705	+1.83%
2017	747	+1.16%
2023	788	+0.89%
Source: INSEE

== See also ==
- Communes of the Charente-Maritime department
