= Canton of Saint-Porchaire =

Coordinates: 45.82°N 0.78°W

The canton of Saint-Porchaire is an administrative division of the Charente-Maritime department, western France. Its borders were modified at the French canton reorganisation which came into effect in March 2015. Its seat is in Saint-Porchaire.

It consists of the following communes:

1. Balanzac
2. Beurlay
3. Crazannes
4. Écurat
5. Les Essards
6. Geay
7. Nancras
8. Nieul-lès-Saintes
9. Plassay
10. Pont-l'Abbé-d'Arnoult
11. Port-d'Envaux
12. Romegoux
13. Sainte-Gemme
14. Sainte-Radegonde
15. Saint-Georges-des-Coteaux
16. Saint-Porchaire
17. Saint-Sulpice-d'Arnoult
18. Soulignonne
19. Trizay
20. La Vallée
