= List of windmills in Charente-Maritime =

A list of windmills in Charente-Maritime, France

Location	Name of mill	Type	Built	Notes	Photograph
Angliers	Moulin Gelot	Moulin Tour			
Arces-les-Coutures	Moulin Armel	Moulin Tour		Moulins-a-Vent (in French)	
Arces-les-Coutures	Moulin de Liboulas	Moulin Tour		Moulins-a-Vent (in French)	
Arces-les-Coutures	Moulin d'Arces	Moulin Tour		Moulins-a-Vent (in French)	
Ars-en-Ré	Moulin de la Boire	Moulin Tour		Moulins-a-Vent (in French)	
Ars-en-Ré	Moulin de la Grelière	Moulin Tour		Moulins-a-Vent (in French)	
Arvert	Moulin Etrade	Moulin Tour		Moulins-a-Vent (in French)	
Arvert	Moulin du Petit Pont	Moulin Tour		Moulins-a-Vent (in French)	
Arvert	Moulin des Mathes; Moulin de la Palmyre	Moulin Tour		Moulins-a-Vent (in French)	
Barzan	Moulin du Fa	Moulin Tour		Moulins-a-Vent (in French)	
Beurlay	Moulin Rouge	Moulin Tour		Moulins-a-Vent (in French)	
Beurlay	Moulin de la Croix			Moulins-a-Vent (in French)	
Berneuil		Moulin Tour			
Bords	Moulin de Groiquetier	Moulin Tour		Moulins-a-Vent (in French)	
Bougneau	Moulin de Levreau	Moulin Tour		Moulins-a-Vent (in French)	
Bourcefranc-le-Chapus	Moulin de la Plataine	Moulin Tour		Moulins-a-Vent (in French)	
Bourcefranc-le-Chapus	Moulin aux Rue Émile Zola	Moulin Tour		Moulins-a-Vent (in French)	
Boutenac-Touvent	Moulin de la Lande	Moulin Tour		Moulins-a-Vent (in French)	
Brie-sous-Mortagne	Moulin du Puits Marteau	Moulin Tour		Moulins-a-Vent (in French)	
Brie-sous-Mortagne	Le Petit Moulin	Moulin Tour		Moulins-a-Vent (in French)	
Champagnac	Moulin de Patier	Moulin Tour		Moulins-a-Vent (in French)	
Champagnolles	Moulin a Champagnolles	Moulin Tour		Moulins-a-Vent (in French)	
Chenac-Saint-Seurin-d'Uzet	Moulin de l'Echallier	Moulin Tour		Moulins-a-Vent (in French)	
Chenac-Saint-Seurin-d'Uzet	Moulin du Petit Chenac #1	Moulin Tour		Moulins-a-Vent (in French)	
Chenac-Saint-Seurin-d'Uzet	Moulin du Petit Chenac #2	Moulin Tour		Moulins-a-Vent (in French)	
Chenac-Saint-Seurin-d'Uzet	Moulin des Monards			Moulins-a-Vent (in French)	
Chevanceaux	Moulin de Chevanceaux	Moulin Tour			
Corme-Royal	Moulin des Germains	Moulin Tour		Moulins-a-Vent (in French)	
Corme-Royal	Moulin de Fribaud Tetaud	Moulin Tour		Moulins-a-Vent (in French)	
Cozes	Moulin de Roumignac	Moulin Tour		Moulins-a-Vent (in French)	
Cozes	Moulins dans le Rue des Trois Moulins	Moulin Tour		Three mills Moulins-a-Vent (in French)	
Crazannes	Moulin des Combes	Moulin Tour		Moulins-a-Vent (in French)	
Crazannes	Moulin de Perrières	Moulin Tour		Moulins-a-Vent (in French)	
Dolus-d'Oléron	Moulin de l'Aubrevoir	Moulin Tour		Moulins-a-Vent (in French)	
Dolus-d'Oleron	Moulin Poterie	Moulin Tour		Moulins-a-Vent (in French)	
Esnandes	Moulin d'Esnandes	Moulin Tour		Moulins-a-Vent (in French)	
Floirac	Moulin de la Champagne	Moulin Tour		Moulins-a-Vent (in French)	
Floirac	Moulin de Clopilet	Moulin Tour		Moulins-a-Vent (in French)	
Floirac	Moulin de la Sablière	Moulin Tour	1880	Moulins-a-Vent (in French)	
Forges	Moulin de Puydroudard	Moulin Tour	c. 1580	Moulins-a-Vent (in French)	
Fouras	Moulin de l'Aubier	Moulin Tour		Moulins-a-Vent (in French)	
Fouras	Moulin de l'Espérance	Moulin Tour		Moulins-a-Vent (in French)	
Fouras	Moulin de Soumard	Moulin Tour		Moulins-a-Vent (in French)	
Grézac	Moulin des Alluchons	Moulin Tour		Moulins-a-Vent (in French)	
Jazennes	Moulin Gazon	Moulin Tour		Moulins-a-Vent (in French)	
Jonzac	Moulin Trompe l'Amour	Moulin Tour		Moulins-a-Vent (in French)	
Jonzac	Moulin du Cluzelet	Moulin Tour		Moulins-a-Vent (in French)	
La Brée-les-Bains	Moulin de la Brée	Moulin Tour		Moulins-a-Vent (in French)	
Lagord	Moulin Benoist	Moulin Tour		Moulins-a-Vent (in French)	
Lagord	Moulin Vendôme	Moulin Tour		Moulins-a-Vent (in French)	
La Tremblade	Moulin a La Tremblade	Moulin Tour		Moulins-a-Vent (in French)	
Le Bois-Plage-en-Ré	Moulin Bellerre; Moulin du Morinand	Moulin Tour		Moulins-a-Vent (in French)	
Le Château-d'Oléron	Moulin Caillot				
Le Cháteau-d'Oléron	Moulin de la Côte				
Le Château-d'Oléron	Moulin de Le Château d'Oléron #1	Moulin Tour		Moulins-a-Vent (in French)	
Le Château-d'Oléron	Moulin de Le Château d'Oléron #2	Moulin Tour		Moulins-a-Vent (in French)	
Le Gua	Moulin a Le Gua	Moulin Tour		Moulins-a-Vent (in French)	
Les Nouillers	Moulin de la Planche	Moulin Tour			
Loiré-sur-Nie	Moulin Les Groies	Moulin Tour	1856	Moulins-a-Vent (in French)	
Loiré-sur-Nie	Moulin de Loiré sur Nie	Moulin Tour		Moulins-a-Vent (in French)	
Loix-en-Ré	Moulin des Tourettes	Moulin Tour		Moulins-a-Vent (in French)	
Lorignac	Moulin de la Bertonnière	Moulin Tour		Moulins-a-Vent (in French)	
Lorignac	Moulin de Barret	Moulin Tour		Moulins-a-Vent (in French)	
Lussant	Moulin de Crolard	Moulin Tour			
Luzac	Moulin de Pillerit	Moulin Tour		Moulins-a-Vent (in French)	
Luzac	Moulin aux Quatre Moulins	Moulin Tour		Moulins-a-Vent (in French)	
Marans	Moulin de Beauregard	Moulin Tour		Moulins-a-Vent (in French)	
Marans	Moulin de la Generelle	Moulin Tour		Moulins-a-Vent (in French)	
Marennes	Moulins de Marennes	Moulin Tour		Three mills Moulins-a-Vent (in French)	
Marsilly			Moulin Tour	House conversion	
Médis	Moulin de Pouyaud	Moulin Tour		Moulins-a-Vent (in French)	
Médis	Moulin Didonne; Moulin de Pousseau	Moulin Tour		Moulins-a-Vent (in French)	
Meschers-sur-Gironde	Moulin Berbezac				
Mirambeau	Moulin de Mirambeau	Moulin Tour		Moulins-a-Vent (in French)	
Mirambeau	Moulin des Heards	Moulin Tour		Moulins-a-Vent (in French)	
Montguyon	Moulin Chez Bertaud				
Mortagne-sur-Gironde	Moulin de Pinson	Moulin Tour		Moulins-a-Vent (in French)	
Mortagne-sur-Gironde	Moulin au Cours Bellevue	Moulin Tour		Moulins-a-Vent (in French)	
Mortiers	Moulin de Bapaille				
Néré	Moulin des Groies	Moulin Tour		Moulins-a-Vent (in French)	
Neulles		Moulin Tour			
Nieul-sur-Mer	Moulin Ragot	Moulin Tour		Moulins-a-Vent (in French)	
Nieul-sur-Mer	Moulin de Neuil sur Mer	Moulin Tour		Moulins-a-Vent (in French)	
Plassay	Moulin des Fougères	Moulin Tour		Moulins-a-Vent (in French)	
Pont-l'Abbé-d'Arnoult	Moulin Rue des Guilloteaux #1	Moulin Tour		Moulins-a-Vent (in French)	
Pont-l'Abbé-d'Arnoult	Moulin Rue des Guilloteaux #2	Moulin Tour		Moulins-a-Vent (in French)	
Pont-l'Abbé-d'Arnoult	Moulin Rue des Guilloteaux #3	Moulin Tour		Moulins-a-Vent (in French)	
Pont-l'Abbé-d'Arnoult	Moulin à l'entréeé de la ville	Moulin Tour		Moulins-a-Vent (in French)	
Pont-l'Abbé-d'Arnoult	Moulin Rue des Geraniums	Moulin Tour		Moulins-a-Vent (in French)	
Pont-l'Abbé-d'Arnoult	Moulin	Moulin Tour		Moulins-a-Vent (in French)	
Pont-l'Abbé-d'Arnoult	Moulin	Moulin Tour		House conversion Moulins-a-Vent (in French)	
Pont-l'Abbé-d'Arnoult	Moulin à Pipelé #1	Moulin Tour		Moulins-a-Vent (in French)	
Pont-l'Abbé-d'Arnoult	Moulin à Pipelé #2	Moulin Tour		Moulins-a-Vent (in French)	
Puy-du-Lac	Moulin de la Jarrie	Moulin Tour			
Rochefort	Moulin du Puy Vineux	Moulin Tour		Moulins-a-Vent (in French)	
Sablonceaux	Moulin de la Salle	Moulin Tour		Moulins-a-Vent (in French)	
Saint-Ciers-Champagne	Moulin de Jeanette	Moulin Tour		Moulins-a-Vent (in French)	
Saint-Ciers-du-Taillon	Moulin des Tillauds	Moulin Tour		Moulins-a-Vent (in French)	
Saint-Ciers-du-Taillon	Moulin de la Fuie	Moulin Tour		Moulins-a-Vent (in French)	
Saint-Ciers-du-Taillon	Moulin de la Moussetterie	Moulin Tour		Moulins-a-Vent (in French)	
Saint-Clément-des-Baleines	Moulin Rouge; Moulin Daniel	Moulin Tour		Moulins-a-Vent (in French)	
Saint-Denis-d'Oléron	Moulin des Cordonnières				
Saint-Denis-d'Oléron	Moulin des Combes'	Moulin Tour		Moulins-a-Vent (in French)	
Saint-Denis-d'Oléron	Moulin de la Fabrique				
Saint-Denis-d'Oléron	Moulin des Ménounières	Moulin Tour	1656	Moulins-a-Vent (in French)	
Saint-Denis-d'Olèron	Moulin Neuf	Moulin Tour		Moulins-a-Vent (in French)	
Saint-Dizant-du-Bois	Moulin de St Dizant	Moulin Tour		Moulins-a-Vent (in French)	
Saint-Fort-sur-Gironde	Moulin de Poupot #1	Moulin Tour		Moulins-a-Vent (in French)	
Saint-Fort-sur-Gironde	Moulin de Poupot #2	Moulin Tour		Moulins-a-Vent (in French)	
Saint-Georges-d'Oléron	Moulin de Douhet	Moulin Tour		Moulins-a-Vent (in French)	
Saint-Georges-d'Oléron	Moulin de la Blanchardière'	Moulin Tour		Moulins-a-Vent (in French)	
Saint-Georges-d'Oléron	Moulin des Landes				
Saint-Georges-d'Oléron	Moulin Marchand				
Saint-Georges-d'Oléron	Moulin Sauzelle				
Saint-Georges-des-Coteaux	Moulin du Bourg	Moulin Tour		Moulins-a-Vent (in French)	
Saint-Germain-de-Vibrac	Moulin de Chaillot #1	Moulin Tour		Moulins-a-Vent (in French)	
Saint-Germain-de-Vibrac	Moulin de Chaillot #2	Moulin Tour		Moulins-a-Vent (in French)	
Saint-Just-Luzac	Moulin des Quatre Moulins	Moulin Tour		Moulins-a-Vent (in French)	
Saint-Just-Luzac	Moulin de la Combe	Moulin Tour		Moulins-a-Vent (in French)	
Saint-Just-Luzac	Moulin de Luzac	Moulin Tour		Moulins-a-Vent (in French)	
Saint-Just-Luzac	Moulin des Sables	Moulin Tour		Moulins-a-Vent (in French)	
Saint-Lheurine	'Moulin d'Arthus	Moulin Tour			
Saint-Maigrin	Moulin de Passignac	Moulin Tour		Moulins-a-Vent (in French)	
Saint-Martin-de-Juillers	Moulin de St Martin de Juillers	Moulin Tour		Moulins-a-Vent (in French)	
Saint-Pierre-de-Juillers	Moulin pres de Courgeon	Moulin Tour		Moulins-a-Vent (in French)	
Saint-Pierre-d'Oléron	Moulin de l'Aubier				
Saint-Pierre-d'Oléron	Moulin de la Borderie	Moulin Tour		Moulins-a-Vent (in French)	
Saint-Pierre-d'Oléron	Moulin du Bois Fleury				
Saint-Pierre-d'Oléron	Moulin de la Chefmalière				
Saint-Pierre-d'Oléron	Moulin Blanc; Moulin du Coivre	Moulin Tour		Moulins-a-Vent (in French)	
Saint-Pierre-d'Oléron	Moulin des Gaillardes				
Saint-Pierre-d'Oléron	Moulin de la Poyade	Moulin Tour		Moulins-a-Vent (in French)	
Saint-Pierre-d'Oléron	Moulin de la Pierre Levée	Moulin Tour		Moulins-a-Vent (in French)	
Saint-Porchaire	Moulin de St Porchaire #1	Moulin Tour		Moulins-a-Vent (in French)	
Saint-Porchaire	Moulin de St Porchaire #2	Moulin Tour		Moulins-a-Vent (in French)	
Saint-Savinien	Moulin de la Licorne	Moulin Tour		Moulins-a-Vent (in French)	
Saint-Savinien	Moulin de la Quine			Moulins-a-Vent (in French)	
Saint-Sornin	Moulin du Grand Fief	Moulin Tour		Moulins-a-Vent (in French)	
Saint-Sornin	Moulin de la Mauvinière	Moulin Tour		Moulins-a-Vent (in French)	
Saint-Sulpice-d'Arnoult	Moulin de Jeuzet	Moulin Tour		Moulins-a-Vent (in French)	
Saint-Sulpice-d'Arnoult	Moulin de St Sulpice	Moulin Tour		Moulins-a-Vent (in French)	
Saint-Thomas-de-Conac	Moulin de la Croix #1	Moulin Tour		Moulins-a-Vent (in French)	
Saint-Thomas-de-Conac	Moulin de la Croix #2	Moulin Tour		Moulins-a-Vent (in French)	
Saint-Thomas-de-Conac	Moulin de la Parée	Moulin Tour		Moulins-a-Vent (in French)	
Saint-Thomas-de-Conac	Moulin de Chez Vieuille	Moulin Tour		Moulins-a-Vent (in French)	
Saint-Thomas-de-Conac	Moulin de la Grassière	Moulin Tour		Moulins-a-Vent (in French)	
Sainte-Ramée	Moulin de Ste Ramée #1	Moulin Tour		Moulins-a-Vent (in French)	
Sainte-Ramée	Moulin de Ste Ramée #2	Moulin Tour		Moulins-a-Vent (in French)	
Sainte-Ramée	Moulin de Chez Guillet	Moulin Tour		Moulins-a-Vent (in French)	
Semussac	Moulin du Canard	Moulin Tour		Moulins-a-Vent (in French)	
Soulignonne	Moulin de Charenton	Moulin Tour		Moulins-a-Vent (in French)	
Soulignonne	Moulin de Soulignonne #1	Moulin Tour		Moulins-a-Vent (in French)	
Soulignonne	Moulin de Soulignonne #2	Moulin Tour		Moulins-a-Vent (in French)	
Soulignonne	Moulin de Soulignonne #3	Moulin Tour		Moulins-a-Vent (in French)	
Soulignonne	Moulin de Soulignonne #4	Moulin Tour		Moulins-a-Vent (in French)	
Soulignonne	Moulin du Brandet	Moulin Tour		Moulins-a-Vent (in French)	
Torxé	Moulin de St Marmé	Moulin Tour		Moulins-a-Vent (in French)	
