= Arces =

- Commune
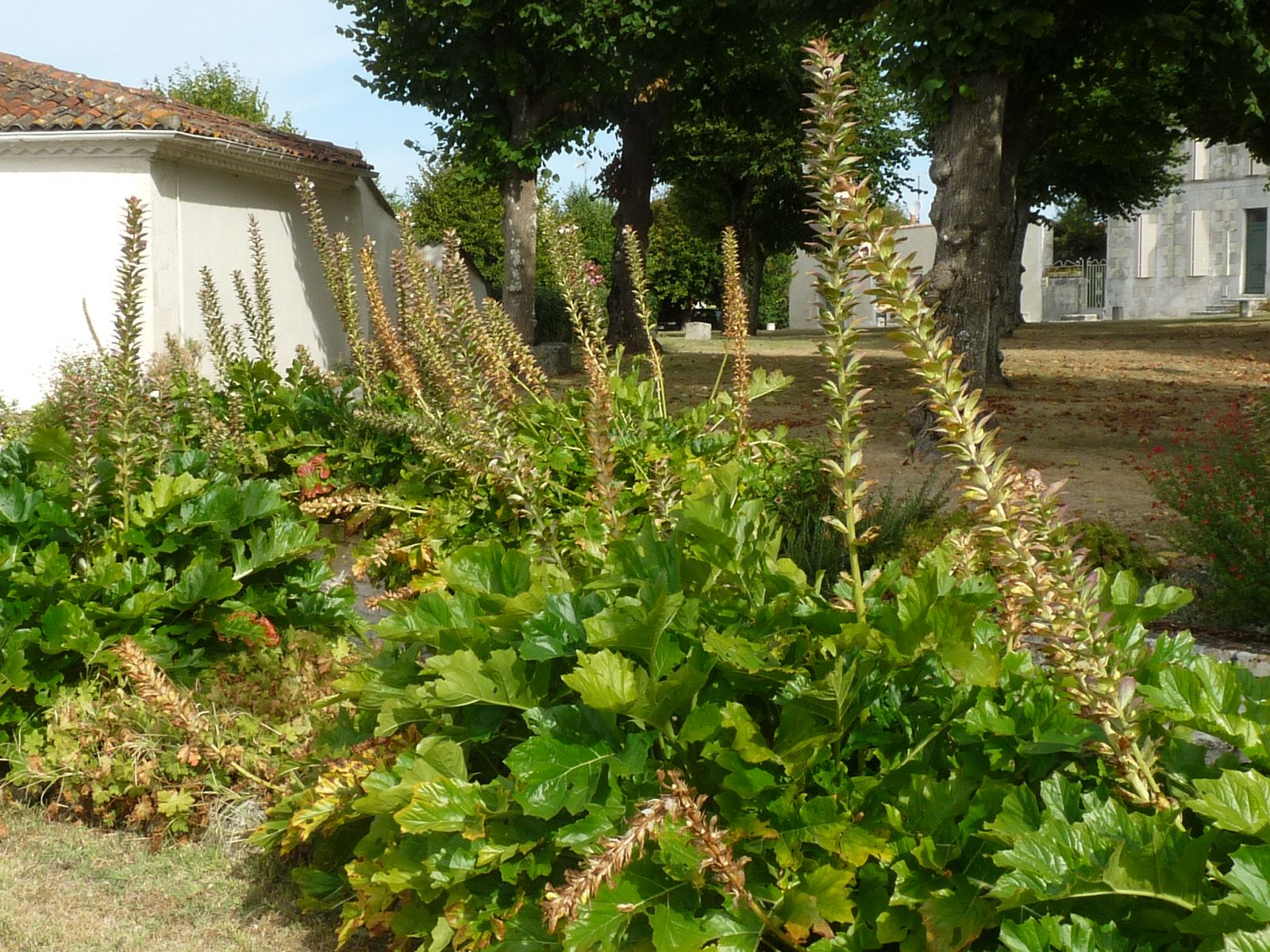
- Acanthus in Arces
- Location of Arces
- Location within France Location within Nouvelle-Aquitaine
- Coordinates: 45°33′14″N 0°51′30″W
- Country: France
- Region: Nouvelle-Aquitaine
- Department: Charente-Maritime
- Arrondissement: Saintes
- Canton: Saintonge Estuaire
- Intercommunality: CA Royan Atlantique

Government
  - Mayor (2020–2026): Joëlle Boulon
- Area^{1}: 21.74 km^{2} (8.39 sq mi)
- Highest elevation: 55 m (180 ft)
- Lowest elevation: 0 m (0 ft)
- Population (2023): 716
  - Density: 32.9/km^{2} (85.3/sq mi)
- Time zone: UTC+01:00 (CET)
  - Summer (DST): UTC+02:00 (CEST)
- INSEE/Postal code: 17015 /17120
- ^{1} French Land Register data, which excludes lakes, ponds, glaciers > 1 km^{2} (0.386 sq mi or 247 acres) and river estuaries.

Arces (French pronunciation: [aʁs]), commonly identified under the name Arces-sur-Gironde, is a commune in the Charente-Maritime department in southwestern France.

The small village is situated on the fringes of the côte de Beauté, closely connected with the nearby capital of the Royan hinterland canton, Cozes, which hosts the area's largest concentration of businesses and commerce.

The expansion of rural urbanization and the proximity of the commune to local tourist attractions, such as the bastide of Talmont-sur-Gironde, explains the recent development of the commune, with a population increase of 485 in 1990 to 622 in 2007. The commune is a part of the framework of the Communauté d'agglomération Royan Atlantique, with 72,136 inhabitants.

The village centre, with flowery alleys of roses, is concentrated around a small, prominent knoll with marshes and fields. The Romanesque Church of Saint Pierre, an ancient fixture on the Way of Saint James, is a dominant feature of the village.

== Geography ==
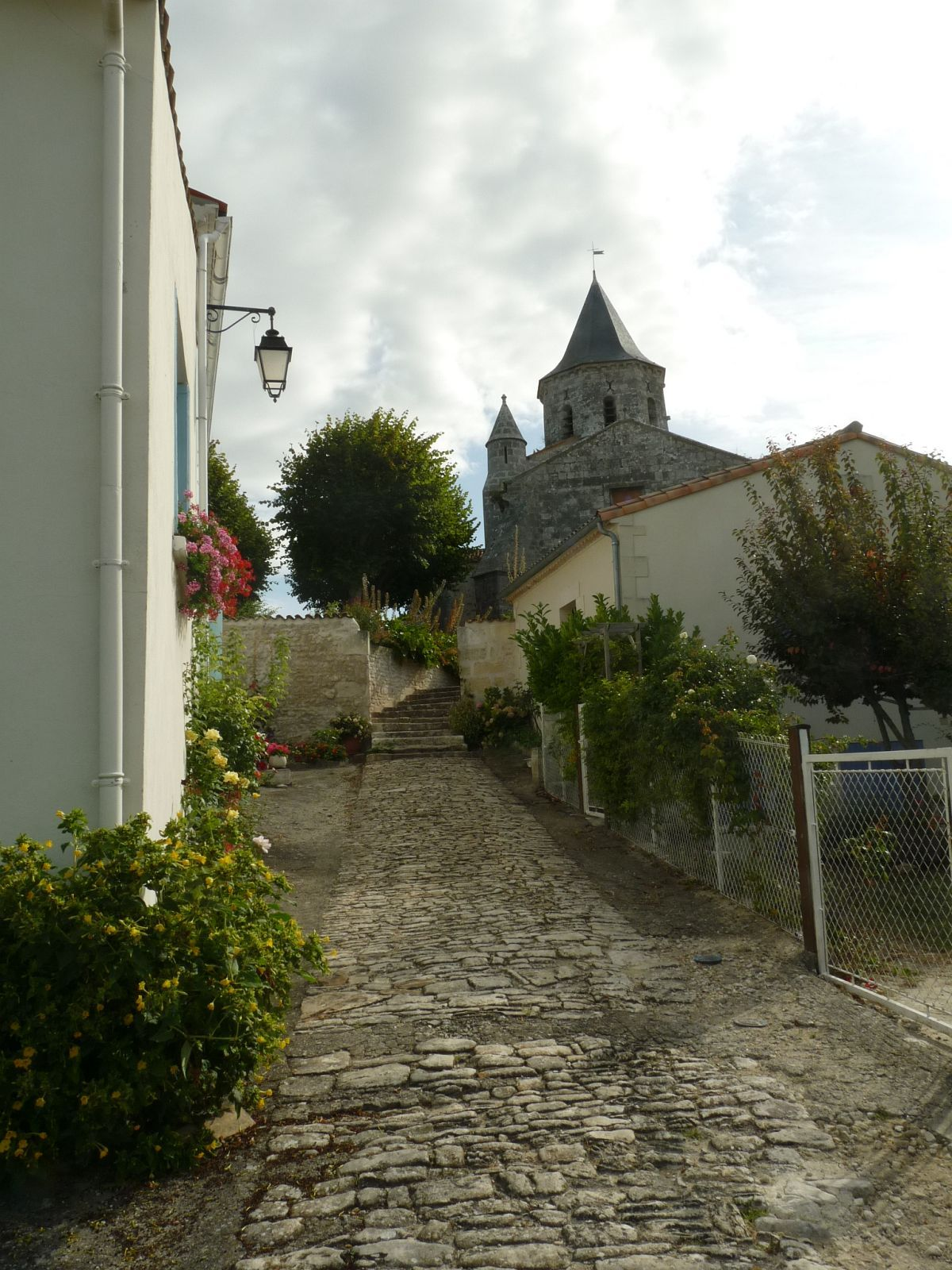
Village lane

=== Overview ===
The commune of Arces is situated in the southwest department of Charente-Maritime, along the côte de Beauté. A part of Southern France, or Le Midi, or more precisely along the mid-Atlantic. The commune belongs to two large geographic, French regions: the Great West (le Grand Ouest) and the Ground Southwest (le Grand Sud-Ouest).

Administratively, the commune belongs to the canton of Saintonge Estuaire and the arrondissement of Saintes. It is 4.0 kilometres south-west of Cozes, 7.3 kilometres east of Meschers-sur-Gironde, 12.3 kilometres south-east of Saint-Georges-de-Didonne, 14.2 kilometres south of Saujon, 15.3 kilometres south-east of Royan, 27.6 kilometres south-west of Saintes, 44 kilometres south of Rochefort, 71.1 kilometres south of La Rochelle, and 82.5 kilometres north of Bordeaux.

The commune is a stop on the Grand Randonnée, specifically GR 360.

Access to the commune is by the D114 road from Cozes in the north-east which passes through the commune and the village and continues to Barzan in the south. The D244 from Semussac in the north-west also passes through the village and continues to Épargnes in the south-east. The D114E9 also passes from the village south-west to Talmont-sur-Gironde. The D145 also passes through the commune near the coast. The commune is mostly farmland with small areas of forest.

=== Localities and hamlets ===
The population is generally centred around the town. The main hamlets are Liboulas, Brézillas, and Maine-Moutard. It is spread along the D244, which is also called the Route de l'Estuaire (Estuary Road). In the south of the commune, in the middle of marshlands, is a place called les Mottes Gachins.

=== Hydrography ===
In the west of the commune are the Barrails marshes which are dotted with many channels flowing to the Gironde estuary. The main ones are the Ruisseau de Bardécille, which marks the border with Semussac commune, and in the east the Desir, a stream which crosses the Lorivaux area.

=== Geology and terrain ===
Most of the commune is located on a rolling plateau formed of layers of limestone dating from the Cretaceous period. To the west the marsh consists of much more recent alluvium.

Part of the commune consists of a succession of hills overlooking the Gironde estuary, which dominate a vast prairie wetland that extends west to Talmont-sur-Gironde and Meschers-sur-Gironde.

The northwest of the commune retains some traces of the original forest that stretched to Chenac in Gallo-Roman times. These meagre woodlands lie north of the hamlet of Maine-Moutard and around the hamlet of Breuil.

The town itself is located at the foot of a limestone hill which supports the Romanesque church.

== Toponymy ==
The village takes its name from the Latin Arcis, which means a promontory or a fortified place. In 1170 it was shown under the name Villa de Arcis in the cartulary of Vaux, before becoming Arx during part of the Middle Ages.

== History ==
Although remains of cut and polished flint have been found in the commune which attest to human occupation from the Neolithic period, the village seems to have been founded in Roman times. It seems that the promontory overlooking the village was the location of a Roman camp (of which no trace has been found) situated on a Roman road which linked the Santones capital of Mediolanum Santonum (Saintes) to the port of Novioregum (Barzan), a few kilometres to the east. Only traces of this period, such as the remains of pottery, terra cotta, and amphoras, have been found in the surrounding fields.

In the 11th century Arces was a small village with a church dedicated to Saint Martin.

Between 1083 and 1091 Arnaud de Gammon from the House of Mortagne founded the Abbey of Vaux which gave him all the rights and privileges of the parish of Arces. The monks installed two priories in Arces: one near the church of Saint Martin and the second in the hamlet of Loriveau. Of the latter there remains a bridge built over the Désir stream. During this period the economy was based on cereals, grapes, the salt marshes along the Gironde, and timber. Arces became a stage on the Way of Saint James to Santiago de Compostela, as many pilgrims went to Talmont-sur-Gironde to cross the Gironde.

In 1151 Benoît de Mortagne invaded the village and attempted to monopolize the land and privileges of the priory of Saint-Martin. Threatened with excommunication, he was forced to retire and promise to respect the rights of the abbot. The parish depended for a long time two-thirds on the Barony of Cozes and the remaining third on the Lordship of Talmont. Conflicts between the lords and the villagers seem to have been commonplace.

In 1661 Mademoiselle d'Orleans, purchaser of the Barony of Cozes, required new Corvées or unpaid labour from the residents but was dismissed by the Parliament of Bordeaux. Several noble houses seem to have existed under the old regime: the Logis du Breuil, the Chateau of Theon, and that of Conteneuil are still visible.

In the 17th century the Dame de Theon became famous for her hatred of the Calvinists who she persecuted. This hatred was so strong than her lordship was besieged by the troops of Benjamin de Rohan, Duke of Soubise, one of the principal leaders of the Protestants, and whose brother was killed during the Siege of Royan (1622 or 1624). She seized the possessions and demolished the houses of Protestants who, reduced to poverty, went to bring the matter before the Duchess of La Trémoille. Having the right of justice, she condemned to death between 140 and 160 Protestants, some being broken on the wheel and the others hanged. After the Revolution the parish was converted into a commune.

The population in 1790 reached 1129 inhabitants but the rural exodus quickly brought the number to about 474 at the end of the Second World War. Since then the population grew to 561 inhabitants in 1999. The village is now involved in agricultural activities and promoting green tourism.

== Administration ==
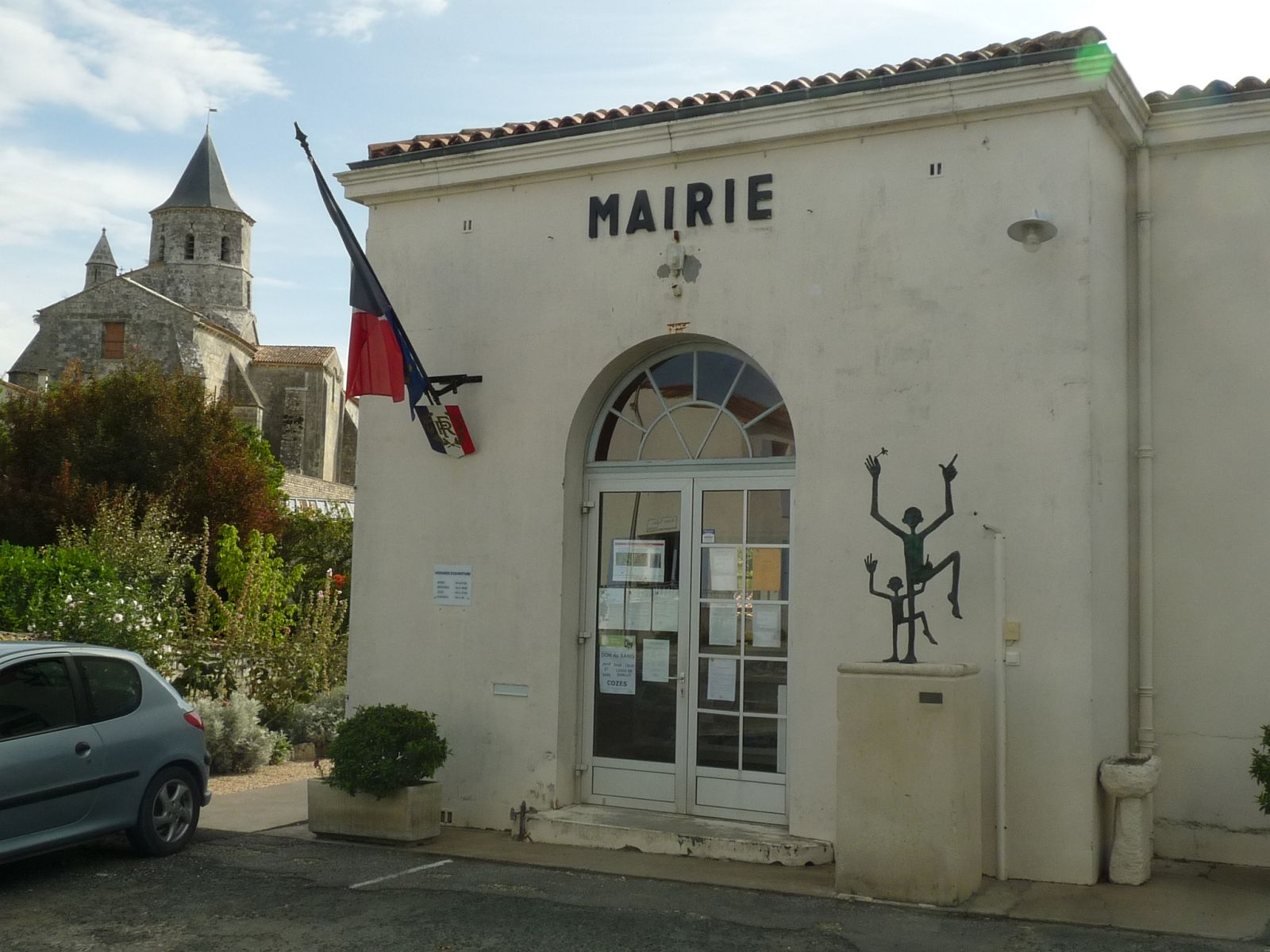
Arces Town Hall

List of successive mayors

From	To	Name
1965	1989	Michel Petit
2001	2014	Yves Pérochain
2014	2020	Jean-Paul Roy
2020	2026	Joëlle Boulon

== Demography ==
Its residents are referred to as Arcillons or Arcillonnes in French.

Historical population

Year	Pop.	±% p.a.
1793	1,025	—
1800	992	−0.47%
1806	1,066	+1.21%
1821	923	−0.96%
1831	1,117	+1.93%
1836	1,043	−1.36%
1841	1,019	−0.46%
1846	1,048	+0.56%
1851	1,045	−0.06%
1856	1,012	−0.64%
1861	927	−1.74%
1866	943	+0.34%
1872	832	−2.07%
1876	839	+0.21%
1881	779	−1.47%
1886	791	+0.31%
1891	731	−1.57%
1896	681	−1.41%
1901	673	−0.24%

Year	Pop.	±% p.a.
1906	671	−0.06%
1911	593	−2.44%
1921	539	−0.95%
1926	539	+0.00%
1931	555	+0.59%
1936	514	−1.52%
1946	474	−0.81%
1954	503	+0.75%
1962	511	+0.20%
1968	484	−0.90%
1975	423	−1.91%
1982	430	+0.23%
1990	485	+1.52%
1999	561	+1.63%
2007	622	+1.30%
2012	691	+2.13%
2017	753	+1.73%
2023	716	−0.84%

Source: EHESS and INSEE

== Economy ==
The town is in the heart of a particularly interesting labour pool for employment in the Royan area (resulting from the partition of the former maritime employment area of Saintonge which included many communes in the Rochefort, Marennes-Oléron, and Royan areas), consisting of 27,753 workers in 2008 The Royan employment zone is, together with that of La Rochelle, the most dynamic in the Poitou-Charentes region with both enjoying "an economic base and a dynamic demography" (INSEE). Growth is particularly strong due to the development of tertiary sector activities.

The economy of the commune is mainly based on agriculture (cultivation of cereals, vines, and livestock) which occupies about 2/3 of the active population. Tourism, which the municipality seeks to develop, complements the resources of the commune. The village has public services and some shops: a bakery, a caterer, and a hairdresser are located in the centre of town. Three campsites are located in the commune as well as two hotel rooms and one summer and winter rental accommodation.

== Culture and heritage ==
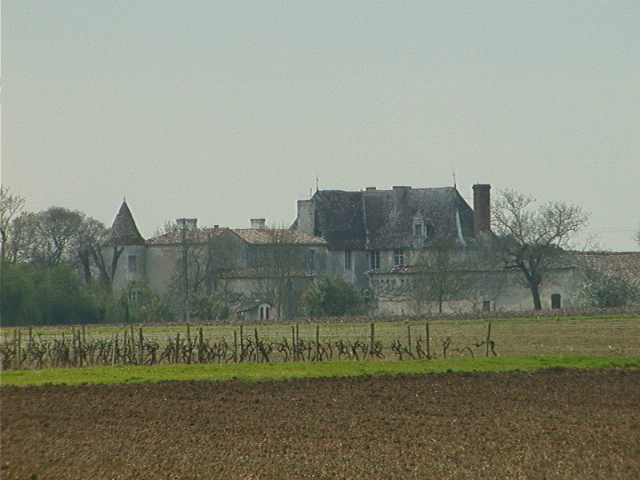
The Château of Théon

The Chateau of Theon dates from the 15th century and was the seat of a lordship whose boundaries once stretched as far as the territory of the present commune of Cozes. It is located at the northern extremity of the commune. In 1458 the lordship belonged to Jean du Breuil. In 1790 a descendant,'Anne-Marie du Breuil, brought her husband, Louis de Rigaud de Vaudreuil.

There are traces of a tunnel that connected the Chateau of Theon to Meschers passing through Arces.

During the French Revolution, the owner was burned in the fireplace of the salon.

One of the few covered wells in Charente-Maritime is visible in the courtyard of the castle.

=== Religious heritage ===
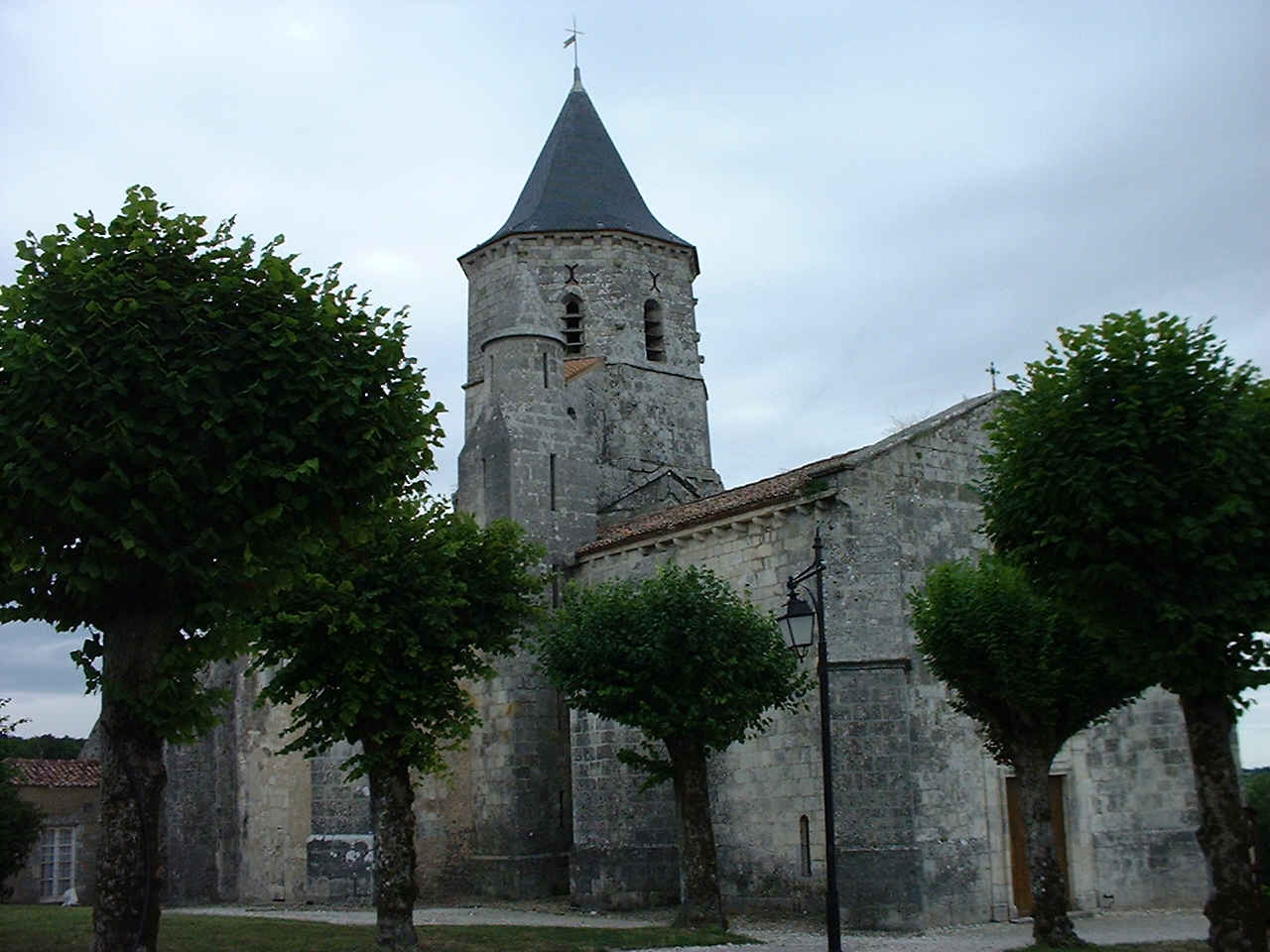
The Church of Saint Pierre

The Church of Saint Pierre (12th century) is registered as an historical monument. The church seems to date back at least to the 11th century. In 1086 it was given to the Abbey Saint-Étienne de Vaux. It was rebuilt in the 12th century. The three-sided apse, in Romanesque style, dates to that period and is the only vestige of the original building which was considerably altered during its history. Significant work took place from 1670 which altered the structure of the nave. The façade was built in 1703. It consists of a door with a broken triangular pediment topped with a rectangular bay window and framed by two massive buttresses.

The sanctuary consists of a nave with only two bays intersected by a transept extended by two Gothic stately chapels which replaced the Romanesque apses in the 14th century. The octagonal bell tower, surmounted by a slate spire, stands at the crossing of the transept. The decoration of the apse was completely redesigned in the 19th century: the frescoes, murals, and the painted sky on the ceiling date to this period.

The stained glass windows and statuary adorning the building also date from the same period. The retable, which is in the choir, was restored in 1994.

Located on a promontory overlooking the village, the church has a panoramic view of the hills, the Gironde estuary, and the coastline of the Médoc. It contains a chalice with paten (18th century) which are registered as an historical object.

Church picture gallery

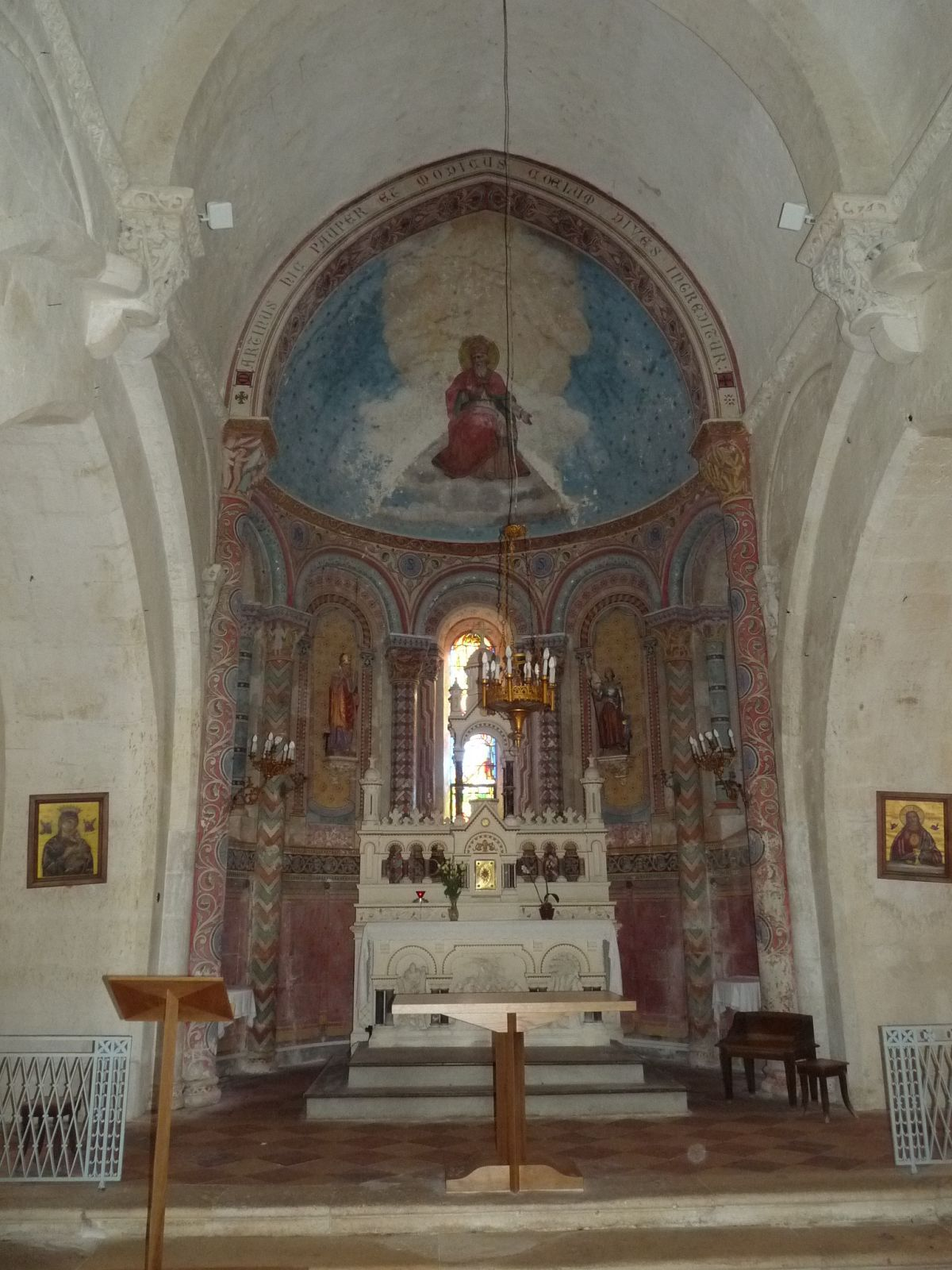
Interior of the church

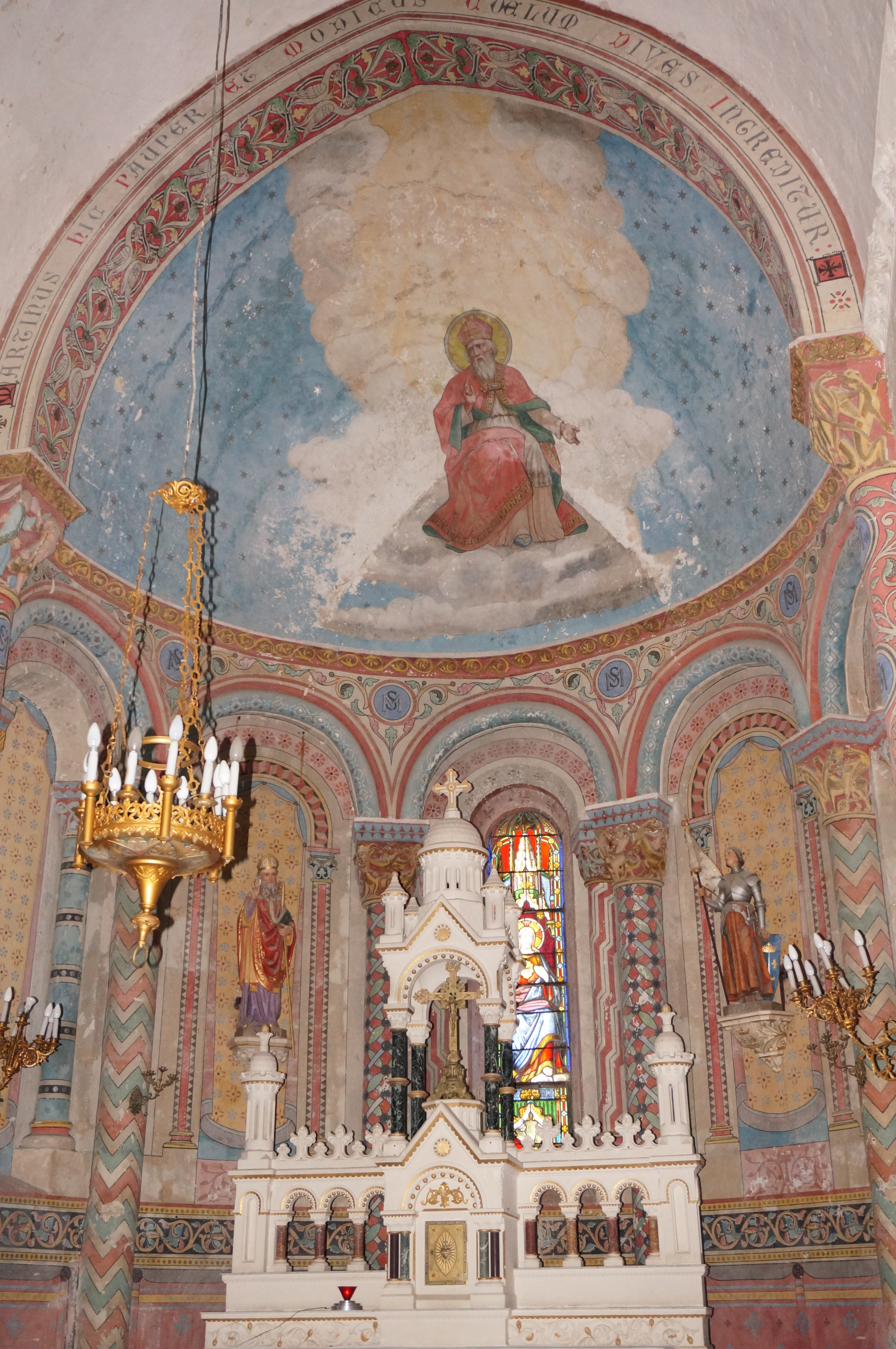
Altar and ceiling

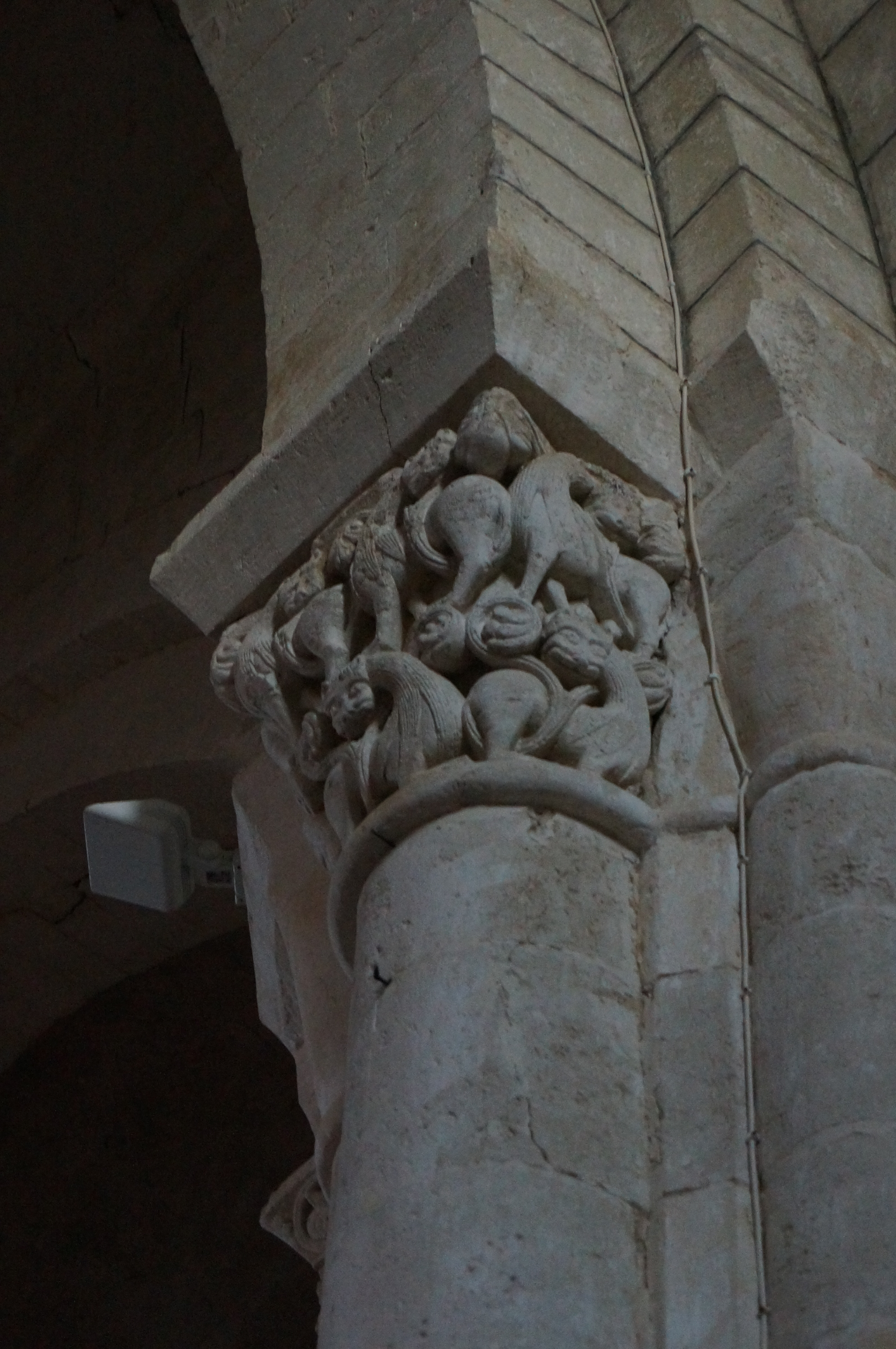
Capital

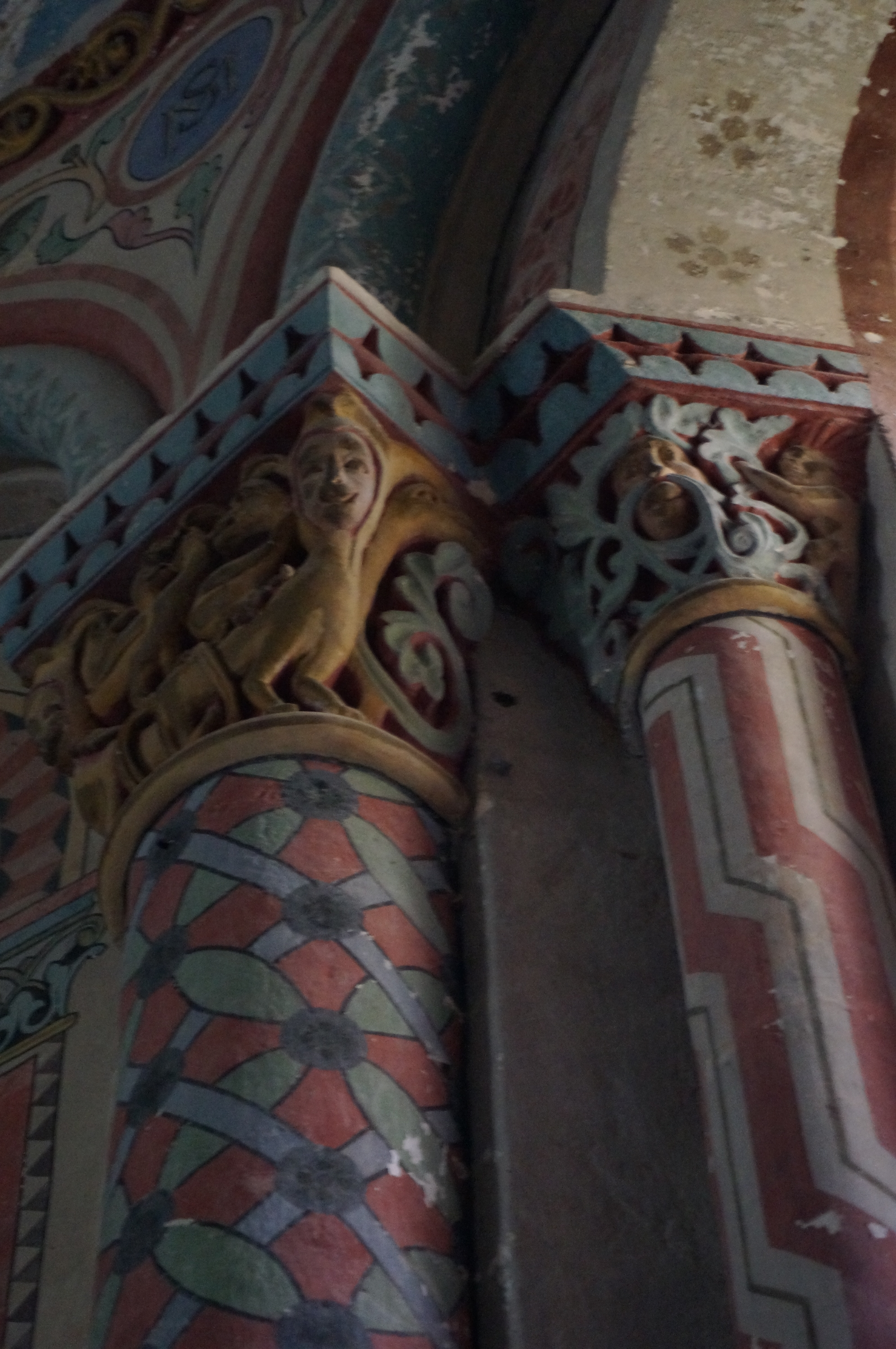

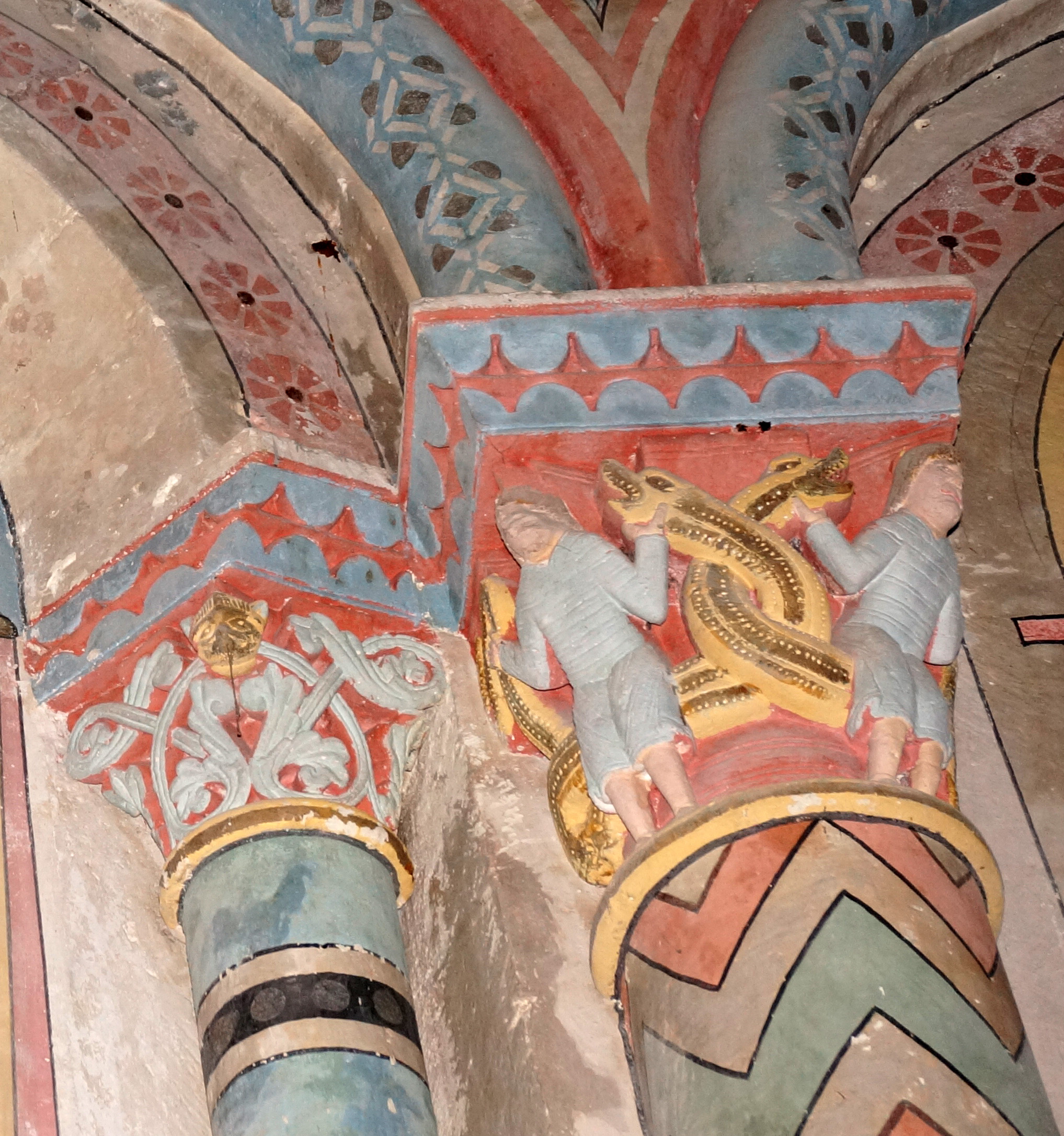

== See also ==
- Communes of the Charente-Maritime department

== Bibliography ==
- J.-F. Bascans, Histoire des Isle, tapuscrit, Paris, 1980.
