= Thaims =

- Commune
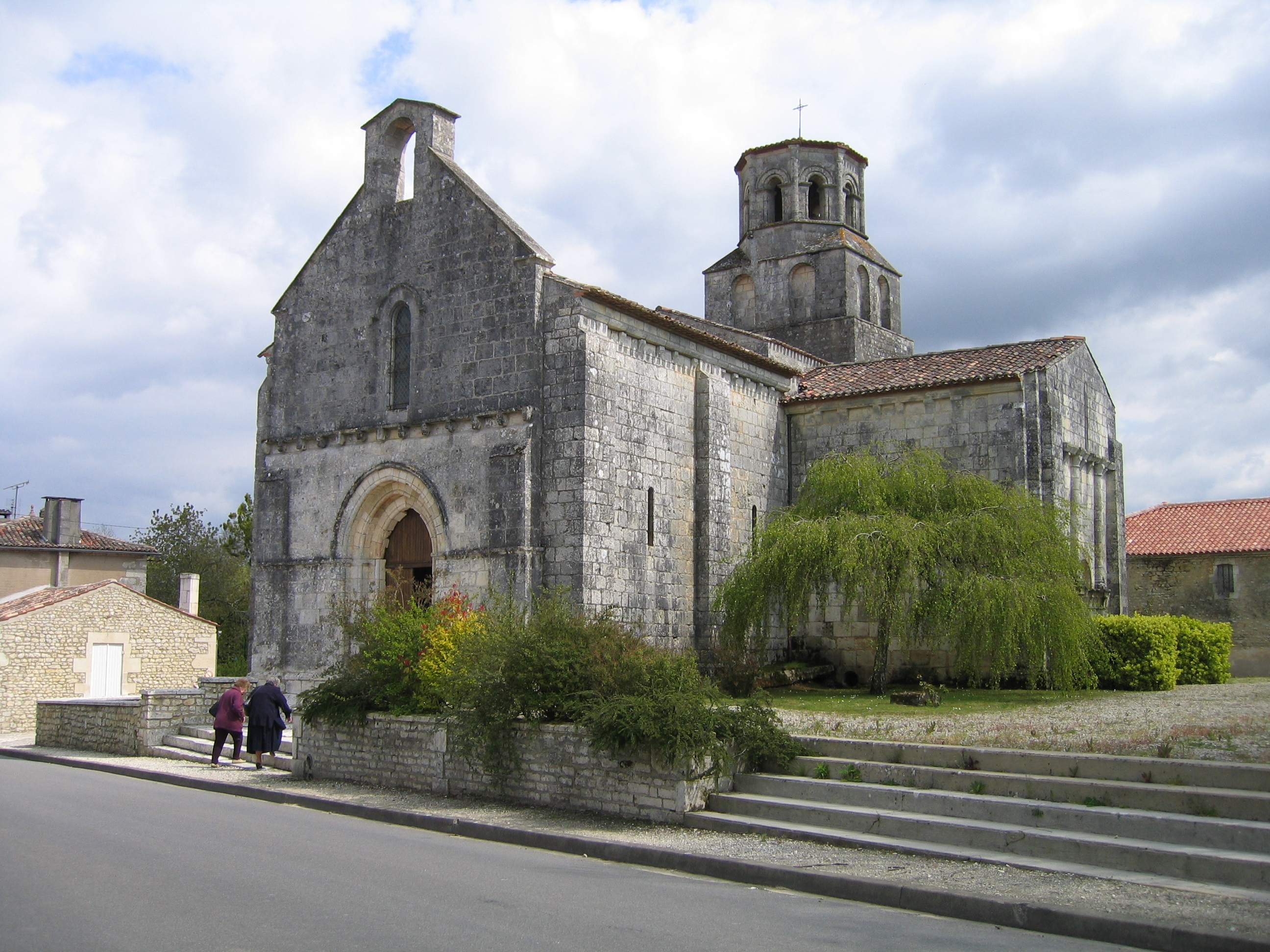
- The church in Thaims

- Coat of arms
- Location of Thaims
- Location within France Location within Nouvelle-Aquitaine
- Coordinates: 45°37′23″N 0°47′06″W
- Country: France
- Region: Nouvelle-Aquitaine
- Department: Charente-Maritime
- Arrondissement: Saintes
- Canton: Saintonge Estuaire
- Intercommunality: Gémozac et Saintonge Viticole

Government
  - Mayor (2020–2026): Bruno Tapon
- Area^{1}: 8.74 km^{2} (3.37 sq mi)
- Highest elevation: 31 m (102 ft)
- Lowest elevation: 13 m (43 ft)
- Population (2023): 396
  - Density: 45.3/km^{2} (117/sq mi)
- Time zone: UTC+01:00 (CET)
  - Summer (DST): UTC+02:00 (CEST)
- INSEE/Postal code: 17442 /17120
- ^{1} French Land Register data, which excludes lakes, ponds, glaciers > 1 km^{2} (0.386 sq mi or 247 acres) and river estuaries.

Thaims (French pronunciation: [tɛ̃]) is a commune in the Charente-Maritime department in southwestern France.

== Population ==
Historical population
Year	Pop.	±% p.a.
1968	311	—
1975	256	−2.74%
1982	229	−1.58%
1990	232	+0.16%
1999	239	+0.33%
2007	323	+3.84%
2012	375	+3.03%
2017	384	+0.48%
2023	396	+0.51%
Source: INSEE

== Heraldry ==
Thaims	Tierced in reversed pairle: 1st Or, a bunch of purple grapes, stalked tenné and leaved vert; 2nd Gules, three silver columns arranged fesswise and surmounted by a silver sword hilted or placed fesswise; 3rd Azure, three wavy silver bars and two gold keys, crossed in saltire and linked by a chain of the same.

== See also ==
- Communes of the Charente-Maritime department
