= Cravans =

- Commune
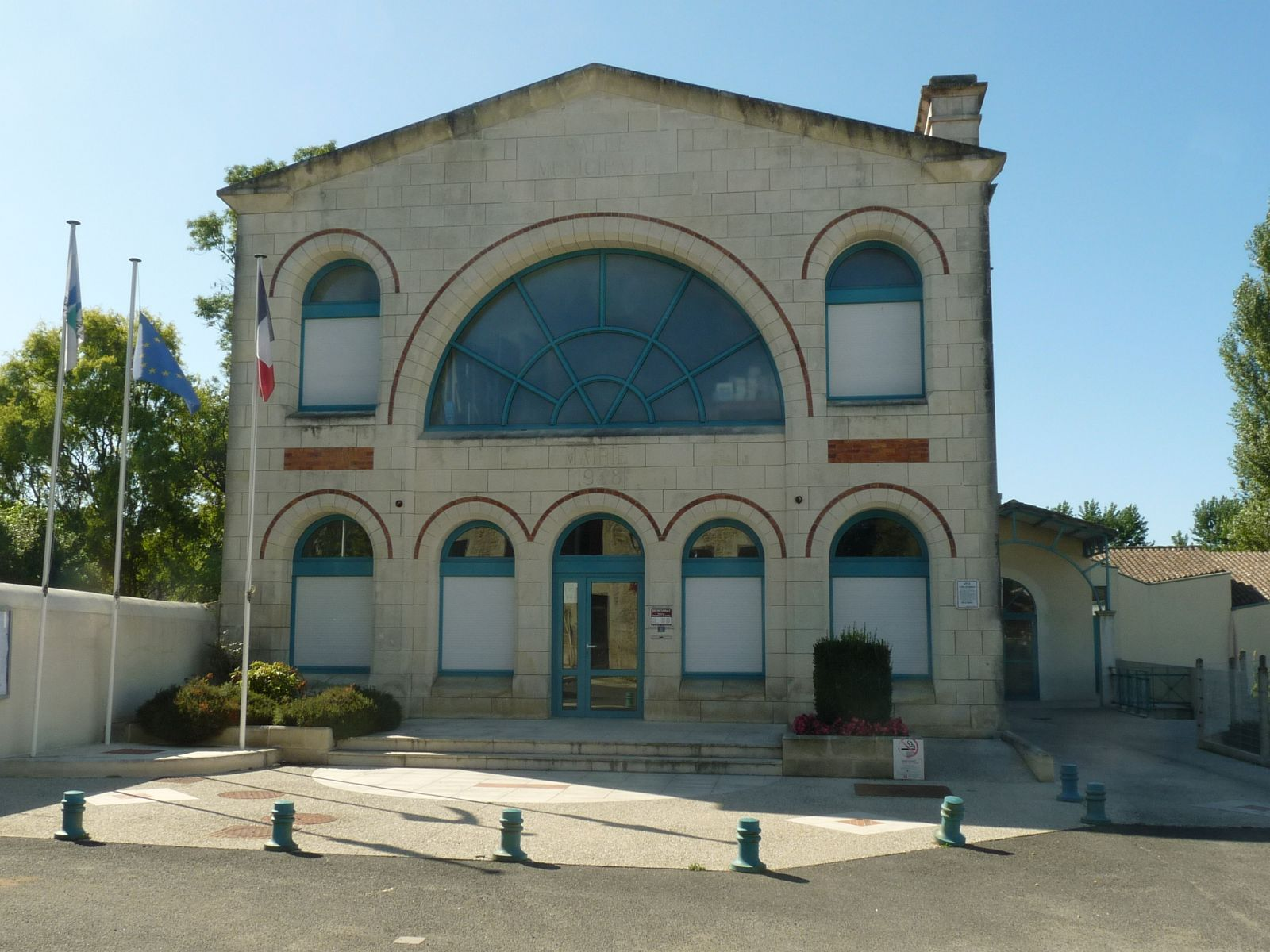
- Town hall

- Coat of arms
- Location of Cravans
- Location within France Location within Nouvelle-Aquitaine
- Coordinates: 45°35′49″N 0°42′35″W
- Country: France
- Region: Nouvelle-Aquitaine
- Department: Charente-Maritime
- Arrondissement: Saintes
- Canton: Saintonge Estuaire
- Intercommunality: Gémozac et de la Saintonge Viticole

Government
  - Mayor (2021–2026): Dominique Fradin
- Area^{1}: 14.72 km^{2} (5.68 sq mi)
- Elevation: 25 m (82 ft)
- Highest elevation: 53 m (174 ft)
- Lowest elevation: 17 m (56 ft)
- Population (2023): 845
  - Density: 57.4/km^{2} (149/sq mi)
- Time zone: UTC+01:00 (CET)
  - Summer (DST): UTC+02:00 (CEST)
- INSEE/Postal code: 17133 /17260
- ^{1} French Land Register data, which excludes lakes, ponds, glaciers > 1 km^{2} (0.386 sq mi or 247 acres) and river estuaries.

Cravans (French pronunciation: [kʁavɑ̃]) is a commune in the Charente-Maritime department in southwestern France.

== Population ==
Historical population
Year	Pop.	±% p.a.
1968	503	—
1975	509	+0.17%
1982	493	−0.46%
1990	526	+0.81%
1999	521	−0.11%
2007	686	+3.50%
2012	764	+2.18%
2017	872	+2.68%
2023	845	−0.52%
Source: INSEE

== See also ==
- Communes of the Charente-Maritime department
