= Villars-en-Pons =

- Commune
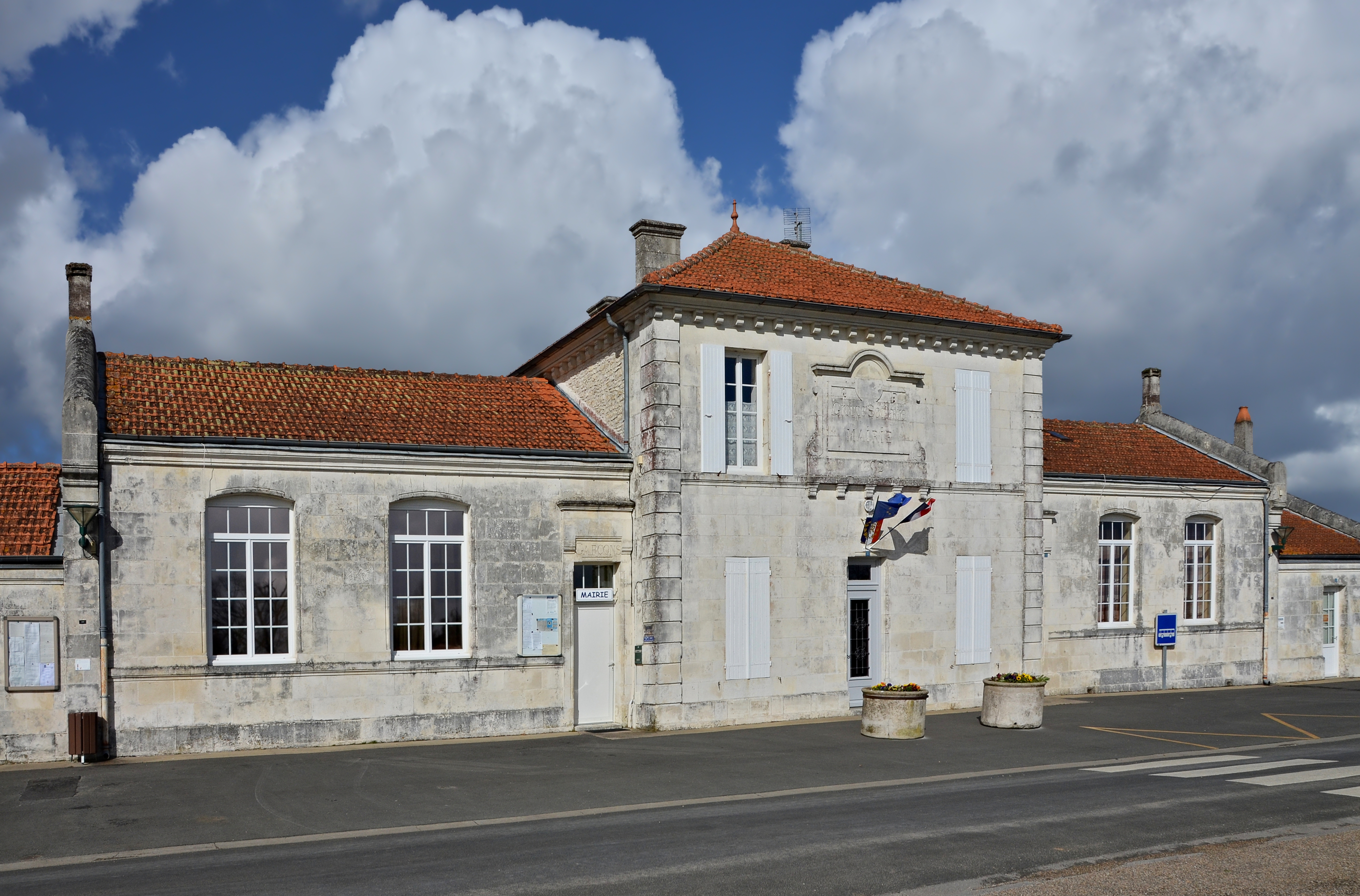
- The town hall in Villars-en-Pons
- Location of Villars-en-Pons
- Location within France Location within Nouvelle-Aquitaine
- Coordinates: 45°36′15″N 0°37′11″W
- Country: France
- Region: Nouvelle-Aquitaine
- Department: Charente-Maritime
- Arrondissement: Saintes
- Canton: Saintonge Estuaire
- Intercommunality: Gémozac et Saintonge Viticole

Government
  - Mayor (2020–2026): Patrick Maxime
- Area^{1}: 13.32 km^{2} (5.14 sq mi)
- Highest elevation: 57 m (187 ft)
- Lowest elevation: 23 m (75 ft)
- Population (2023): 583
  - Density: 43.8/km^{2} (113/sq mi)
- Time zone: UTC+01:00 (CET)
  - Summer (DST): UTC+02:00 (CEST)
- INSEE/Postal code: 17469 /17260
- ^{1} French Land Register data, which excludes lakes, ponds, glaciers > 1 km^{2} (0.386 sq mi or 247 acres) and river estuaries.

Villars-en-Pons (French pronunciation: [vilaʁ ɑ̃ pɔ̃]) is a commune in the Charente-Maritime department in southwestern France.

== Population ==
Historical population
Year	Pop.	±% p.a.
1968	451	—
1975	421	−0.98%
1982	391	−1.05%
1990	387	−0.13%
1999	451	+1.72%
2007	563	+2.81%
2012	557	−0.21%
2017	566	+0.32%
2023	583	+0.49%
Source: INSEE

== See also ==
- Communes of the Charente-Maritime department
