= Montpellier-de-Médillan =

- Commune
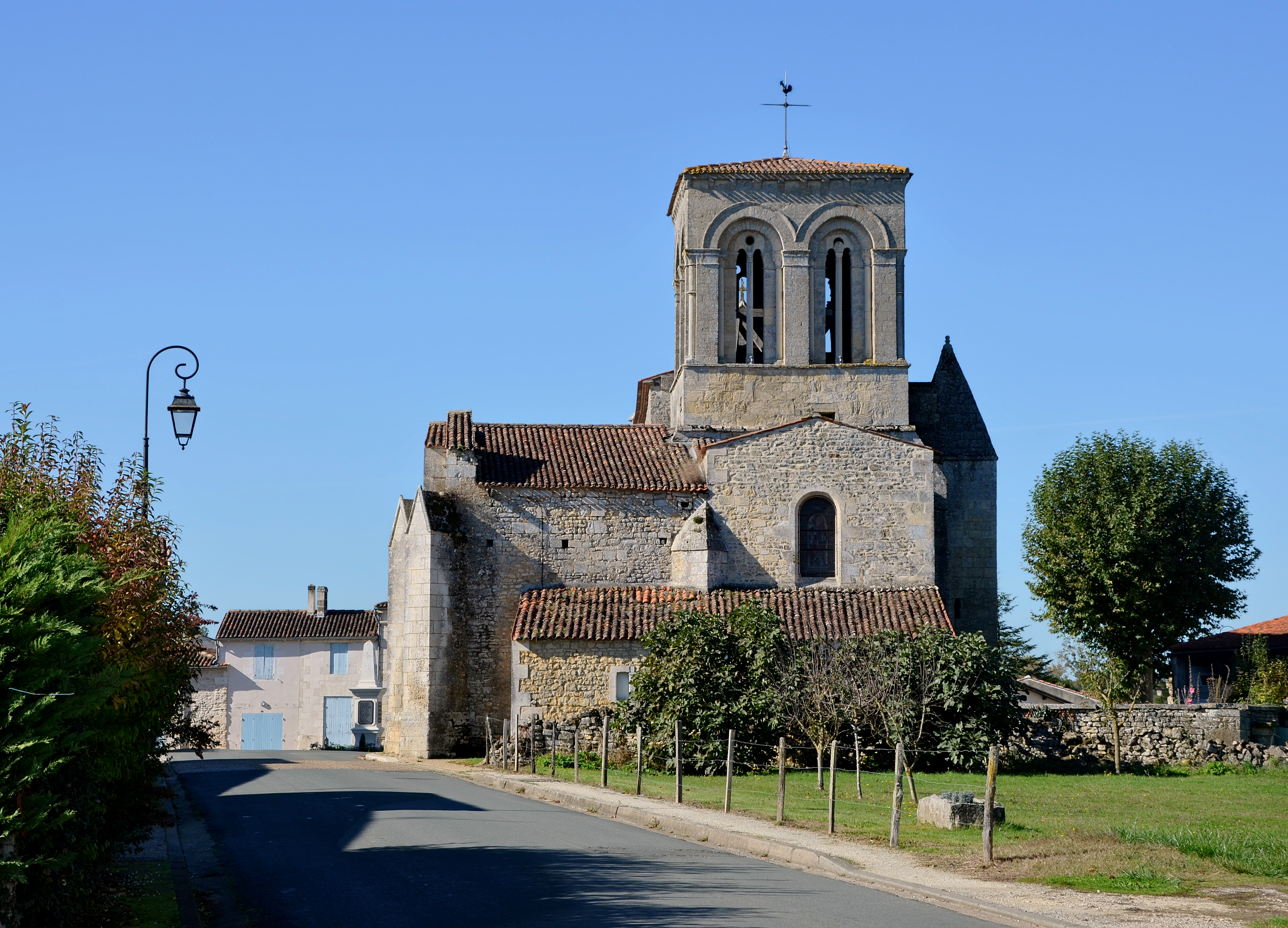
- The church in Montpellier-de-Médillan
- Location of Montpellier-de-Médillan
- Location within France Location within Nouvelle-Aquitaine
- Coordinates: 45°38′08″N 0°44′35″W
- Country: France
- Region: Nouvelle-Aquitaine
- Department: Charente-Maritime
- Arrondissement: Saintes
- Canton: Saintonge Estuaire
- Intercommunality: Gémozac et Saintonge Viticole

Government
  - Mayor (2020–2026): Thierry Georgeon
- Area^{1}: 14.85 km^{2} (5.73 sq mi)
- Highest elevation: 42 m (138 ft)
- Lowest elevation: 16 m (52 ft)
- Population (2023): 700
  - Density: 47/km^{2} (120/sq mi)
- Time zone: UTC+01:00 (CET)
  - Summer (DST): UTC+02:00 (CEST)
- INSEE/Postal code: 17244 /17260
- ^{1} French Land Register data, which excludes lakes, ponds, glaciers > 1 km^{2} (0.386 sq mi or 247 acres) and river estuaries.

Montpellier-de-Médillan (French pronunciation: [mɔ̃pəlje də medijɑ̃]) is a commune in the Charente-Maritime department in southwestern France.

== Population ==
Historical population
Year	Pop.	±% p.a.
1968	539	—
1975	512	−0.73%
1982	513	+0.03%
1990	502	−0.27%
1999	506	+0.09%
2007	625	+2.68%
2012	637	+0.38%
2017	682	+1.37%
2023	700	+0.44%
Source: INSEE

== See also ==
- Communes of the Charente-Maritime department
