= Meursac =

- Commune
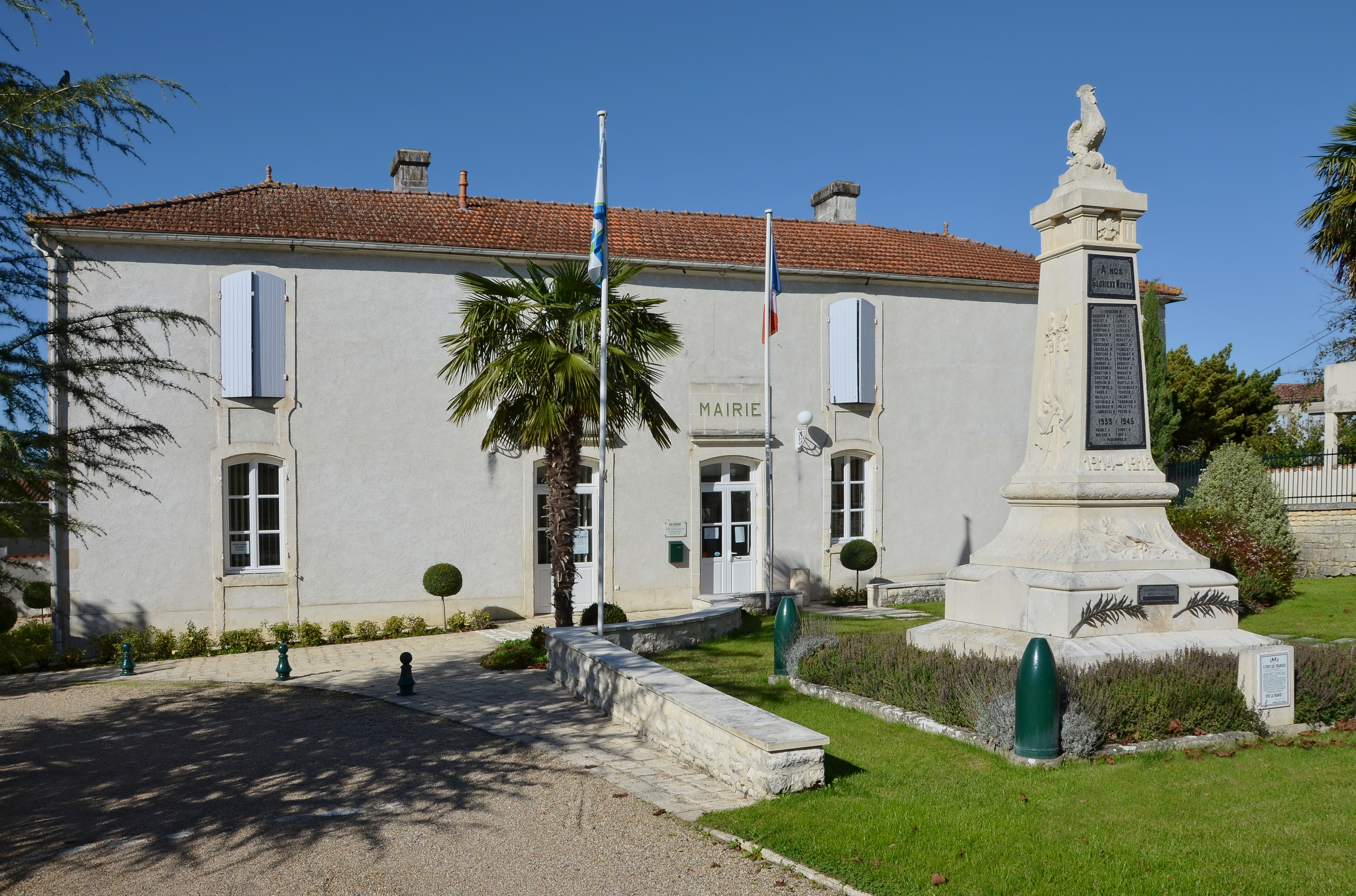
- The town hall in Meursac
- Location of Meursac
- Location within France Location within Nouvelle-Aquitaine
- Coordinates: 45°39′00″N 0°48′28″W
- Country: France
- Region: Nouvelle-Aquitaine
- Department: Charente-Maritime
- Arrondissement: Saintes
- Canton: Saintonge Estuaire
- Intercommunality: Gémozac et Saintonge Viticole

Government
  - Mayor (2020–2026): Jean-Michel Chatelier
- Area^{1}: 26.17 km^{2} (10.10 sq mi)
- Highest elevation: 41 m (135 ft)
- Lowest elevation: 7 m (23 ft)
- Population (2023): 1,563
  - Density: 59.72/km^{2} (154.7/sq mi)
- Time zone: UTC+01:00 (CET)
  - Summer (DST): UTC+02:00 (CEST)
- INSEE/Postal code: 17232 /17120
- ^{1} French Land Register data, which excludes lakes, ponds, glaciers > 1 km^{2} (0.386 sq mi or 247 acres) and river estuaries.

Meursac (French pronunciation: [mœʁsak]) is a commune in the Charente-Maritime department in southwestern France.

== Population ==
Historical population
Year	Pop.	±% p.a.
1968	975	—
1975	916	−0.89%
1982	909	−0.11%
1990	922	+0.18%
1999	1,006	+0.97%
2007	1,184	+2.06%
2012	1,429	+3.83%
2017	1,489	+0.83%
2023	1,563	+0.81%
Source: INSEE

== See also ==
- Communes of the Charente-Maritime department
