= Tanzac =

- Commune
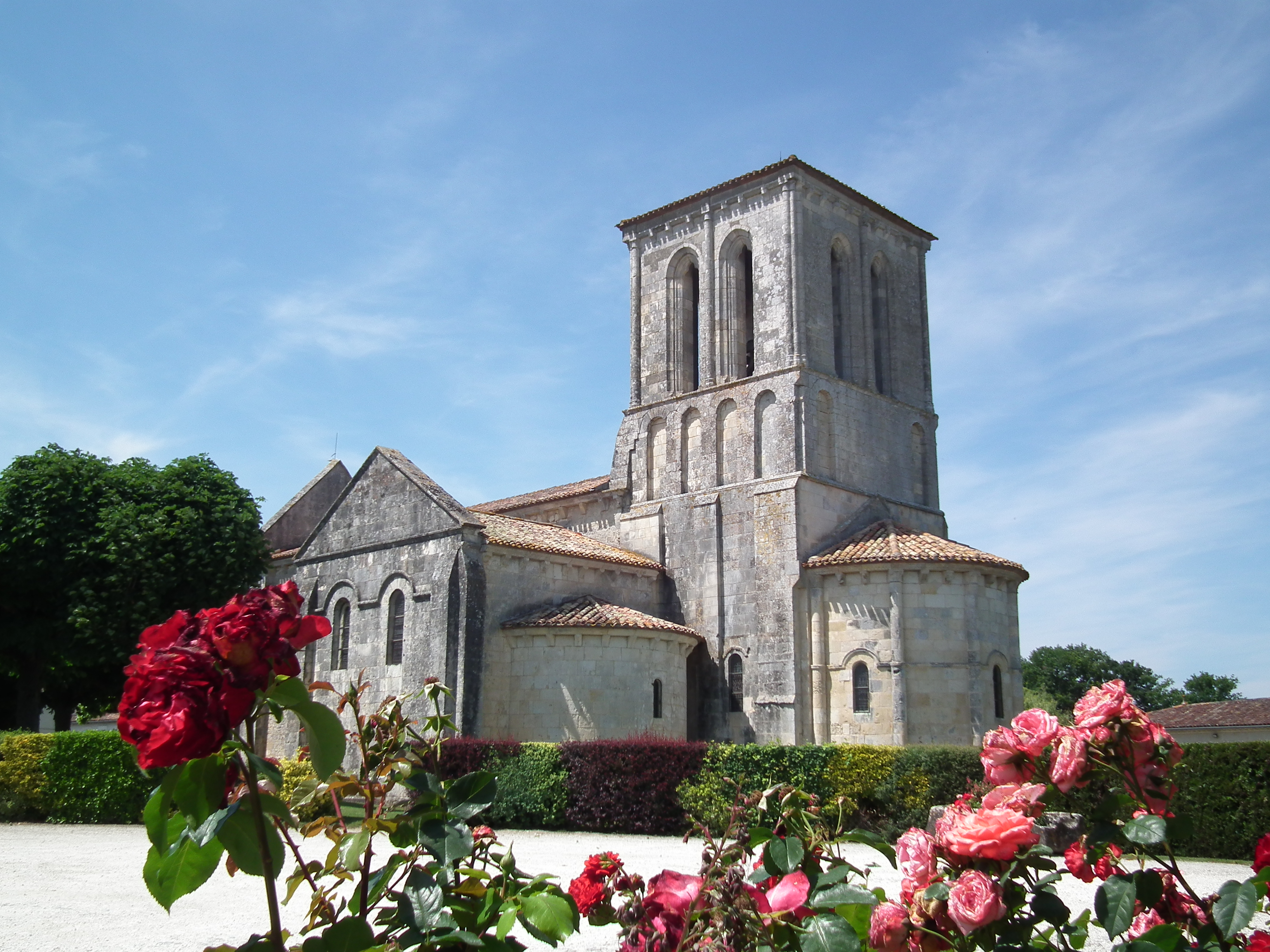
- The church in Tanzac
- Location of Tanzac
- Location within France Location within Nouvelle-Aquitaine
- Coordinates: 45°33′54″N 0°37′36″W
- Country: France
- Region: Nouvelle-Aquitaine
- Department: Charente-Maritime
- Arrondissement: Saintes
- Canton: Saintonge Estuaire
- Intercommunality: Gémozac et Saintonge Viticole

Government
  - Mayor (2020–2026): Cyril Arrivé
- Area^{1}: 11.23 km^{2} (4.34 sq mi)
- Highest elevation: 51 m (167 ft)
- Lowest elevation: 27 m (89 ft)
- Population (2023): 296
  - Density: 26.4/km^{2} (68.3/sq mi)
- Time zone: UTC+01:00 (CET)
  - Summer (DST): UTC+02:00 (CEST)
- INSEE/Postal code: 17438 /17260
- ^{1} French Land Register data, which excludes lakes, ponds, glaciers > 1 km^{2} (0.386 sq mi or 247 acres) and river estuaries.

Tanzac (French pronunciation: [tɑ̃zak]) is a commune in the Charente-Maritime department in southwestern France.

== Population ==
Historical population
Year	Pop.	±% p.a.
1968	288	—
1975	262	−1.34%
1982	248	−0.78%
1990	230	−0.94%
1999	251	+0.98%
2007	270	+0.92%
2012	311	+2.87%
2017	312	+0.06%
2023	296	−0.87%
Source: INSEE

== See also ==
- Communes of the Charente-Maritime department
