= Saint-Simon-de-Pellouaille =

- Commune
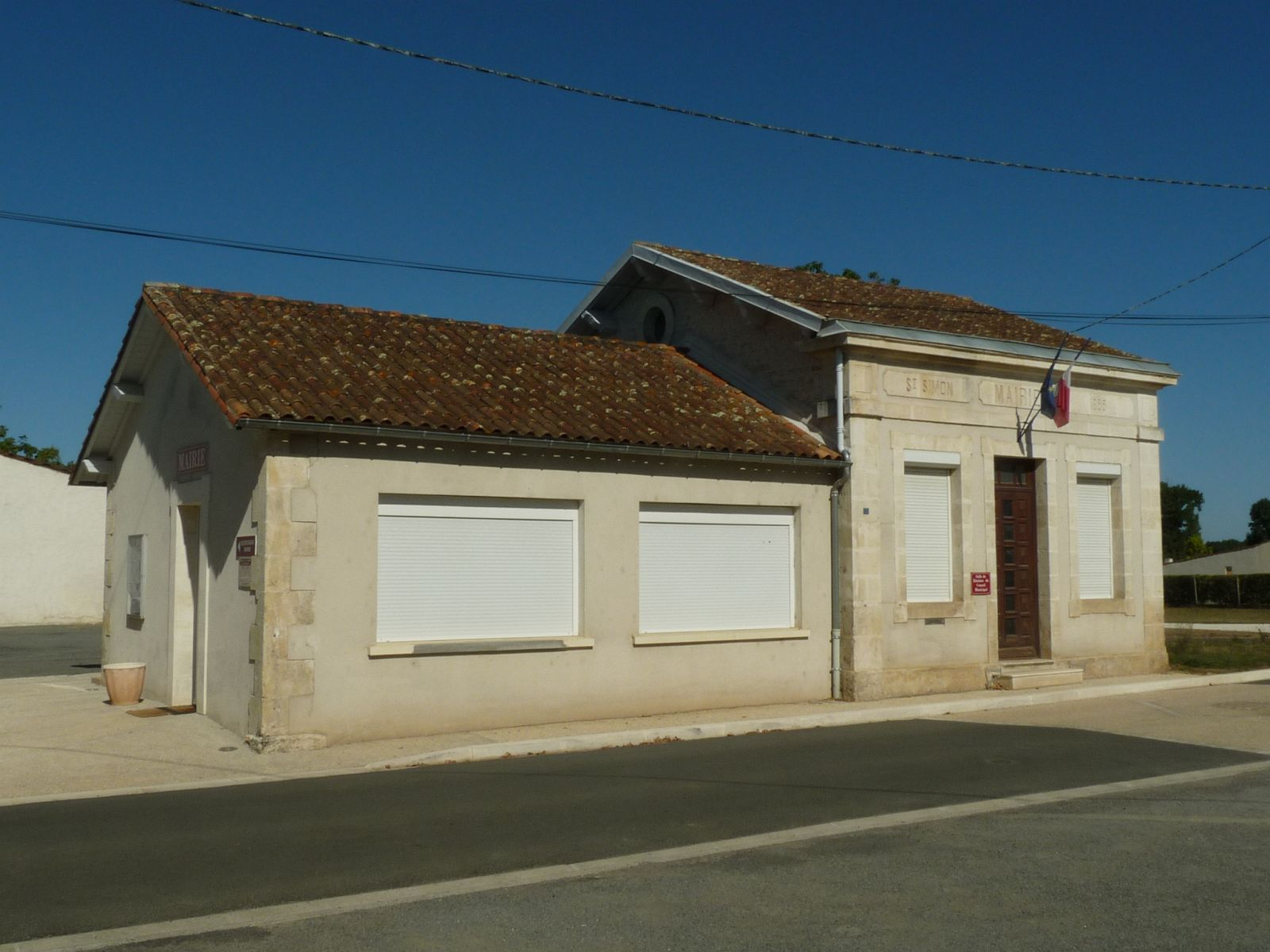
- Town hall
- Location of Saint-Simon-de-Pellouaille
- Location within France Location within Nouvelle-Aquitaine
- Coordinates: 45°36′50″N 0°41′44″W
- Country: France
- Region: Nouvelle-Aquitaine
- Department: Charente-Maritime
- Arrondissement: Saintes
- Canton: Saintonge Estuaire
- Intercommunality: Gémozac et la Saintonge Viticole

Government
  - Mayor (2020–2026): Aurelien Berthelot
- Area^{1}: 8.95 km^{2} (3.46 sq mi)
- Elevation: 41 m (135 ft)
- Highest elevation: 49 m (161 ft)
- Lowest elevation: 34 m (112 ft)
- Population (2023): 708
  - Density: 79.1/km^{2} (205/sq mi)
- Time zone: UTC+01:00 (CET)
  - Summer (DST): UTC+02:00 (CEST)
- INSEE/Postal code: 17404 /17260
- ^{1} French Land Register data, which excludes lakes, ponds, glaciers > 1 km^{2} (0.386 sq mi or 247 acres) and river estuaries.

Saint-Simon-de-Pellouaille (French pronunciation: [sɛ̃ simɔ̃ də pɛlwaj]) is a commune in the Charente-Maritime department in southwestern France.

== Population ==
Historical population
Year	Pop.	±% p.a.
1968	315	—
1975	283	−1.52%
1982	308	+1.22%
1990	309	+0.04%
1999	370	+2.02%
2007	498	+3.78%
2012	595	+3.62%
2017	654	+1.91%
2023	708	+1.33%
Source: INSEE

== See also ==
- Communes of the Charente-Maritime department
