= Canton of Saintonge Estuaire =

Coordinates: 45.56°N 0.95°W

The canton of Saintonge Estuaire is an administrative division of the Charente-Maritime department, western France. It was created at the French canton reorganisation which came into effect in March 2015. Its seat is in Meschers-sur-Gironde.

It consists of the following communes:

1. Arces
2. Barzan
3. Boutenac-Touvent
4. Brie-sous-Mortagne
5. Chenac-Saint-Seurin-d'Uzet
6. Cozes
7. Cravans
8. Épargnes
9. Floirac
10. Gémozac
11. Grézac
12. Jazennes
13. Meschers-sur-Gironde
14. Meursac
15. Montpellier-de-Médillan
16. Mortagne-sur-Gironde
17. Saint-André-de-Lidon
18. Saint-Simon-de-Pellouaille
19. Talmont-sur-Gironde
20. Tanzac
21. Thaims
22. Villars-en-Pons
23. Virollet
