= Chenac-Saint-Seurin-d'Uzet =

- Commune
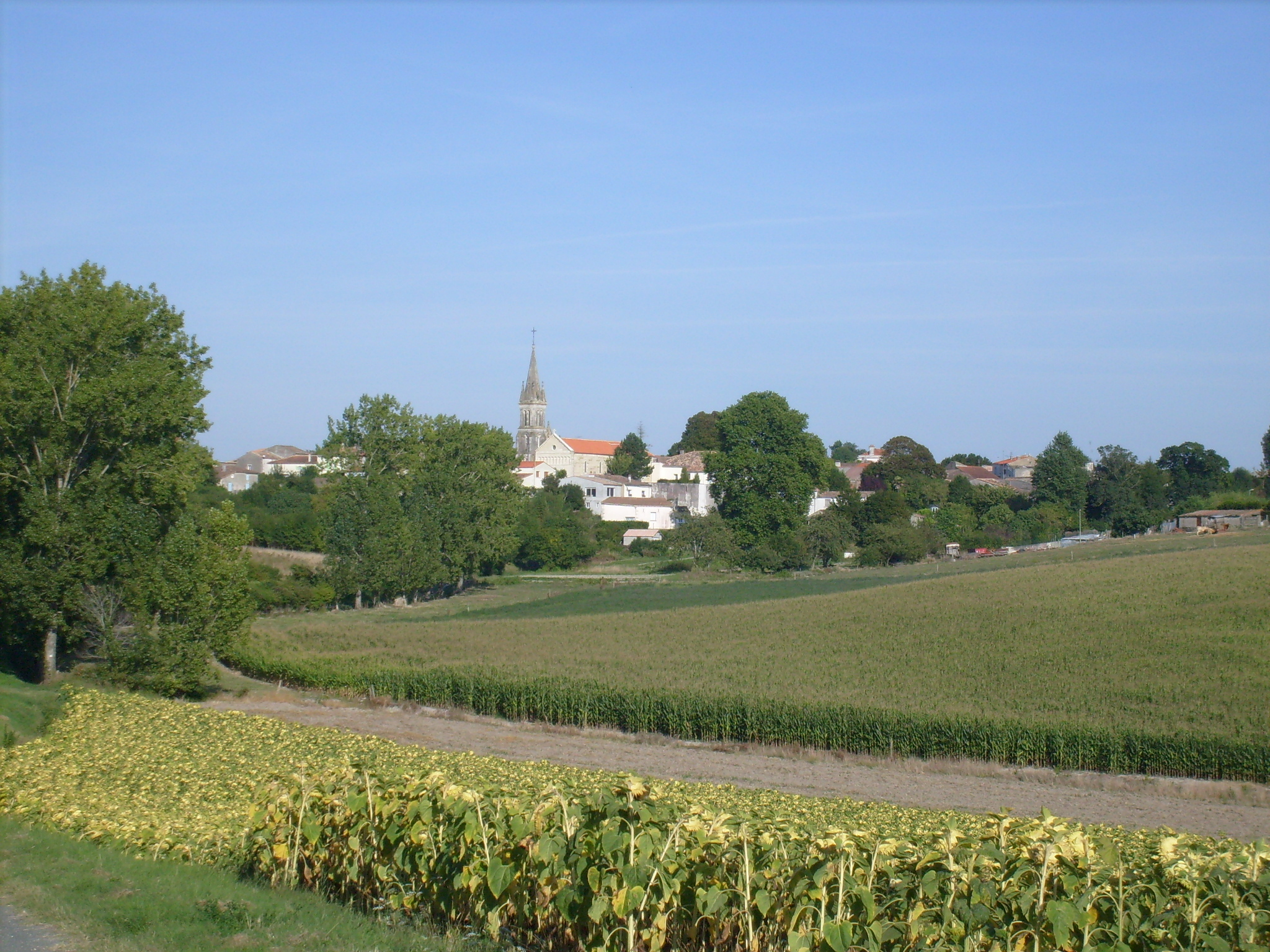
- A general view of Chenac-Saint-Seurin-d'Uzet

- Coat of arms
- Location of Chenac-Saint-Seurin-d'Uzet
- Location within France Location within Nouvelle-Aquitaine
- Coordinates: 45°31′02″N 0°49′34″W
- Country: France
- Region: Nouvelle-Aquitaine
- Department: Charente-Maritime
- Arrondissement: Saintes
- Canton: Saintonge Estuaire
- Intercommunality: CA Royan Atlantique

Government
  - Mayor (2020–2026): Bruno Dujean
- Area^{1}: 20.23 km^{2} (7.81 sq mi)
- Highest elevation: 62 m (203 ft)
- Lowest elevation: 0 m (0 ft)
- Population (2023): 606
  - Density: 30.0/km^{2} (77.6/sq mi)
- Time zone: UTC+01:00 (CET)
  - Summer (DST): UTC+02:00 (CEST)
- INSEE/Postal code: 17098 /17120
- ^{1} French Land Register data, which excludes lakes, ponds, glaciers > 1 km^{2} (0.386 sq mi or 247 acres) and river estuaries.

Chenac-Saint-Seurin-d'Uzet (French pronunciation: [ʃənak sɛ̃ sœʁɛ̃ dyzɛ]) is a commune in the Charente-Maritime department in southwestern France.

== Population ==
Historical population
Year	Pop.	±% p.a.
1968	795	—
1975	721	−1.39%
1982	667	−1.11%
1990	599	−1.34%
1999	572	−0.51%
2007	593	+0.45%
2012	592	−0.03%
2017	594	+0.07%
2023	606	+0.33%
Source: INSEE

== See also ==
- Communes of the Charente-Maritime department
