= Jazennes =

- Commune
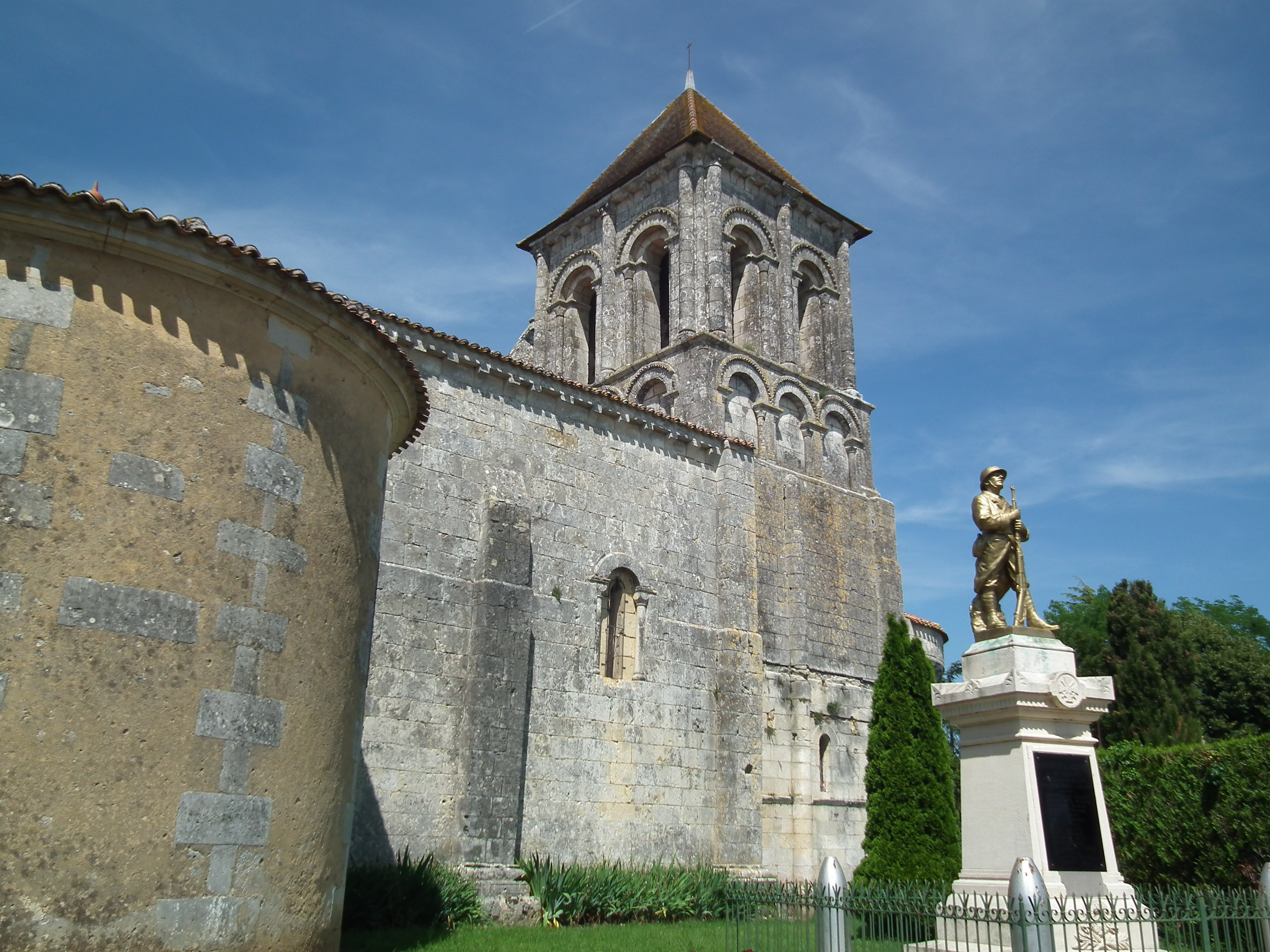
- The church in Jazennes

- Coat of arms
- Location of Jazennes
- Location within France Location within Nouvelle-Aquitaine
- Coordinates: 45°34′59″N 0°36′56″W
- Country: France
- Region: Nouvelle-Aquitaine
- Department: Charente-Maritime
- Arrondissement: Saintes
- Canton: Saintonge Estuaire
- Intercommunality: Gémozac et Saintonge Viticole

Government
  - Mayor (2020–2026): Stéphanie Valeri
- Area^{1}: 10.84 km^{2} (4.19 sq mi)
- Highest elevation: 52 m (171 ft)
- Lowest elevation: 22 m (72 ft)
- Population (2023): 542
  - Density: 50.0/km^{2} (129/sq mi)
- Time zone: UTC+01:00 (CET)
  - Summer (DST): UTC+02:00 (CEST)
- INSEE/Postal code: 17196 /17460
- ^{1} French Land Register data, which excludes lakes, ponds, glaciers > 1 km^{2} (0.386 sq mi or 247 acres) and river estuaries.

Jazennes (French pronunciation: [ʒazɛn]) is a commune in the Charente-Maritime department in southwestern France.

== Population ==
Historical population
Year	Pop.	±% p.a.
1968	372	—
1975	335	−1.49%
1982	349	+0.59%
1990	367	+0.63%
1999	367	+0.00%
2007	475	+3.28%
2012	497	+0.91%
2017	532	+1.37%
2023	542	+0.31%
Source: INSEE

== See also ==
- Communes of the Charente-Maritime department
