= Épargnes =

- Commune
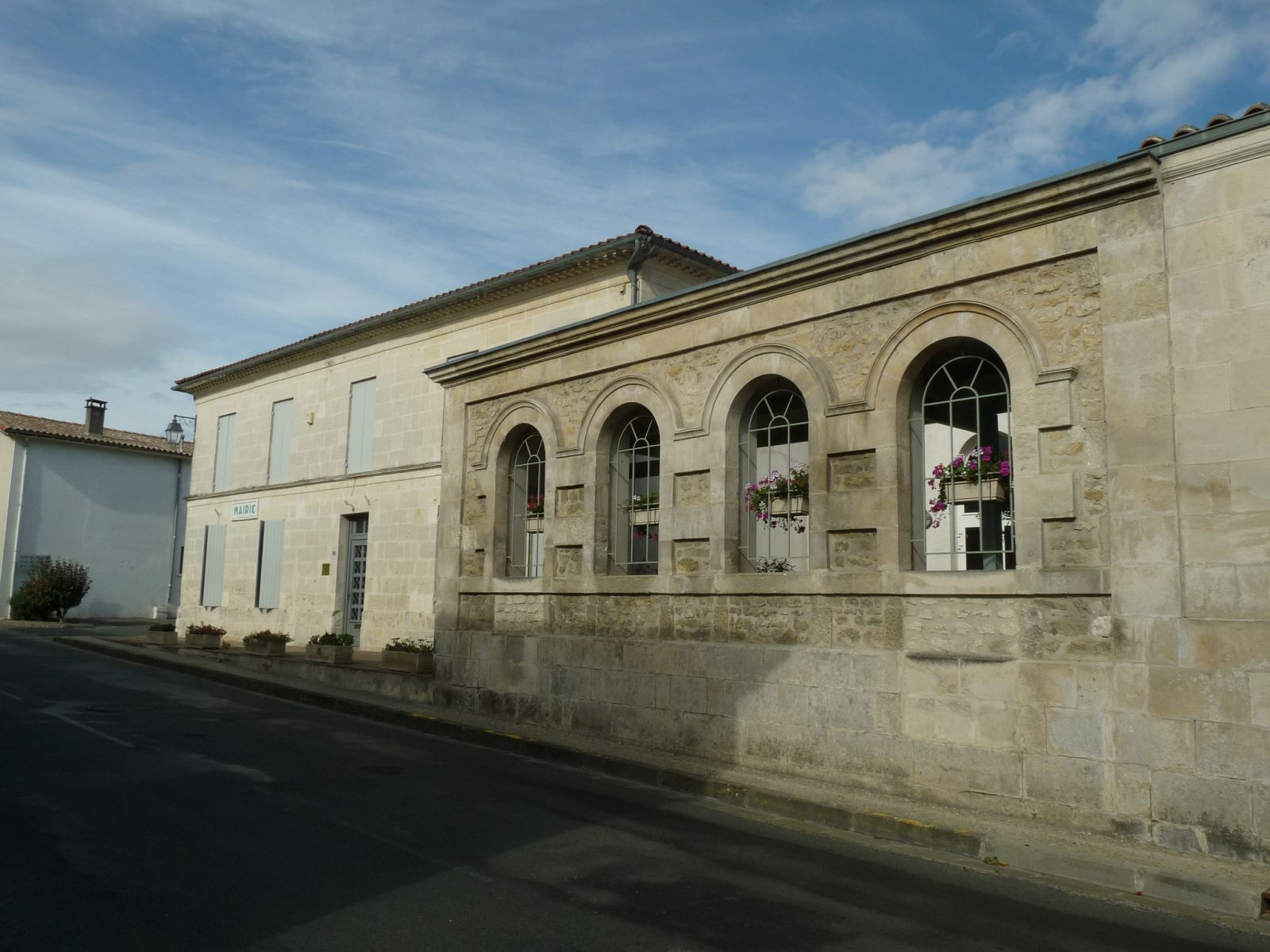
- Town hall
- Location of Épargnes
- Location within France Location within Nouvelle-Aquitaine
- Coordinates: 45°32′32″N 0°48′10″W
- Country: France
- Region: Nouvelle-Aquitaine
- Department: Charente-Maritime
- Arrondissement: Saintes
- Canton: Saintonge Estuaire
- Intercommunality: CA Royan Atlantique

Government
  - Mayor (2020–2026): Frédéric Duret
- Area^{1}: 23.40 km^{2} (9.03 sq mi)
- Highest elevation: 59 m (194 ft)
- Lowest elevation: 1 m (3.3 ft)
- Population (2023): 947
  - Density: 40.5/km^{2} (105/sq mi)
- Time zone: UTC+01:00 (CET)
  - Summer (DST): UTC+02:00 (CEST)
- INSEE/Postal code: 17152 /17120
- ^{1} French Land Register data, which excludes lakes, ponds, glaciers > 1 km^{2} (0.386 sq mi or 247 acres) and river estuaries.

Épargnes (French pronunciation: [epaʁɲ]) is a commune in the Charente-Maritime department in southwestern France.

== Population ==
Historical population
Year	Pop.	±% p.a.
1968	677	—
1975	683	+0.13%
1982	681	−0.04%
1990	676	−0.09%
1999	734	+0.92%
2007	789	+0.91%
2012	843	+1.33%
2017	843	+0.00%
2023	947	+1.96%
Source: INSEE

== See also ==
- Communes of the Charente-Maritime department
