= Grézac =

- Commune
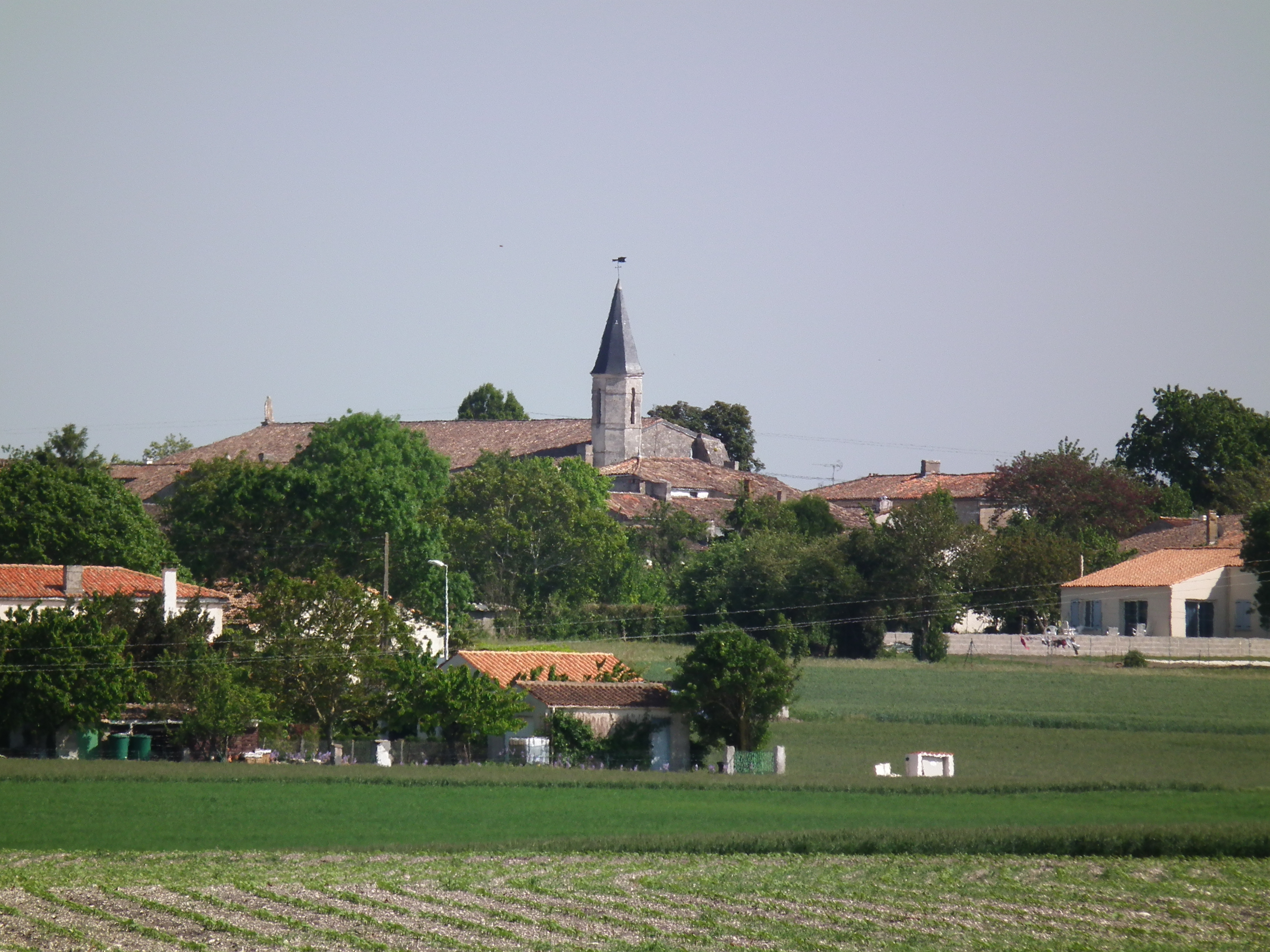
- A general view of Grézac
- Location of Grézac
- Location within France Location within Nouvelle-Aquitaine
- Coordinates: 45°36′18″N 0°50′23″W
- Country: France
- Region: Nouvelle-Aquitaine
- Department: Charente-Maritime
- Arrondissement: Saintes
- Canton: Saintonge Estuaire
- Intercommunality: CA Royan Atlantique

Government
  - Mayor (2020–2026): Bernard Pourpoint
- Area^{1}: 20.06 km^{2} (7.75 sq mi)
- Highest elevation: 54 m (177 ft)
- Lowest elevation: 11 m (36 ft)
- Population (2023): 955
  - Density: 47.6/km^{2} (123/sq mi)
- Time zone: UTC+01:00 (CET)
  - Summer (DST): UTC+02:00 (CEST)
- INSEE/Postal code: 17183 /17120
- ^{1} French Land Register data, which excludes lakes, ponds, glaciers > 1 km^{2} (0.386 sq mi or 247 acres) and river estuaries.

Grézac (French pronunciation: [ɡʁezak]) is a commune in the Charente-Maritime department in southwestern France.

== Population ==
Historical population
| Year | Pop. | ±% p.a. |
|---|---|---|
| 1968 | 607 | — |
| 1975 | 644 | +0.85% |
| 1982 | 614 | −0.68% |
| 1990 | 616 | +0.04% |
| 1999 | 592 | −0.44% |
| 2007 | 683 | +1.80% |
| 2012 | 882 | +5.25% |
| 2017 | 929 | +1.04% |
| 2023 | 955 | +0.46% |
Source: INSEE

== See also ==
- Communes of the Charente-Maritime department
