= Brie-sous-Mortagne =

- Commune
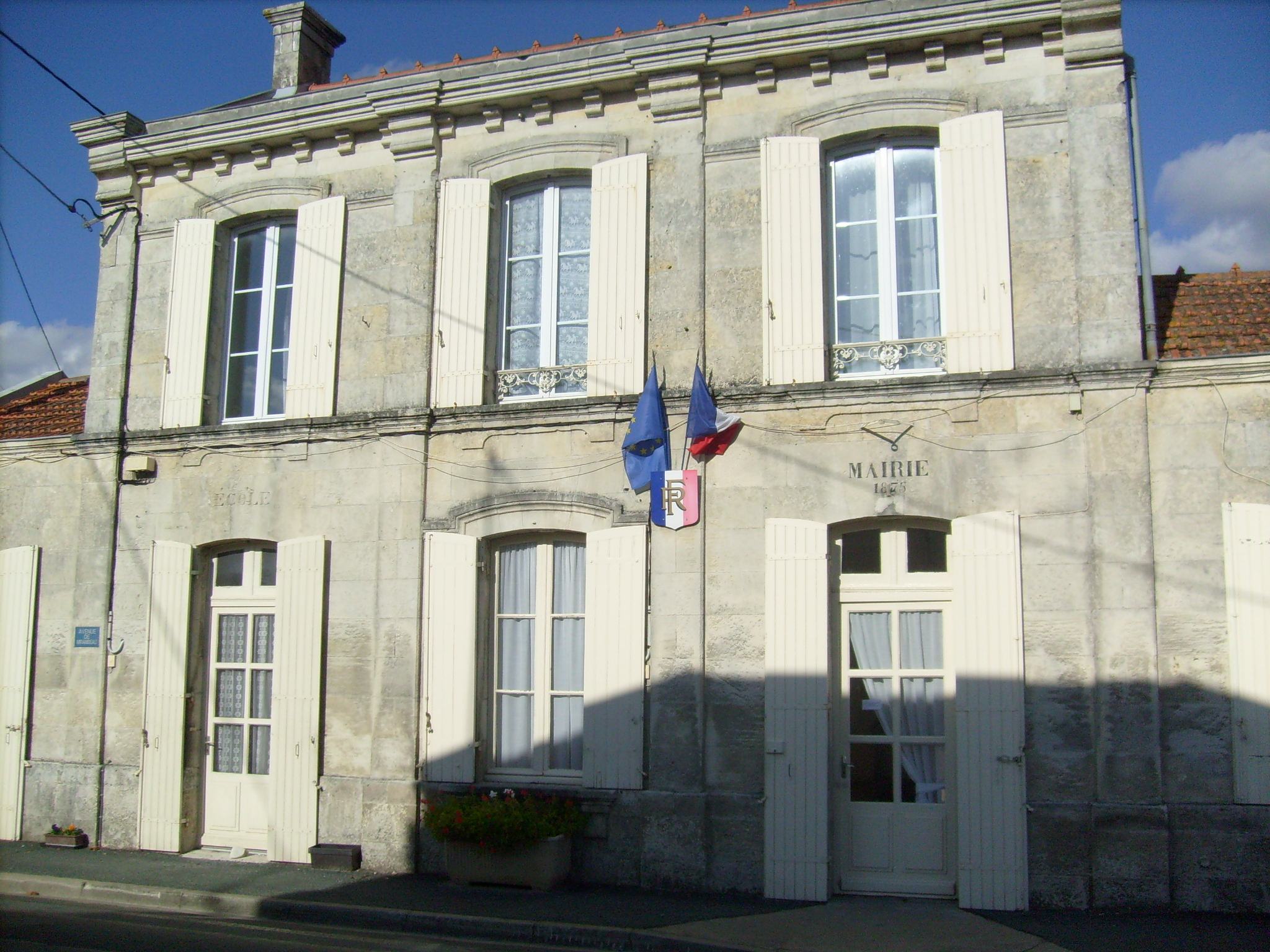
- The town hall in Brie-sous-Mortagne
- Location of Brie-sous-Mortagne
- Location within France Location within Nouvelle-Aquitaine
- Coordinates: 45°29′44″N 0°44′31″W
- Country: France
- Region: Nouvelle-Aquitaine
- Department: Charente-Maritime
- Arrondissement: Saintes
- Canton: Saintonge Estuaire
- Intercommunality: CA Royan Atlantique

Government
  - Mayor (2020–2026): Maurice Girerd
- Area^{1}: 7.22 km^{2} (2.79 sq mi)
- Highest elevation: 61 m (200 ft)
- Lowest elevation: 5 m (16 ft)
- Population (2023): 234
  - Density: 32.4/km^{2} (83.9/sq mi)
- Time zone: UTC+01:00 (CET)
  - Summer (DST): UTC+02:00 (CEST)
- INSEE/Postal code: 17068 /17120
- ^{1} French Land Register data, which excludes lakes, ponds, glaciers > 1 km^{2} (0.386 sq mi or 247 acres) and river estuaries.

Brie-sous-Mortagne (French pronunciation: [bʁi su mɔʁtaɲ], literally Brie under Mortagne) is a commune in the Charente-Maritime department in the Nouvelle-Aquitaine region in southwestern France.

== Population ==
Historical population
Year	Pop.	±% p.a.
1968	282	—
1975	287	+0.25%
1982	242	−2.41%
1990	228	−0.74%
1999	245	+0.80%
2007	248	+0.15%
2012	235	−1.07%
2017	236	+0.08%
2023	234	−0.14%
Source: INSEE

== See also ==
- Communes of the Charente-Maritime department
