= Saint-Fort-sur-Gironde =

- Commune
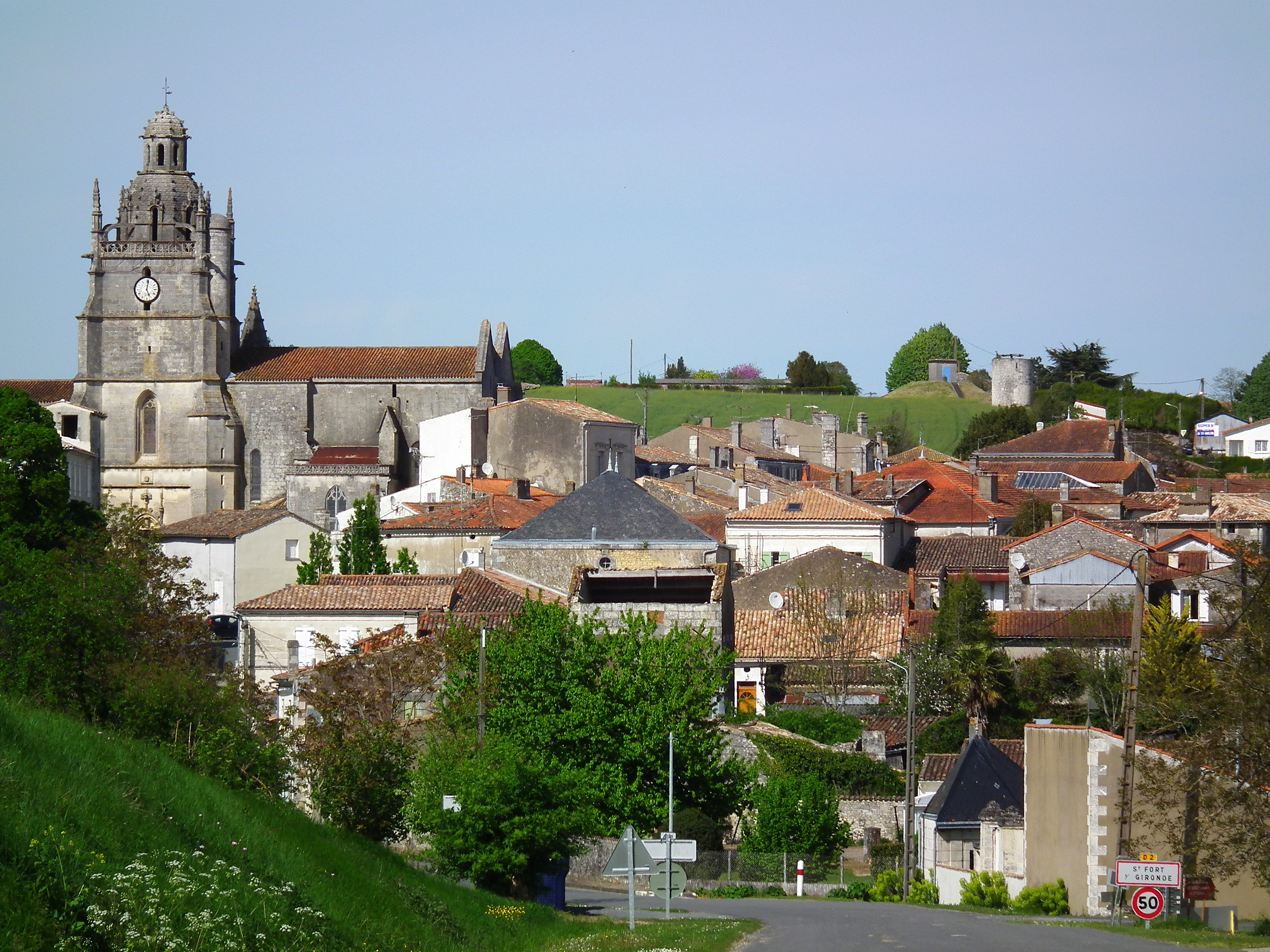
- A general view of Saint-Fort-sur-Gironde
- Location of Saint-Fort-sur-Gironde
- Location within France Location within Nouvelle-Aquitaine
- Coordinates: 45°27′38″N 0°43′15″W
- Country: France
- Region: Nouvelle-Aquitaine
- Department: Charente-Maritime
- Arrondissement: Jonzac
- Canton: Pons
- Intercommunality: Haute-Saintonge

Government
  - Mayor (2020–2026): Jean-Pierre Gervreau
- Area^{1}: 24.22 km^{2} (9.35 sq mi)
- Elevation: 47 m (154 ft)
- Highest elevation: 70 m (230 ft)
- Lowest elevation: 2 m (6.6 ft)
- Population (2023): 912
  - Density: 37.7/km^{2} (97.5/sq mi)
- Time zone: UTC+01:00 (CET)
  - Summer (DST): UTC+02:00 (CEST)
- INSEE/Postal code: 17328 /17240
- ^{1} French Land Register data, which excludes lakes, ponds, glaciers > 1 km^{2} (0.386 sq mi or 247 acres) and river estuaries.

Saint-Fort-sur-Gironde (French pronunciation: [sɛ̃ fɔʁ syʁ ʒiʁɔ̃d], literally Saint-Fort on Gironde) is a commune in the Charente-Maritime department in southwestern France.

== Population ==
Historical population
Year	Pop.	±% p.a.
1968	1,035	—
1975	1,036	+0.01%
1982	1,009	−0.38%
1990	1,012	+0.04%
1999	904	−1.25%
2007	908	+0.06%
2012	869	−0.87%
2017	909	+0.90%
2023	912	+0.05%
Source: INSEE

== See also ==
- Communes of the Charente-Maritime department
