= Saint-Germain-de-Vibrac =

Commune in Nouvelle-Aquitaine, France

- Commune
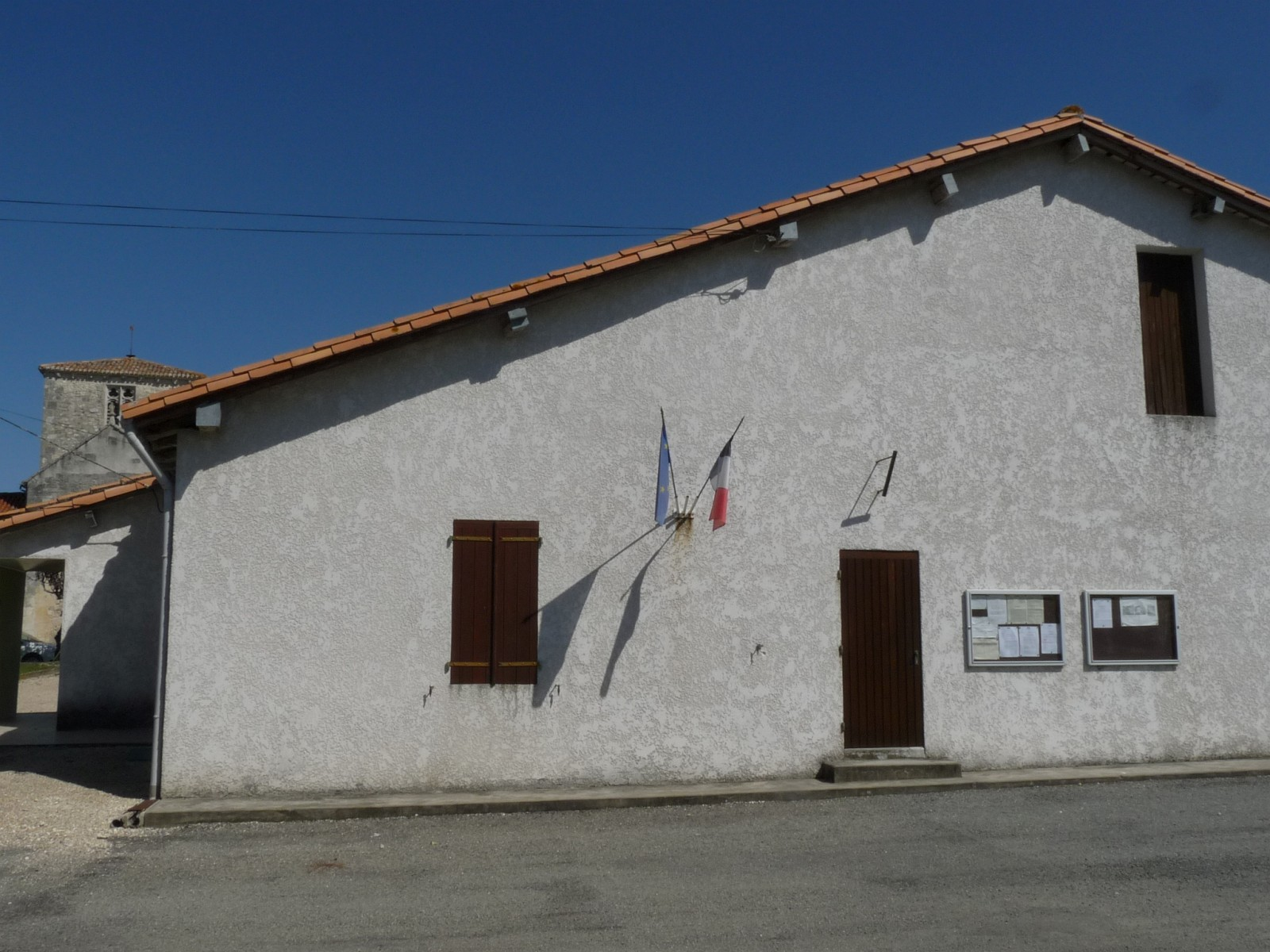
- The town hall in Saint-Germain-de-Vibrac
- Location of Saint-Germain-de-Vibrac
- Location within France Location within Nouvelle-Aquitaine
- Coordinates: 45°25′34″N 0°19′21″W
- Country: France
- Region: Nouvelle-Aquitaine
- Department: Charente-Maritime
- Arrondissement: Jonzac
- Canton: Jonzac

Government
  - Mayor (2020–2026): Sylvie Malangin
- Area^{1}: 7.17 km^{2} (2.77 sq mi)
- Elevation: 50 m (160 ft)
- Highest elevation: 99 m (325 ft)
- Lowest elevation: 47 m (154 ft)
- Population (2023): 186
  - Density: 25.9/km^{2} (67.2/sq mi)
- Time zone: UTC+01:00 (CET)
  - Summer (DST): UTC+02:00 (CEST)
- INSEE/Postal code: 17341 /17500
- ^{1} French Land Register data, which excludes lakes, ponds, glaciers > 1 km^{2} (0.386 sq mi or 247 acres) and river estuaries.

Saint-Germain-de-Vibrac (French pronunciation: [sɛ̃ ʒɛʁmɛ̃ də vibʁak]) is a commune in the Charente-Maritime department in the Nouvelle-Aquitaine region in southwestern France.

== Population ==
Historical population
Year	Pop.	±% p.a.
1968	216	—
1975	224	+0.52%
1982	201	−1.54%
1990	197	−0.25%
1999	196	−0.06%
2007	198	+0.13%
2012	201	+0.30%
2017	190	−1.12%
2023	186	−0.35%
Source: INSEE

== See also ==
- Communes of the Charente-Maritime department
