= Boutenac-Touvent =

- Commune
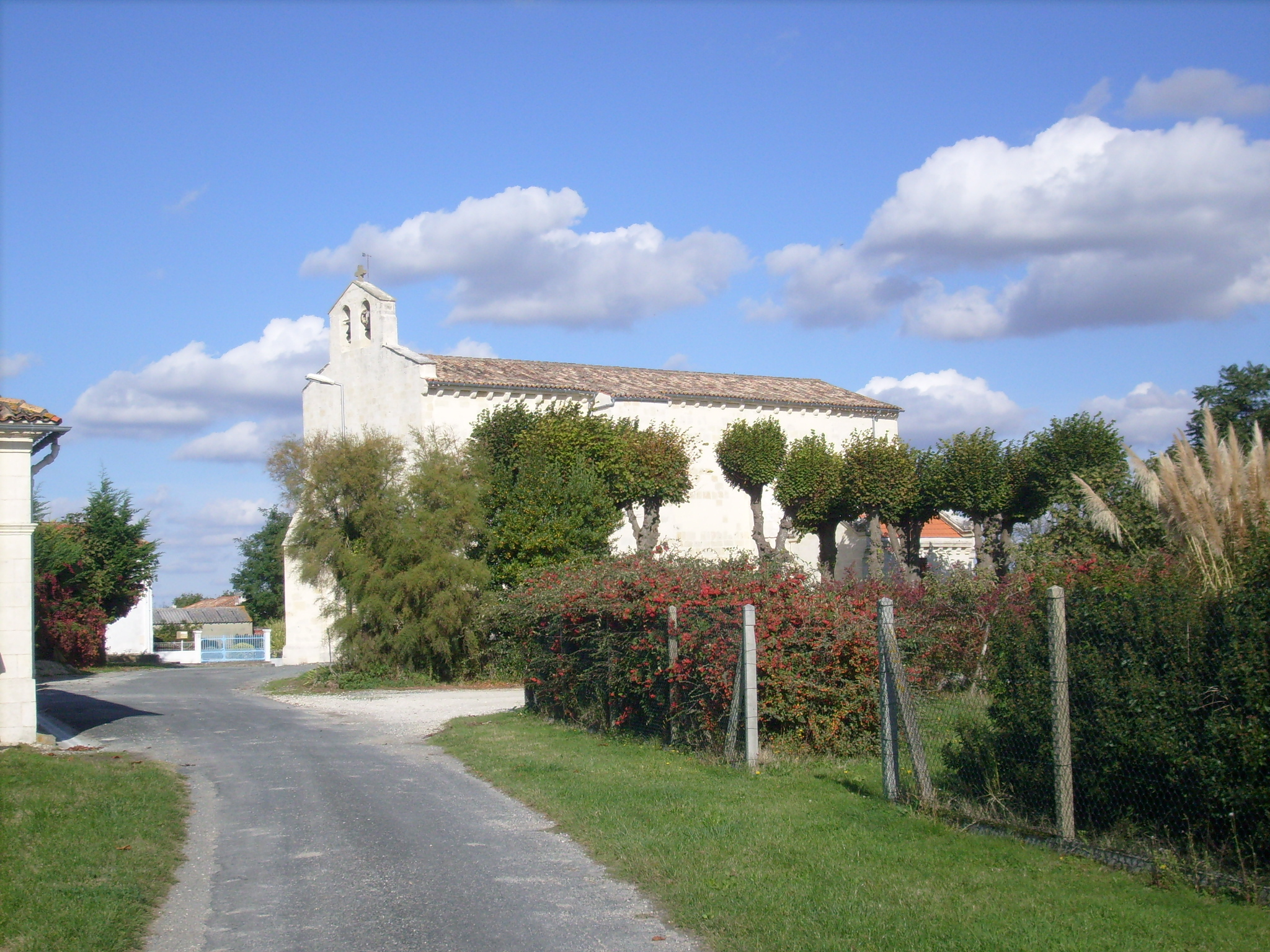
- The church in Boutenac-Touvent
- Location of Boutenac-Touvent
- Location within France Location within Nouvelle-Aquitaine
- Coordinates: 45°30′18″N 0°45′17″W
- Country: France
- Region: Nouvelle-Aquitaine
- Department: Charente-Maritime
- Arrondissement: Saintes
- Canton: Saintonge Estuaire
- Intercommunality: CA Royan Atlantique

Government
  - Mayor (2021–2026): Nelly Pinet
- Area^{1}: 3.11 km^{2} (1.20 sq mi)
- Highest elevation: 64 m (210 ft)
- Lowest elevation: 6 m (20 ft)
- Population (2023): 230
  - Density: 74/km^{2} (190/sq mi)
- Time zone: UTC+01:00 (CET)
  - Summer (DST): UTC+02:00 (CEST)
- INSEE/Postal code: 17060 /17120
- ^{1} French Land Register data, which excludes lakes, ponds, glaciers > 1 km^{2} (0.386 sq mi or 247 acres) and river estuaries.

Boutenac-Touvent (French pronunciation: [butnak tuvɑ̃]) is a commune in the Charente-Maritime department in the Nouvelle-Aquitaine region in southwestern France.

== Population ==
Historical population
Year	Pop.	±% p.a.
1968	246	—
1975	227	−1.14%
1982	231	+0.25%
1990	219	−0.66%
1999	217	−0.10%
2007	194	−1.39%
2012	215	+2.08%
2017	224	+0.82%
2023	230	+0.44%
Source: INSEE

== See also ==
- Communes of the Charente-Maritime department
