= Meschers-sur-Gironde =

- Commune
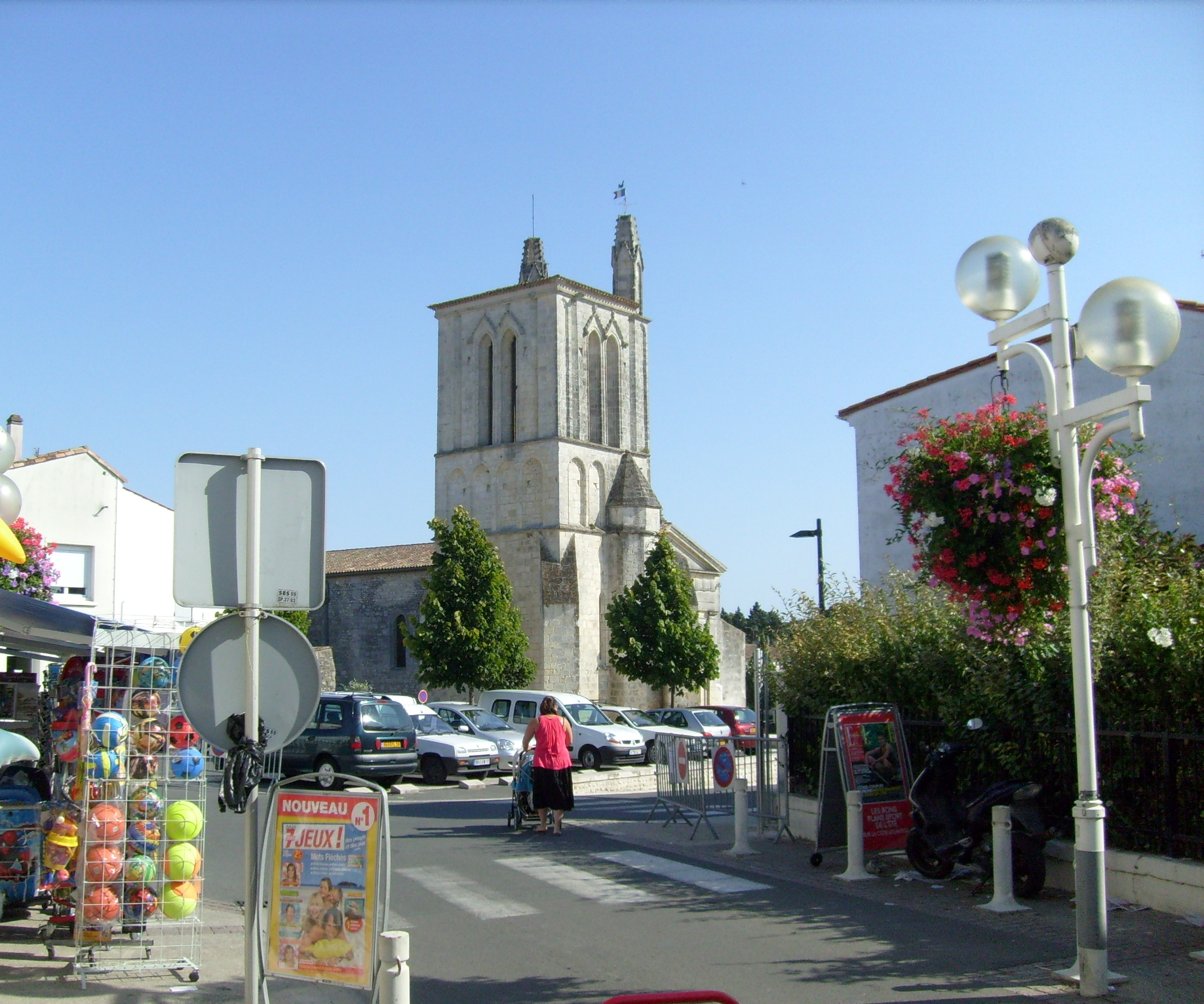
- The church and surroundings in Meschers-sur-Gironde

- Coat of arms
- Location of Meschers-sur-Gironde
- Location within France Location within Nouvelle-Aquitaine
- Coordinates: 45°33′27″N 0°57′14″W
- Country: France
- Region: Nouvelle-Aquitaine
- Department: Charente-Maritime
- Arrondissement: Rochefort
- Canton: Saintonge Estuaire
- Intercommunality: CA Royan Atlantique

Government
  - Mayor (2020–2026): Françoise Fribourg
- Area^{1}: 15.98 km^{2} (6.17 sq mi)
- Highest elevation: 39 m (128 ft)
- Lowest elevation: 0 m (0 ft)
- Population (2023): 3,180
  - Density: 199/km^{2} (515/sq mi)
- Time zone: UTC+01:00 (CET)
  - Summer (DST): UTC+02:00 (CEST)
- INSEE/Postal code: 17230 /17132
- ^{1} French Land Register data, which excludes lakes, ponds, glaciers > 1 km^{2} (0.386 sq mi or 247 acres) and river estuaries.

Meschers-sur-Gironde (French pronunciation: [meʃe syʁ ʒiʁɔ̃d], literally Meschers on Gironde) is a commune in the Charente-Maritime department, southwestern France.

== Population ==
Historical population

Year	Pop.	±% p.a.
1793	1,004	—
1800	962	−0.61%
1806	901	−1.09%
1821	995	+0.66%
1831	1,104	+1.04%
1836	1,117	+0.23%
1841	1,146	+0.51%
1846	1,143	−0.05%
1851	1,092	−0.91%
1856	1,040	−0.97%
1861	1,101	+1.15%
1866	1,106	+0.09%
1872	1,068	−0.58%
1876	1,026	−1.00%
1881	1,039	+0.25%
1886	1,064	+0.48%
1891	1,024	−0.76%
1896	954	−1.41%
1901	900	−1.16%

Year	Pop.	±% p.a.
1906	903	+0.07%
1911	952	+1.06%
1921	861	−1.00%
1926	818	−1.02%
1931	816	−0.05%
1936	890	+1.75%
1946	1,034	+1.51%
1954	1,175	+1.61%
1962	1,339	+1.65%
1968	1,475	+1.63%
1975	1,546	+0.67%
1982	1,649	+0.93%
1990	1,862	+1.53%
1999	2,234	+2.04%
2007	2,673	+2.27%
2012	2,955	+2.03%
2017	3,110	+1.03%
2023	3,180	+0.37%

Source: EHESS and INSEE (1968-2023)

== See also ==
- Communes of the Charente-Maritime department
