= Chasseneuil-du-Poitou =

- Commune
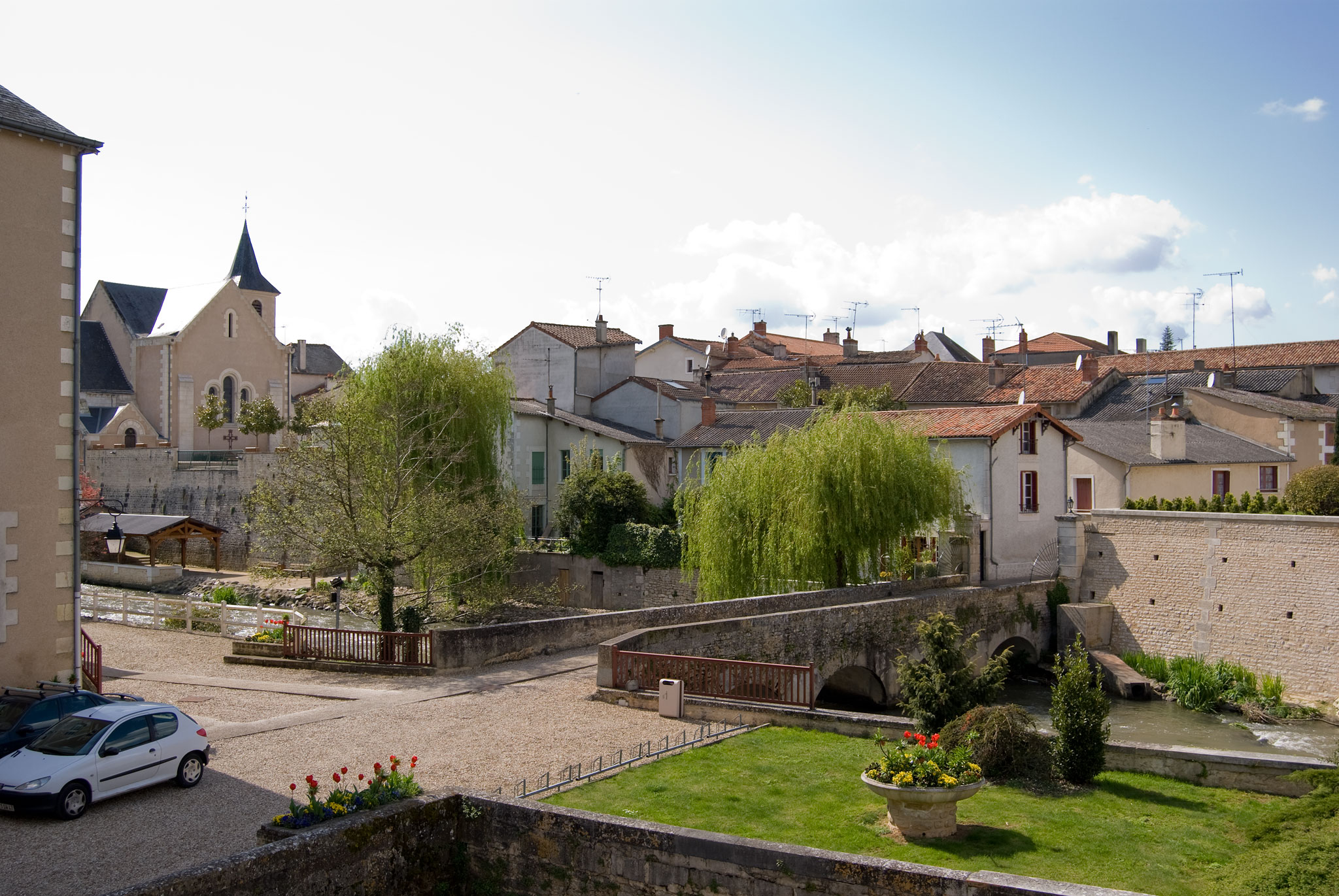
- The centre of Chasseneuil-du-Poitou
- Location of Chasseneuil-du-Poitou
- Location within France Location within Nouvelle-Aquitaine
- Coordinates: 46°39′07″N 0°22′23″E
- Country: France
- Region: Nouvelle-Aquitaine
- Department: Vienne
- Arrondissement: Poitiers
- Canton: Chasseneuil-du-Poitou
- Intercommunality: CU Grand Poitiers

Government
  - Mayor (2020–2026): Claude Eidelstein
- Area^{1}: 17.61 km^{2} (6.80 sq mi)
- Population (2023): 4,743
  - Density: 269.3/km^{2} (697.6/sq mi)
- Time zone: UTC+01:00 (CET)
  - Summer (DST): UTC+02:00 (CEST)
- INSEE/Postal code: 86062 /86360
- ^{1} French Land Register data, which excludes lakes, ponds, glaciers > 1 km^{2} (0.386 sq mi or 247 acres) and river estuaries.

Chasseneuil-du-Poitou (French pronunciation: [ʃasnœj dy pwatu], literally Chasseneuil of Poitou) is a commune in the Vienne department, administrative region of Nouvelle-Aquitaine, western France.

It lies 7 km north of the centre of Poitiers. Its inhabitants are called the Chasseneuillais.

Chasseneuil-du-Poitou is the home of the Parc du Futuroscope, and the Technopole du Futuroscope, making up part of the École nationale supérieure de mécanique et d'aérotechnique de Poitiers (English: Poitiers' National superior school of mechanics and aeronautics).

Former French Prime Minister and Senator Jean-Pierre Raffarin served as assistant to the Mayor between 1995 and 2001.

== Economy ==
The economy has largely depended on tourism since the construction 20 years ago of the Futuroscope park, although in addition to this, it is the home of part of the Futuroscope Technopole, which holds 200 high tech businesses, and helps educate 2,000 students. The American company SAFT has a factory in the town, which furnishes a large part of the European battery market.

Because of the presence of the park and technopole, a new TGV station, "Gare du Futuroscope", was built in 2000. It is served by up to 40 trains per day.

== History ==
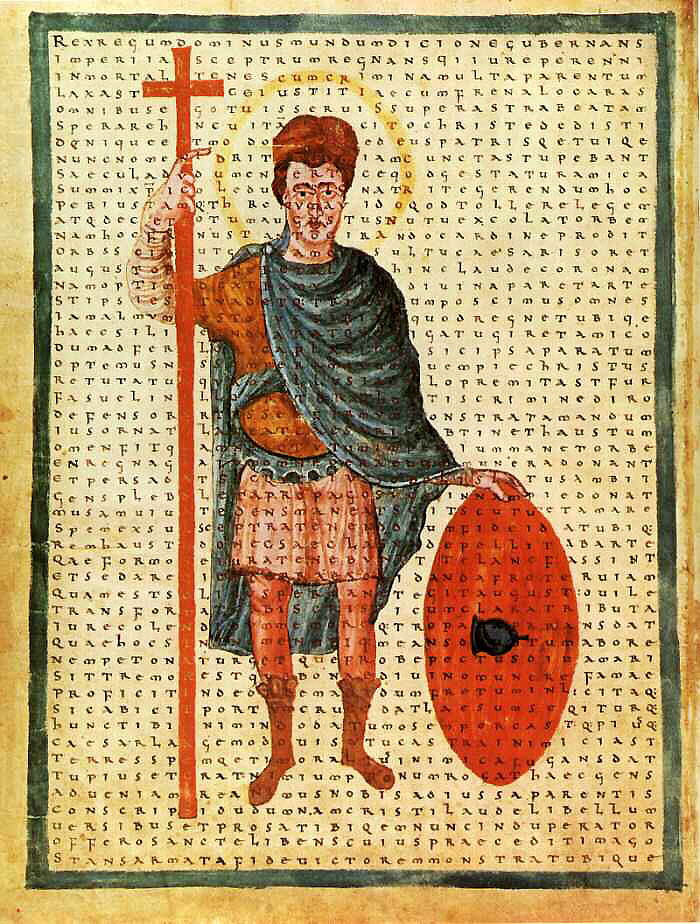

The town, then simply the villa Cassinogilum, was a royal residence of first the Merovingian, and then Carolingian dynasties in France. Louis the Pious, later King of Aquitaine and King of the Franks was born in the villa on 778, when his mother, Hildegard was staying in the villa whilst his father Charlemagne was on campaign in Spain.

== Administration ==
The town has a 27-member town council, led by Mayor Claude Eidelstein, and his seven assistant Mayors. The town is part of Vienne's 1st constituency, and is represented in the National Assembly by Jacques Savatier (LREM).

== Education ==
- École nationale supérieure de mécanique et d'aérotechnique

== Demographics ==
Historical population
Year	Pop.	±% p.a.
1968	2,144	—
1975	2,332	+1.21%
1982	2,888	+3.10%
1990	3,002	+0.49%
1999	3,845	+2.79%
2007	4,497	+1.98%
2012	4,572	+0.33%
2017	4,704	+0.57%
2023	4,743	+0.14%
Source: INSEE

== Twinning ==
Chasseneuil-du-Poitou is twinned with the Irish town of Passage West. The twinning charter was signed by the then Mayor of Passage West, Mr. Jim Murphy, and the then Mayor of Chasseneuil-du-Poitou, Mr. Pierre Giret, at the Town Hall in Passage West in 1997. Annual exchange visits for both members of the Town Council and local residents are organised.

== Places and monuments ==
- Futuroscope Park

== Gallery ==
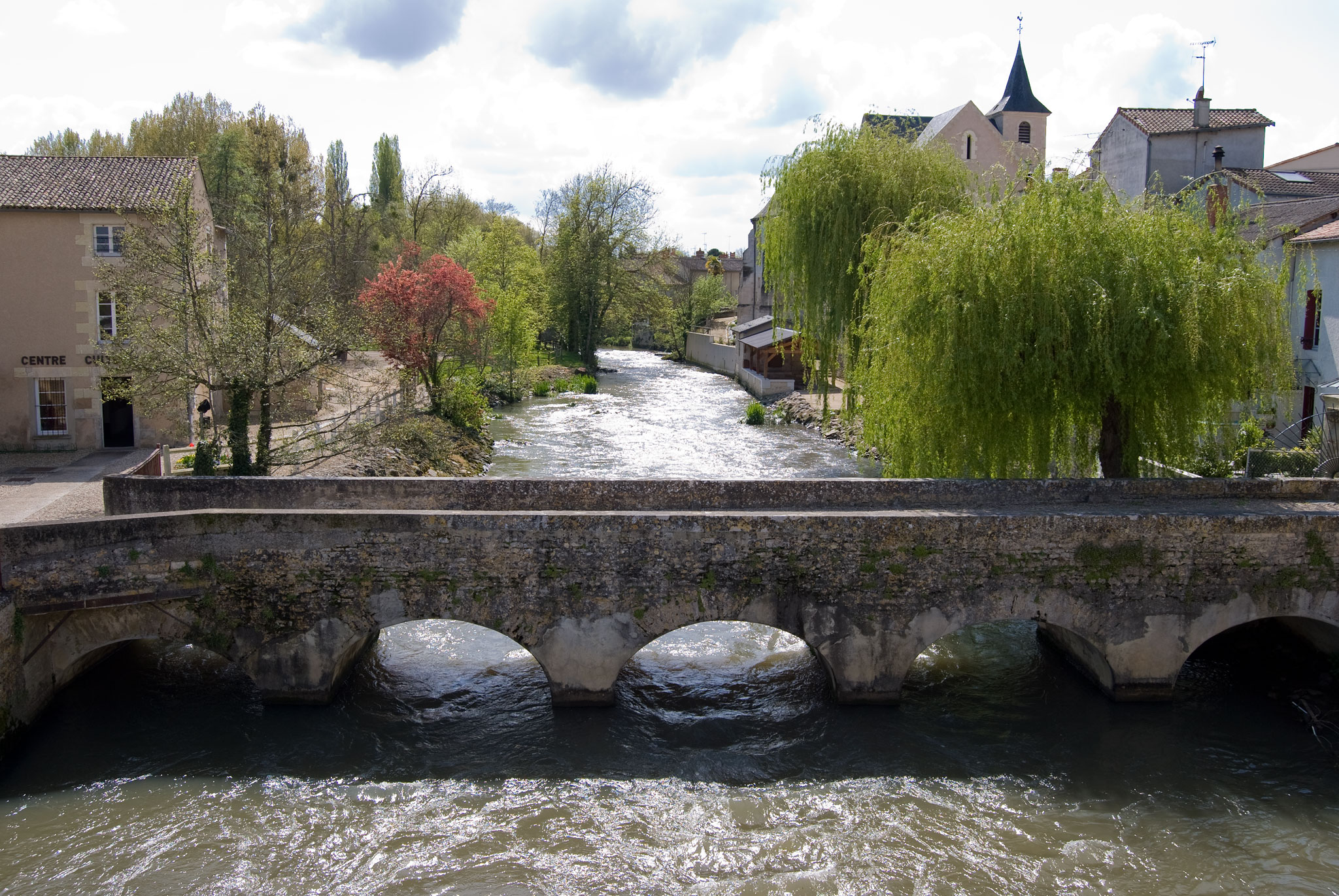
Chasseneuil-du-Poitou, centre

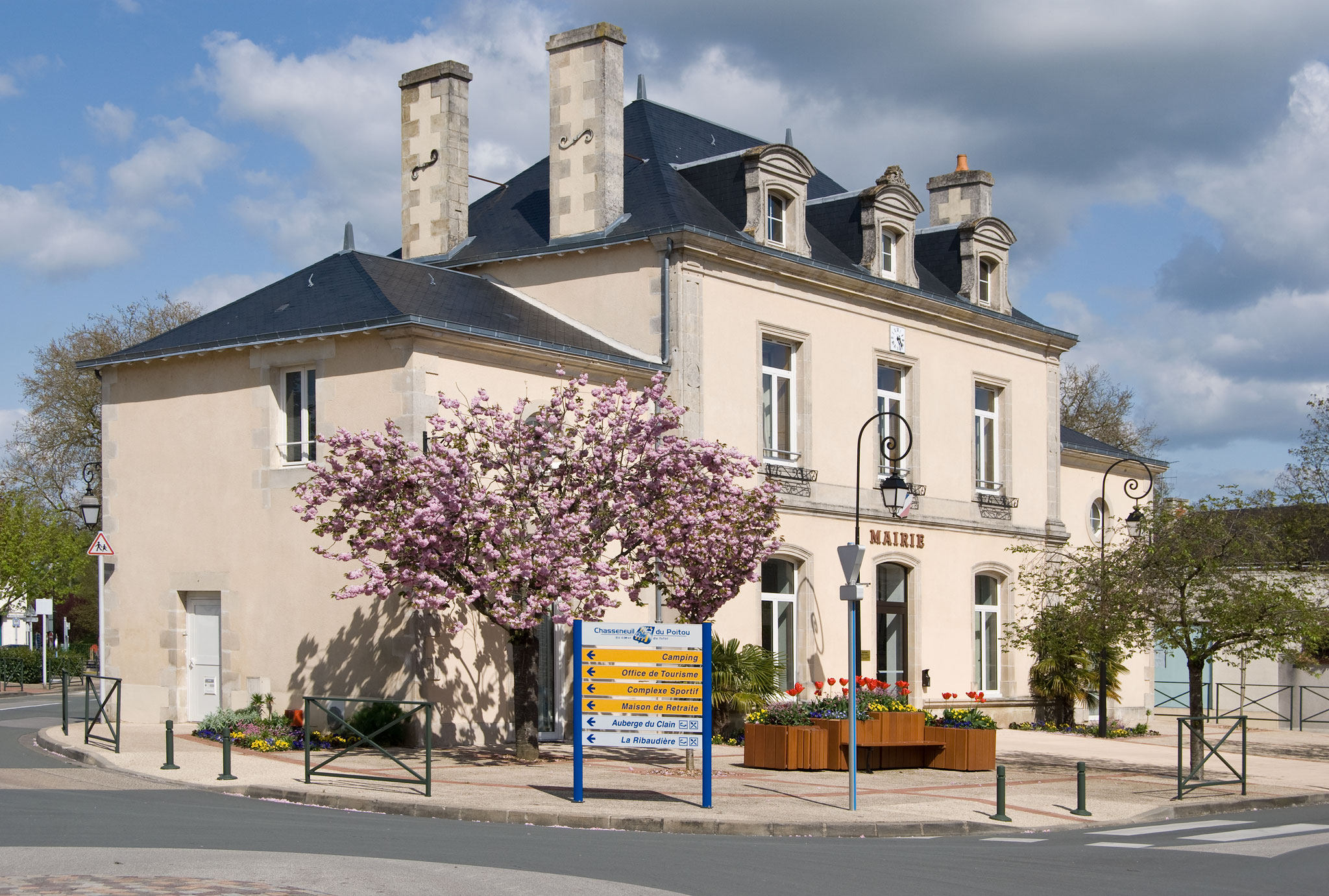
La mairie

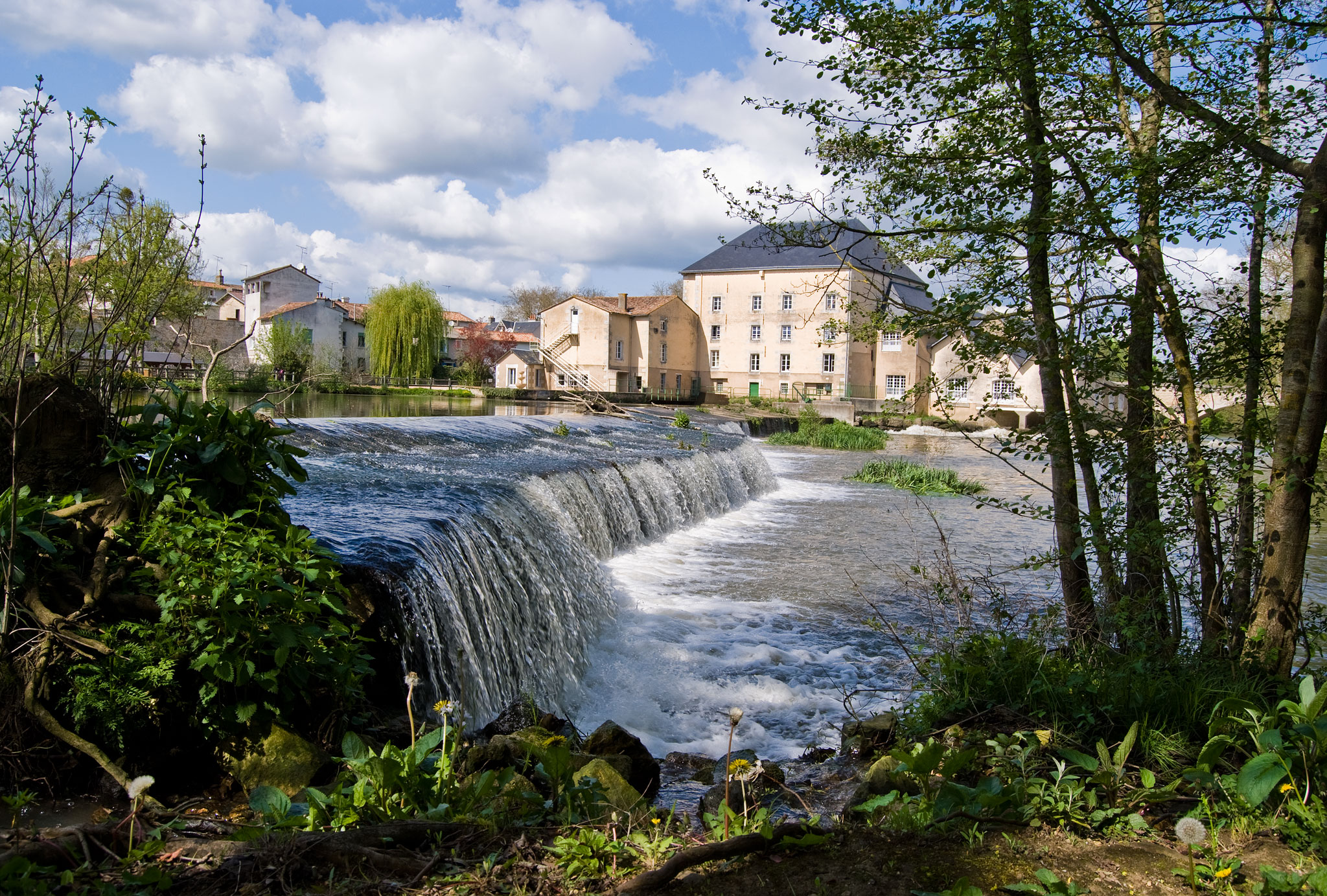
Le Clain

== See also ==
- Communes of the Vienne department
