= Françoise Ballet-Blu =

French politician

Member of the National Assembly for Vienne's 1st constituency
- In office 25 August 2020 – 21 June 2022
- Preceded by: Jacques Savatier
- Succeeded by: Lisa Belluco

Personal details
- Born: 9 June 1964 (age 61) France
- Party: En Marche

Françoise Ballet-Blu (born 9 May 1964) is a French politician who has been Member of Parliament for Vienne's 1st constituency from 2020 to 2022. She ran for reelection in 2022 but lost her seat to Lisa Belluco, the NUPES candidate.
