= Alain Claeys =

French politician

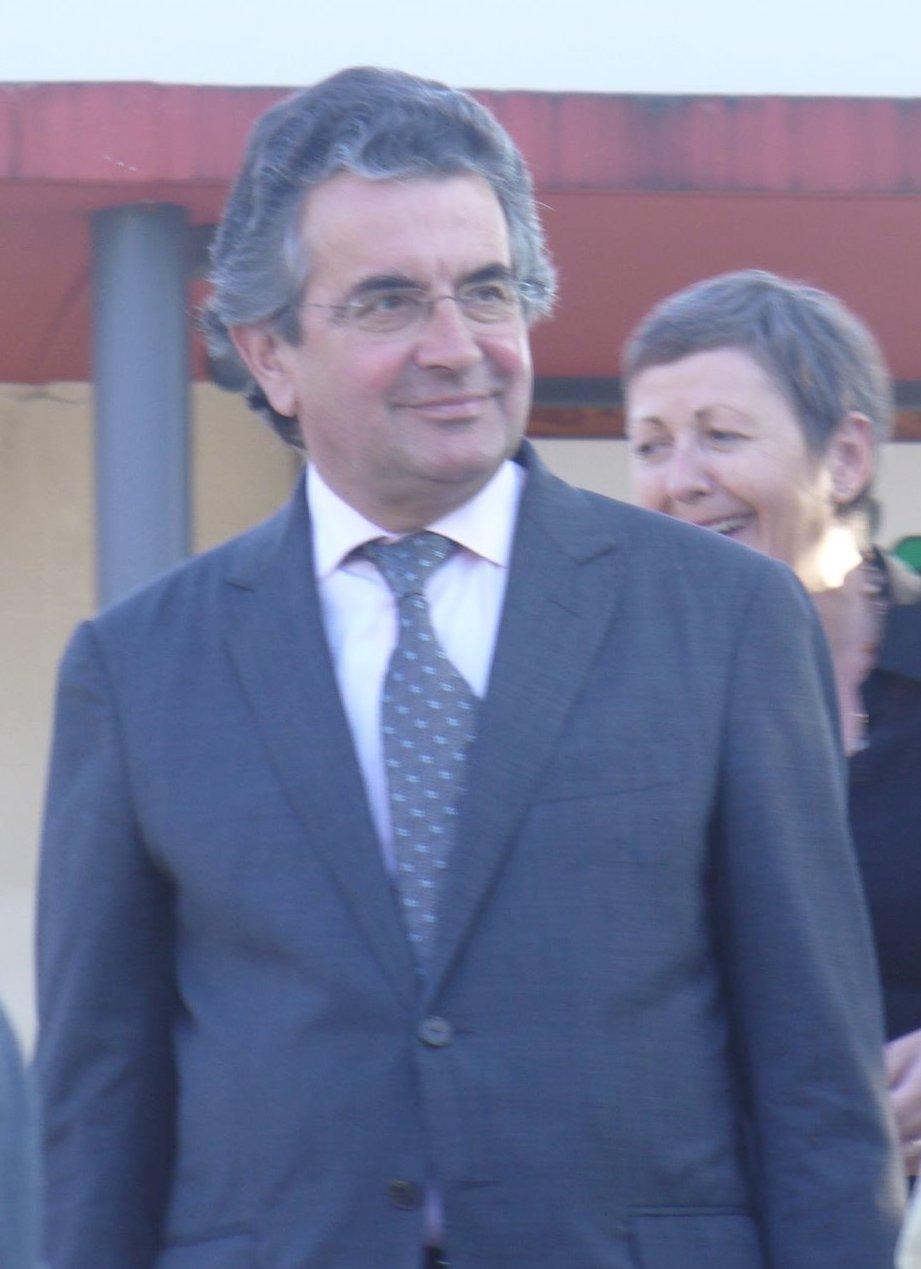

Member of the National Assembly of France for 1st Constituency of Vienne
- In office 1997 French legislative election – 2017 French legislative election
- Succeeded by: Jacques Savatier

Mayor of Poitiers
- In office 16 March 2008 – 3 July 2020

Member of the General Council of Vienne
- In office 1982–2008

Member of the Poitou-Charentes Regional Council
- In office 1986–1997

Personal details
- Born: 25 August 1948 (age 78) Poitiers, France
- Party: Socialist Party
- Education: University of Poitiers
- Profession: Teacher

Alain Claeys (born 25 August 1948) is a French politician. He is a member of the Socialist Party, former Mayor of Poitiers (2008-2020) and a former member of the National Assembly of France for the first constituency of the Vienne department (1997-2017). He sits in the Socialist, Radical, Citizen and Miscellaneous Left group in the National Assembly.

In 2013, as Mayor of Poitiers, he decided to sell the Poitiers Theater. The decision to destroy the theater designed by architect Édouard Lardillier, in order to build a commercial gallery and some flats, through a real estate business was controversial.

He graduated from the University of Poitiers.

== Biography ==
He received part of his education at the University of Poitiers, where he obtained the rank of assistant professor in the Faculty of Economics.

In 1977, he became chief of staff to Jacques Santrot, who had just been elected mayor of Poitiers. He remained in this position until 1992.

He was elected deputy on June 1, 1997, for the 11th legislature (1997-2002), in the first district of Vienne. He is a member of the Socialist Party (France). He succeeded Jacques Santrot as mayor of Poitiers in the 2008 municipal elections, winning in the first round with 54.52% of the vote. Along with Santrot, he was one of Laurent Fabius' most active supporters. He was treasurer of the Socialist Party between 1994 and 2003. Alain Claeys was also a member of the Vienne General Council from 1982 to 2008 and the Poitou-Charentes Regional Council between 1986 and 1997.

He was re-elected as a member of Legislator in 2002, 2007, and then in 2012.

Alain Claeys is a specialist in Bioethics. He is also responsible for higher education within Vincent Peillon team, who was responsible for education under François Hollande during the 2012 presidential campaign and then under the Ayrault government. On February 3, 2021, he was appointed to the National Consultative Ethics Committee for Life Sciences and Health by the Minister for Solidarity and Health.

In light of the upcoming law on the non-Dual mandate, Alain Claeys announced that he would be running in the 2014 municipal elections and would not seek re-election as a member of parliament. He was re-elected mayor of Poitiers with 41.08% of the vote in a four-way runoff against Jacqueline Daigre (UMP-UDI), Christiane Fraysse (EELV), and Alain Verdin (FN).

On January 27, 2016, the Jean Leonetti law on the authorization of deep and continuous sedation for terminally ill patients was adopted by the French Parliament.

He did not stand for re-election in the 2017 legislative elections. He ran again for mayor of Poitiers in 2020, but was defeated in the second round by Green Party candidate Léonore Moncond'huy.
