= Vienne's 1st constituency =

Constituency of the National Assembly of France

1st constituency of Vienne
- inline Constituency of the National Assembly of France

- Constituency in department

- Vienne in France
- Deputy: Lisa Belluco; EELV
- Department: Vienne
- Cantons: Mirebeau, Neuville-de-Poitou, Poitiers I, Poitiers II, Poitiers VII, Saint-Georges-lès-Baillargeaux, Saint-Julien-l'Ars, Vouneuil-sur-Vienne.

The 1st constituency of Vienne is a French legislative constituency in the Vienne département. It is represented in the XVth legislature by Jacques Savatier, of La République En Marche!.

== Deputies ==
| Election | Member | Party |
|---|---|---|
| 1988 | Jacques Santrot | PS |
| 1993 | Éric Dubot | UDF |
| 1997 | Alain Claeys | PS |
| 2002 | Alain Claeys | PS |
| 2007 | Alain Claeys | PS |
| 2012 | Alain Claeys | PS |
| 2017 | Jacques Savatier | LREM |
| 2020 | Françoise Ballet-Blu | LREM |
| 2022 | Lisa Belluco | EELV |

== Election results ==
=== 2024 ===
| Candidate | Party | Alliance | First round | | Second round | |
| Candidate | Party | Alliance | Votes | % | Votes | % |
|---|---|---|---|---|---|---|
| Lisa Belluco | LE-EELV | NFP | 18,232 | 33.14 | 22,660 | 40.64 |
| Emmanuelle Darles | RN | | 15,918 | 28.93 | 16,858 | 30.23 |
| Séverine Saint-Pé | HOR | Ensemble | 15,875 | 28.85 | 16,244 | 29.13 |
| Aurélien Tricot | Ind | DVG | 4,399 | 7.99 | | |
| Ludovic Gaillard | LO | | 599 | 1.09 | | |
| Valid votes | | | 55,023 | 97.14 | 55,762 | 97.45 |
| Blank votes | | | 1,045 | 1.84 | 1.52 | 1.84 |
| Null votes | | | 577 | 1.02 | 409 | 0.71 |
| Turnout | | | 56,645 | 69.89 | 57,223 | 70.59 |
| Abstentions | | | 24,408 | 30.11 | 23,486 | 29.41 |
| Registered voters | | | 81,053 | | 81,069 | |
| Result | | | LE-EELV HOLD | | | |

=== 2022 ===
Legislative Election 2022: Vienne's 1st constituency
| Party | Candidate | Votes | % | ±% |
|---|---|---|---|---|
| EELV (NUPÉS) | Lisa Belluco | 12,972 | 32.56 | +0.75 |
| LREM (Ensemble) | Françoise Ballet-Blu | 11,226 | 28.17 | -14.12 |
| RN | Kevin Courtois | 6,254 | 15.70 | +5.29 |
| UDI (UDC) | Jérôme Neveux | 5,324 | 13.36 | +1.66 |
| REC | Marie-Aline De Mascureau | 1,181 | 2.96 | N/A |
| DVE | Alexandre Giraudet | 1,147 | 2.88 | N/A |
| Others | N/A | 1,740 | 4.37 | |
| Turnout | | 39,844 | 50.74 | +1.74 |
2nd round result
| EELV (NUPÉS) | Lisa Belluco | 18,918 | 51.36 | +10.98 |
| LREM (Ensemble) | Françoise Ballet-Blu | 17,917 | 48.64 | −10.98 |
| Turnout | | 36,835 | 49.33 | +8.99 |
| EELV gain from LREM | | | | |

=== 2017 ===
Legislative Election 2017: Vienne's 1st constituency
| Party | Candidate | Votes | % | ±% |
|---|---|---|---|---|
| LREM | Jacques Savatier | 16,486 | 42.29 | |
| LFI | Céline Cuvillier | 5,892 | 15.12 | |
| LR | Jacqueline Daigre | 4,562 | 11.70 | |
| FN | Arnaud Fage | 4,058 | 10.41 | |
| PS | Xavier Moinier | 3,646 | 9.35 | |
| EELV | Marjorie Monni | 1,772 | 4.55 | |
| PCF | Anne Joulain | 1,086 | 2.79 | |
| Others | N/A | 1,479 | | |
| Turnout | | 38,981 | 49.00 | |
2nd round result
| LREM | Jacques Savatier | 19,135 | 59.62 | |
| LFI | Céline Cuvillier | 12,961 | 40.38 | |
| Turnout | | 32,096 | 40.34 | |
| LREM gain from PS | | | | |

=== 2012 ===
Legislative Election 2012: Vienne's 1st constituency
| Party | Candidate | Votes | % | ±% |
|---|---|---|---|---|
| PS | Alain Claeys | 20,878 | 48.44 | |
| UMP | Jacqueline Daigre | 9,902 | 22.98 | |
| FN | Laure Brard | 4,371 | 10.14 | |
| PCF | Nathalie Rimbault-Raitiere | 3,155 | 7.32 | |
| EELV | Arnaud Clairand | 1,906 | 4.42 | |
| MoDem | Bernard Thevenet | 1,100 | 2.55 | |
| Others | N/A | 1,785 | | |
| Turnout | | 43,097 | 55.80 | |
2nd round result
| PS | Alain Claeys | 26,456 | 65.64 | |
| UMP | Jacqueline Daigre | 13,846 | 34.36 | |
| Turnout | | 40,302 | 52.18 | |
| PS hold | | | | |

=== 2007 ===
Legislative Election 2007: Vienne's 1st constituency
| Party | Candidate | Votes | % | ±% |
|---|---|---|---|---|
| PS | Alain Claeys | 21,780 | 42.82 | |
| UMP | Jacqueline Daigre | 17,389 | 34.19 | |
| MoDem | Sadiman Anil | 3,432 | 6.75 | |
| LV | Marie Legrand | 1,880 | 3.70 | |
| FN | Josiane Laraque | 1,411 | 2.77 | |
| Far left | Bruno Riondet | 1,045 | 2.05 | |
| Others | N/A | 3,923 | | |
| Turnout | | 51,923 | 62.64 | |
2nd round result
| PS | Alain Claeys | 29,549 | 59.10 | |
| UMP | Jacqueline Daigre | 20,450 | 40.90 | |
| Turnout | | 51,411 | 62.02 | |
| PS hold | | | | |

=== 2002 ===
Legislative Election 2002: Vienne's 1st constituency
| Party | Candidate | Votes | % | ±% |
|---|---|---|---|---|
| PS | Alain Claeys | 19,764 | 43.20 | |
| UMP | Dominique Hummel | 15,356 | 33.57 | |
| FN | Magalie Servant | 3,164 | 6.92 | |
| LV | Robert Rochaud | 2,082 | 4.55 | |
| CPNT | Pascale Guittet | 1,425 | 3.11 | |
| PCF | Jean-Paul Dampure | 1,045 | 2.28 | |
| Others | N/A | 2,913 | | |
| Turnout | | 52,383 | 68.55 | |
2nd round result
| PS | Alain Claeys | 24,796 | 50.68 | |
| UMP | Dominique Hummel | 24,127 | 49.32 | |
| Turnout | | 50,238 | 65.74 | |
| PS hold | | | | |

=== 1997 ===
Legislative Election 1997: Vienne's 1st constituency
| Party | Candidate | Votes | % | ±% |
|---|---|---|---|---|
| PS | Alain Claeys | 16,417 | 34.60 | |
| UDF | Eric Duboc | 14,778 | 31.15 | |
| FN | Joël Le Nestic | 4,619 | 9.74 | |
| PCF | Jean-Jacques Guerin | 2,991 | 6.30 | |
| LV | Marie Legrand | 2,466 | 5.20 | |
| LO | Alain Grenet | 1,310 | 2.76 | |
| Far left | Bertrand Royer | 1,250 | 2.63 | |
| GE | Anita Poupeau-Bouthier | 1,212 | 2.55 | |
| DVD | Martine De Rautlin de la Roy | 1,193 | 2.51 | |
| Others | N/A | 1,207 | | |
| Turnout | | 50,383 | 70.17 | |
2nd round result
| PS | Alain Claeys | 28,716 | 57.05 | |
| UDF | Eric Duboc | 21,620 | 42.95 | |
| Turnout | | 53,090 | 73.94 | |
| PS gain from UDF | | | | |
