= Léonore Moncond'huy =

French politician (born 1990)

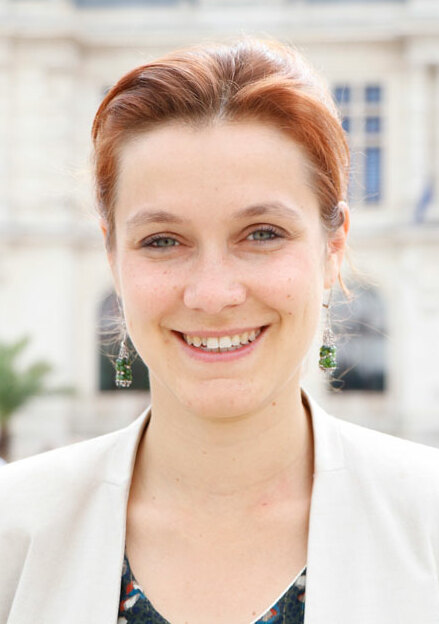
- Moncond'huy in 2020

Mayor of Poitiers
- Incumbent
- Assumed office 3 July 2020
- Preceded by: Alain Claeys

Personal details
- Born: 3 April 1990 (age 36)
- Party: The Ecologists

Léonore Moncond'huy (born 3 April 1990) is a French politician of The Ecologists. Since 2020, she has served as mayor of Poitiers. From 2015 to 2020, she was a member of the Regional Council of Nouvelle-Aquitaine. She has served as vice president of Grand Poitiers since 2020.
