= Liniers (disambiguation) =

Liniers may refer to:

- Liniers, a barrio (neighborhood) of Buenos Aires, Argentina
- Liniers, Vienne, a commune in the Vienne department, France
- Santiago de Liniers, 1st Count of Buenos Aires, a French officer in Spanish service, viceroy of the Spanish colony of Río de la Plata
- Liniers (cartoonist), an Argentine cartoonist
