= Saint-Julien-l'Ars =

- Commune
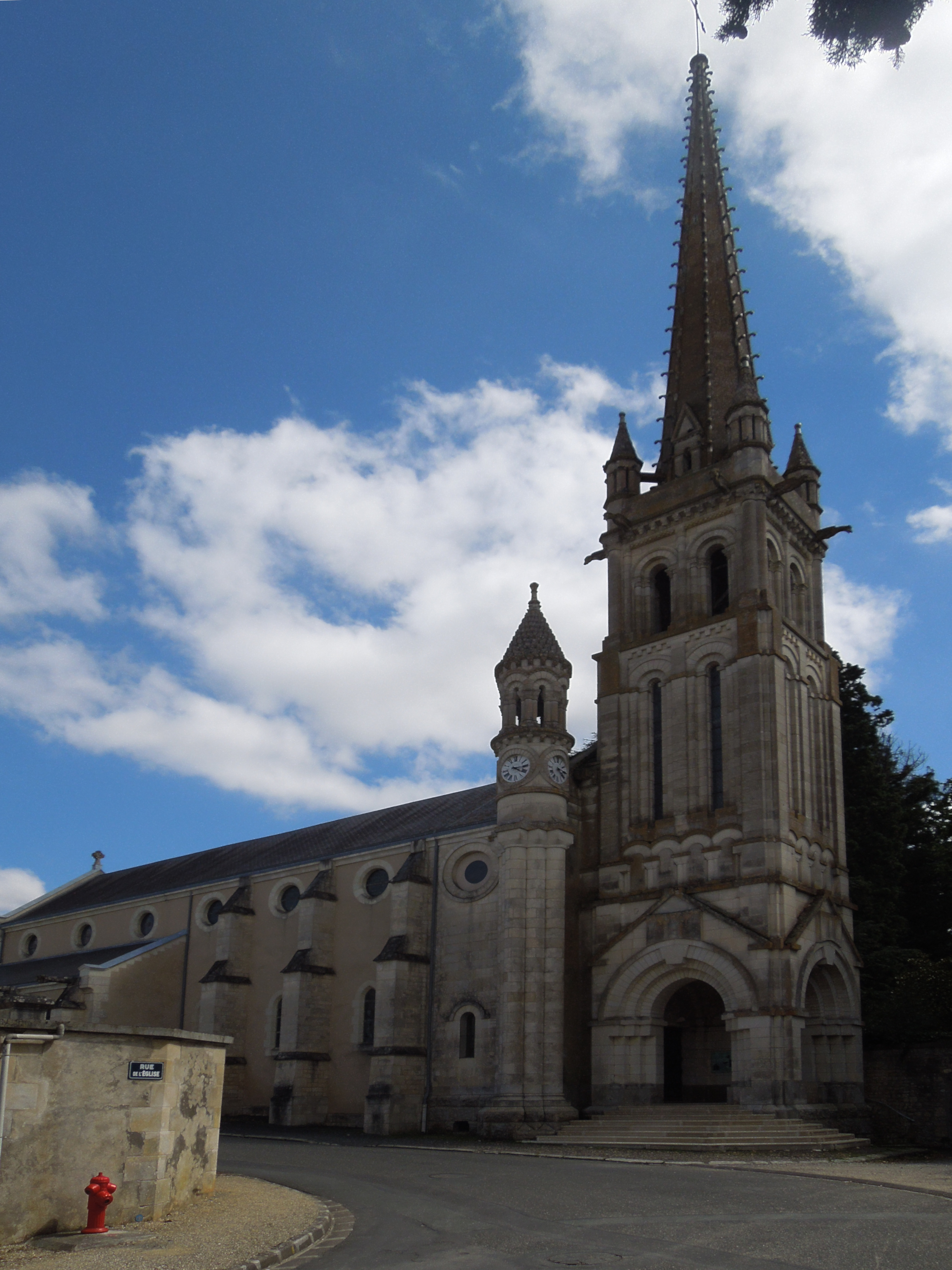
- The church in St. Julien l'Ars

- Coat of arms
- Location of Saint-Julien-l'Ars
- Location within France Location within Nouvelle-Aquitaine
- Coordinates: 46°33′34″N 0°30′39″E
- Country: France
- Region: Nouvelle-Aquitaine
- Department: Vienne
- Arrondissement: Poitiers
- Canton: Chasseneuil-du-Poitou
- Intercommunality: CU Grand Poitiers

Government
  - Mayor (2021–2026): Béatrice Vanneste
- Area^{1}: 18.46 km^{2} (7.13 sq mi)
- Elevation: 120 m (390 ft)
- Highest elevation: 130 m (430 ft)
- Lowest elevation: 104 m (341 ft)
- Population (2023): 2,880
  - Density: 156/km^{2} (404/sq mi)
- Time zone: UTC+01:00 (CET)
  - Summer (DST): UTC+02:00 (CEST)
- INSEE/Postal code: 86226 /86800
- ^{1} French Land Register data, which excludes lakes, ponds, glaciers > 1 km^{2} (0.386 sq mi or 247 acres) and river estuaries.

Saint-Julien-l'Ars is a commune in the Vienne department in the Nouvelle-Aquitaine region in west-central France.

== Geography ==
The climate is oceanic with temperate summers.

== Population ==
The inhabitants are called Sacto-Julianais in French.

Historical population
Year	Pop.	±% p.a.
1968	1,234	—
1975	1,432	+2.15%
1982	1,724	+2.69%
1990	1,903	+1.24%
1999	2,061	+0.89%
2007	2,212	+0.89%
2012	2,447	+2.04%
2017	2,660	+1.68%
2023	2,880	+1.33%
Source: INSEE

== History ==
The town of Saint-Julien-l'Ars is located on D951 nine miles east of Poitiers' town center. Traces of occupation dating from the Gallo-Roman period were found there (vestiges of workshops, a sculpted head, etc.). A Merovingian cemetery was found in the proximity of the church.

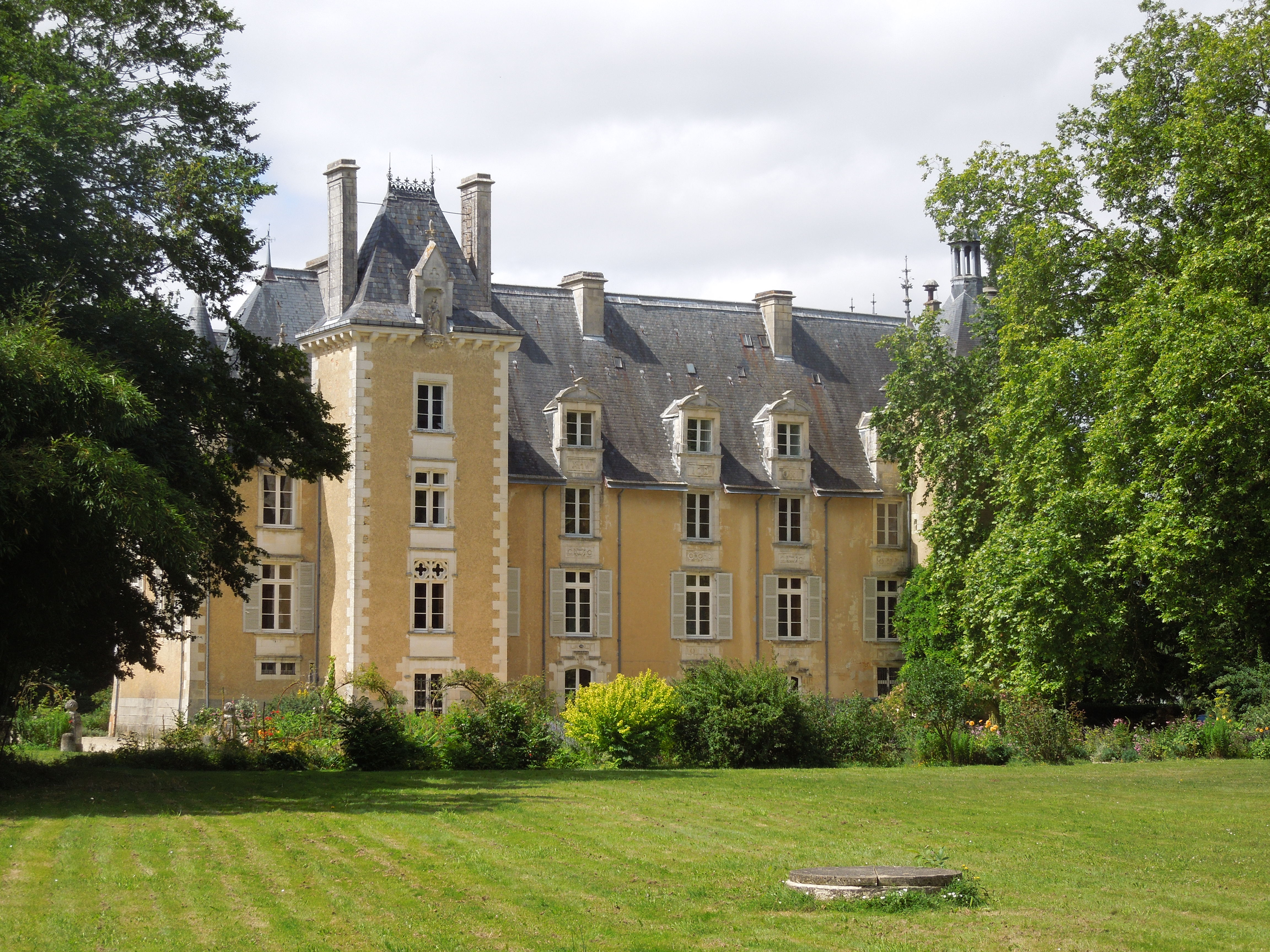
The Chateau in Saint Julien

Owned by the Counts of Poitiers, it was granted to Trinity Abby of Poitiers in 964, which gave it as a fief to the Cléret family who built the château originally as a Keep near Roman cross roads and on the ruins of an old Roman castrum and kept the estate until 1687. Chateau St. Julien l'Ars still stands after extensive renovations done in the 1860s by Robert de Beauchamp. The estate is now owned and operated as a destination wedding venue by the Gubelman family who acquired the estate in 2001.

Before 1790, Saint-Julien-l'Ars was part of the Archparish (Note: This is a translation of the French term "archiprêtré" which refers to a level in the Roman Catholic hierarchy which is between a parish and diocese. See the French Wikipedia page Archiprêtré.) of Morthemer, Castellany and Bailiwick of Poitiers.

Saint-Julien-l'Ars welcomed the progress of the French Revolution and planted the Tree of Freedom to symbolize it. It became the rallying point for all the major festivals and events related to the revolution including the anniversary of the execution of King Louis XVI.

Following the decree of the National Convention of 25 Vendémiaire Year II (16 October 1793), communes with names that reflected royalty, feudalism or superstition were invited to change their names; thus the commune's name was changed to La Reunion.

Saint-Julien-l'Ars merged with the commune of Savigny-l'Evescault on 10 November 1819. It returned to being a separate commune on 12 January 1870.

Saint-Julien-l'Ars Station was commissioned on 18 June 1883 by the State, to exploit the Mignaloux-Nouaille-to-Chauvigny section of the Saint-Benoît-to-Blanc rail line.

== See also ==
- Communes of the Vienne department
