= Arnaudeau =

Arnaudeau is a French surname. Notable people with the surname include:

- Eugène Arnaudeau (1821–1891), French general and politician
- Henri Arnaudeau (1922–1987), French international football player
- Jean-Marie Arnaudeau, Mayor of Foussais-Payré (2016–2026)
