= Bonneuil-Matours =

- Commune
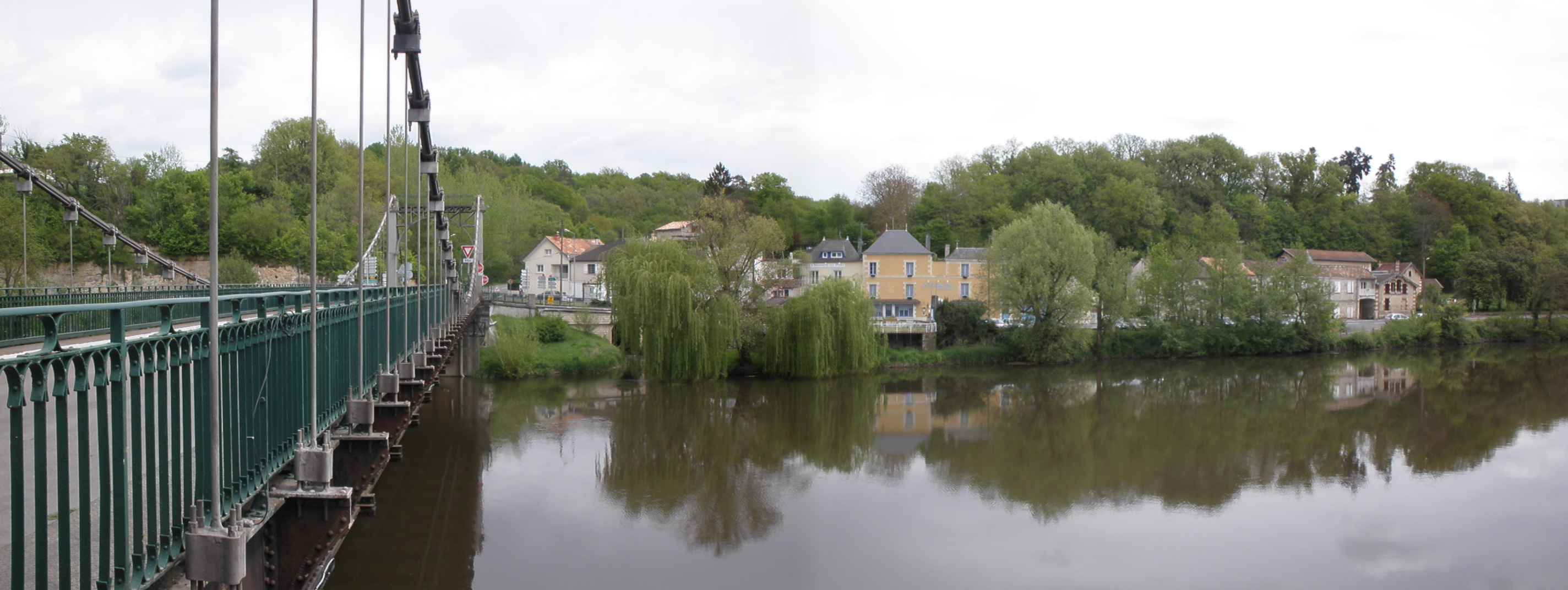
- The bridge in Bonneuil-Matours
- Location of Bonneuil-Matours
- Location within France Location within Nouvelle-Aquitaine
- Coordinates: 46°40′57″N 0°34′17″E
- Country: France
- Region: Nouvelle-Aquitaine
- Department: Vienne
- Arrondissement: Châtellerault
- Canton: Chauvigny
- Intercommunality: CA Grand Châtellerault

Government
  - Mayor (2020–2026): Franck Bonnard
- Area^{1}: 42.8 km^{2} (16.5 sq mi)
- Elevation: 57 m (187 ft)
- Highest elevation: 141 m (463 ft)
- Lowest elevation: 51 m (167 ft)
- Population (2023): 2,081
  - Density: 48.6/km^{2} (126/sq mi)
- Time zone: UTC+01:00 (CET)
  - Summer (DST): UTC+02:00 (CEST)
- INSEE/Postal code: 86032 /86210
- ^{1} French Land Register data, which excludes lakes, ponds, glaciers > 1 km^{2} (0.386 sq mi or 247 acres) and river estuaries.

Bonneuil-Matours (French pronunciation: [bɔnœj matuʁ]) is a commune in the Vienne department in the Nouvelle-Aquitaine region in western France.

== Population ==
Historical population
Year	Pop.	±% p.a.
1968	1,147	—
1975	1,236	+1.07%
1982	1,510	+2.90%
1990	1,642	+1.05%
1999	1,708	+0.44%
2007	1,963	+1.75%
2012	2,082	+1.18%
2017	2,104	+0.21%
2023	2,081	−0.18%
Source: INSEE

== See also ==
- Communes of the Vienne department
