= Leignes-sur-Fontaine =

- Commune
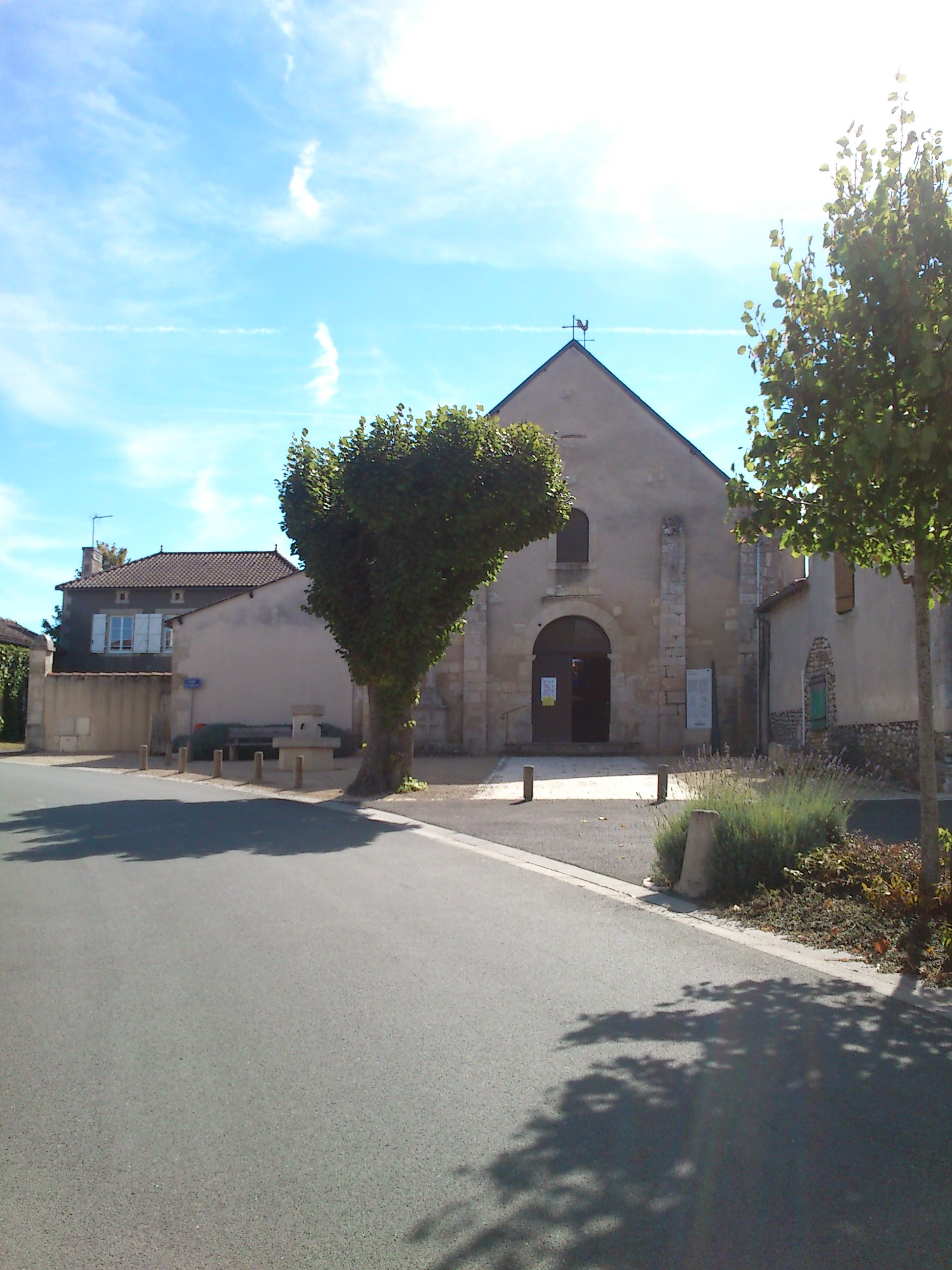
- The church in Leignes-sur-Fontaine
- Location of Leignes-sur-Fontaine
- Location within France Location within Nouvelle-Aquitaine
- Coordinates: 46°30′24″N 0°46′40″E
- Country: France
- Region: Nouvelle-Aquitaine
- Department: Vienne
- Arrondissement: Montmorillon
- Canton: Chauvigny

Government
  - Mayor (2024–2026): Christian Heng
- Area^{1}: 32.37 km^{2} (12.50 sq mi)
- Elevation: 150 m (490 ft)
- Highest elevation: 157 m (515 ft)
- Lowest elevation: 82 m (269 ft)
- Population (2023): 647
  - Density: 20.0/km^{2} (51.8/sq mi)
- Time zone: UTC+01:00 (CET)
  - Summer (DST): UTC+02:00 (CEST)
- INSEE/Postal code: 86126 /86300
- ^{1} French Land Register data, which excludes lakes, ponds, glaciers > 1 km^{2} (0.386 sq mi or 247 acres) and river estuaries.

Leignes-sur-Fontaine (French pronunciation: [lɛɲ syʁ fɔ̃tɛn]) is a commune in the Vienne department in the Nouvelle-Aquitaine region in western France.

== See also ==
- Communes of the Vienne department
