= Paizay-le-Sec =

- Commune
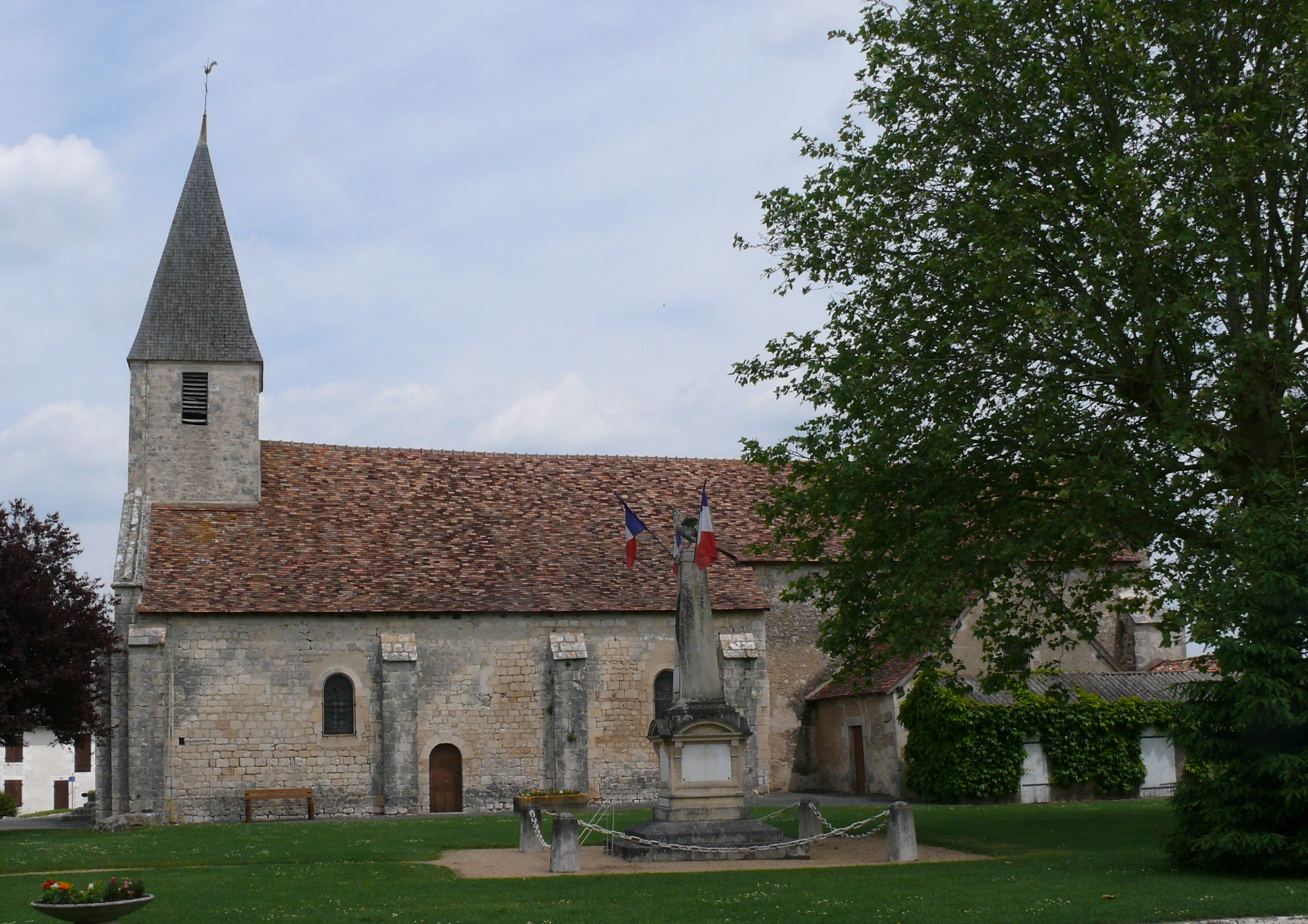
- The church of Saint-Hilaire, in Paizay-le-Sec
- Location of Paizay-le-Sec
- Location within France Location within Nouvelle-Aquitaine
- Coordinates: 46°34′47″N 0°46′42″E
- Country: France
- Region: Nouvelle-Aquitaine
- Department: Vienne
- Arrondissement: Montmorillon
- Canton: Chauvigny

Government
  - Mayor (2020–2026): Jacques de Crémiers
- Area^{1}: 34.65 km^{2} (13.38 sq mi)
- Elevation: 133 m (436 ft)
- Highest elevation: 143 m (469 ft)
- Lowest elevation: 113 m (371 ft)
- Population (2023): 468
  - Density: 13.5/km^{2} (35.0/sq mi)
- Time zone: UTC+01:00 (CET)
  - Summer (DST): UTC+02:00 (CEST)
- INSEE/Postal code: 86187 /86300
- ^{1} French Land Register data, which excludes lakes, ponds, glaciers > 1 km^{2} (0.386 sq mi or 247 acres) and river estuaries.

Paizay-le-Sec (French pronunciation: [pɛzɛ lə sɛk]) is a commune in the Vienne department in the Nouvelle-Aquitaine region in western France.

== See also ==
- Communes of the Vienne department
