= Monthoiron =

- Commune
- Location of Monthoiron
- Location within France Location within Nouvelle-Aquitaine
- Coordinates: 46°44′03″N 0°37′16″E
- Country: France
- Region: Nouvelle-Aquitaine
- Department: Vienne
- Arrondissement: Châtellerault
- Canton: Chauvigny
- Intercommunality: CA Grand Châtellerault

Government
  - Mayor (2020–2026): Patrice Azile
- Area^{1}: 16.66 km^{2} (6.43 sq mi)
- Elevation: 130 m (430 ft)
- Highest elevation: 141 m (463 ft)
- Lowest elevation: 63 m (207 ft)
- Population (2023): 673
  - Density: 40.4/km^{2} (105/sq mi)
- Time zone: UTC+01:00 (CET)
  - Summer (DST): UTC+02:00 (CEST)
- INSEE/Postal code: 86164 /86210
- ^{1} French Land Register data, which excludes lakes, ponds, glaciers > 1 km^{2} (0.386 sq mi or 247 acres) and river estuaries.

Monthoiron (French pronunciation: [mɔ̃twaʁɔ̃]) is a commune in the Vienne department in the Nouvelle-Aquitaine region in western France.

== Demographics ==
Historical population
Year	Pop.	±% p.a.
1968	393	—
1975	366	−1.01%
1982	564	+6.37%
1990	609	+0.96%
1999	588	−0.39%
2007	638	+1.03%
2012	689	+1.55%
2017	662	−0.80%
2023	673	+0.28%
Source: INSEE

== See also ==
- Communes of the Vienne department
