= Montamisé =

- Commune
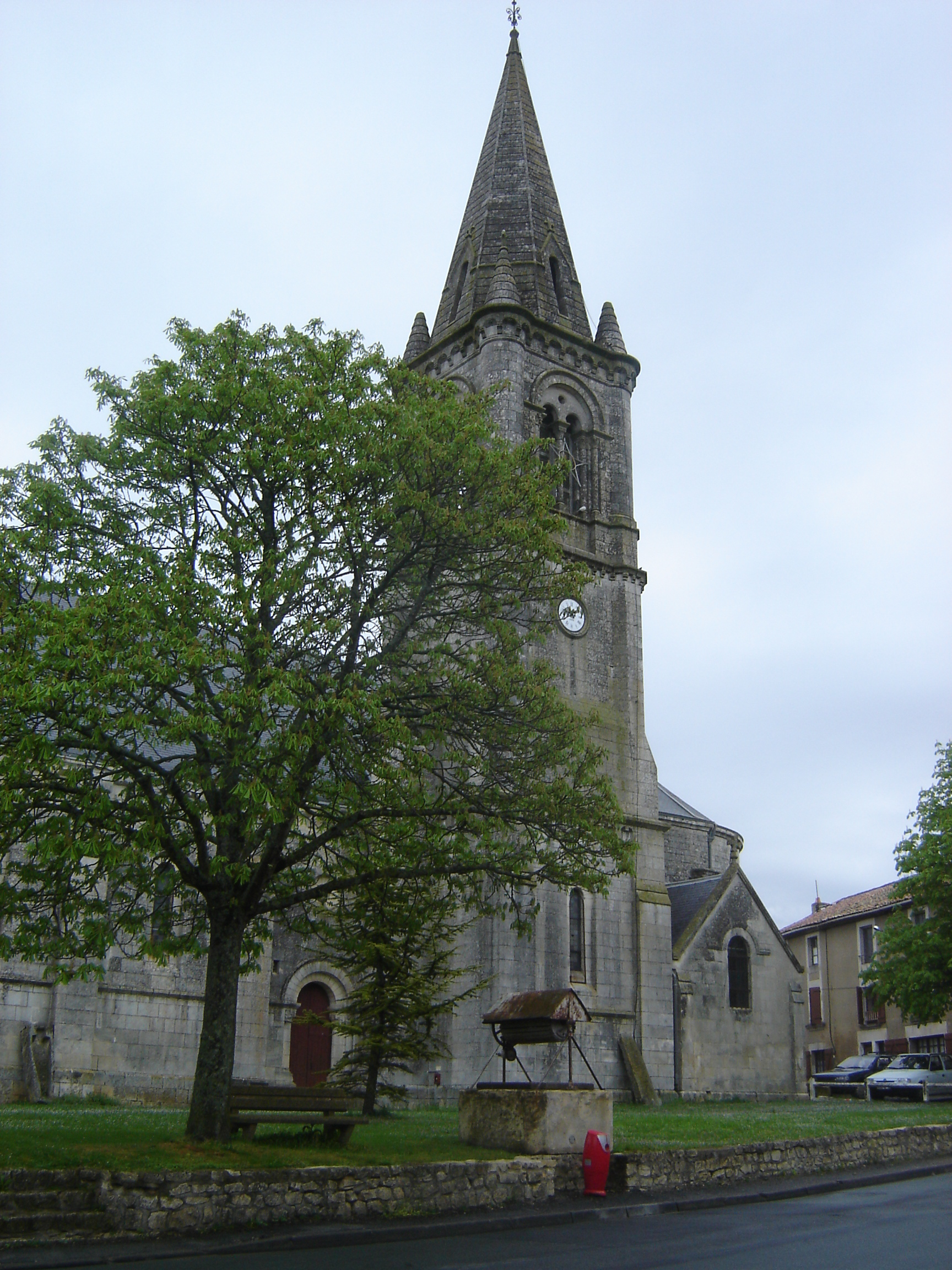
- Church of Notre Dame
- Location of Montamisé
- Location within France Location within Nouvelle-Aquitaine
- Coordinates: 46°37′18″N 0°25′29″E
- Country: France
- Region: Nouvelle-Aquitaine
- Department: Vienne
- Arrondissement: Poitiers
- Canton: Chasseneuil-du-Poitou
- Intercommunality: CU Grand Poitiers

Government
  - Mayor (2020–2026): Corine Sauvage
- Area^{1}: 31.71 km^{2} (12.24 sq mi)
- Elevation: 210 m (690 ft)
- Highest elevation: 144 m (472 ft)
- Lowest elevation: 66 m (217 ft)
- Population (2023): 3,723
  - Density: 117.4/km^{2} (304.1/sq mi)
- Time zone: UTC+01:00 (CET)
  - Summer (DST): UTC+02:00 (CEST)
- INSEE/Postal code: 86163 /86360
- ^{1} French Land Register data, which excludes lakes, ponds, glaciers > 1 km^{2} (0.386 sq mi or 247 acres) and river estuaries.

Montamisé (French pronunciation: [mɔ̃tamize]) is a commune in the Vienne department in the Nouvelle-Aquitaine region in western France.

== Population ==
Historical population
Year	Pop.	±% p.a.
1968	961	—
1975	1,300	+4.41%
1982	1,787	+4.65%
1990	2,164	+2.42%
1999	2,615	+2.13%
2007	3,031	+1.86%
2012	3,352	+2.03%
2017	3,630	+1.61%
2023	3,723	+0.42%
Source: INSEE

== See also ==
- Communes of the Vienne department
