= Bellefonds =

- Commune
- Location of Bellefonds
- Location within France Location within Nouvelle-Aquitaine
- Coordinates: 46°38′50″N 0°35′32″E
- Country: France
- Region: Nouvelle-Aquitaine
- Department: Vienne
- Arrondissement: Châtellerault
- Canton: Chauvigny
- Intercommunality: CA Grand Châtellerault

Government
  - Mayor (2020–2026): Bernard Heneau
- Area^{1}: 8.5 km^{2} (3.3 sq mi)
- Elevation: 60 m (200 ft)
- Highest elevation: 138 m (453 ft)
- Lowest elevation: 55 m (180 ft)
- Population (2023): 247
  - Density: 29/km^{2} (75/sq mi)
- Time zone: UTC+01:00 (CET)
  - Summer (DST): UTC+02:00 (CEST)
- INSEE/Postal code: 86020 /86210
- ^{1} French Land Register data, which excludes lakes, ponds, glaciers > 1 km^{2} (0.386 sq mi or 247 acres) and river estuaries.

Bellefonds (French pronunciation: [bɛlfɔ̃]) is a commune in the Vienne department in the Nouvelle-Aquitaine region in western France.

== See also ==
- Communes of the Vienne department
