= Lauthiers =

- Commune
- Location of Lauthiers
- Location within France Location within Nouvelle-Aquitaine
- Coordinates: 46°36′08″N 0°44′07″E
- Country: France
- Region: Nouvelle-Aquitaine
- Department: Vienne
- Arrondissement: Montmorillon
- Canton: Chauvigny

Government
  - Mayor (2020–2026): Olivier Couradeau
- Area^{1}: 8.16 km^{2} (3.15 sq mi)
- Elevation: 142 m (466 ft)
- Highest elevation: 141 m (463 ft)
- Lowest elevation: 117 m (384 ft)
- Population (2023): 68
  - Density: 8.3/km^{2} (22/sq mi)
- Time zone: UTC+01:00 (CET)
  - Summer (DST): UTC+02:00 (CEST)
- INSEE/Postal code: 86122 /86300
- ^{1} French Land Register data, which excludes lakes, ponds, glaciers > 1 km^{2} (0.386 sq mi or 247 acres) and river estuaries.

Lauthiers (French pronunciation: [lotje]) is a commune in the Vienne department in the Nouvelle-Aquitaine region in western France.

== See also ==
- Communes of the Vienne department
