= Fleix =

- Commune
- Location of Fleix
- Location within France Location within Nouvelle-Aquitaine
- Coordinates: 46°33′20″N 0°44′47″E
- Country: France
- Region: Nouvelle-Aquitaine
- Department: Vienne
- Arrondissement: Montmorillon
- Canton: Chauvigny

Government
  - Mayor (2020–2026): Maryvonne Galbois
- Area^{1}: 9.15 km^{2} (3.53 sq mi)
- Elevation: 35 m (115 ft)
- Highest elevation: 144 m (472 ft)
- Lowest elevation: 112 m (367 ft)
- Population (2023): 143
  - Density: 15.6/km^{2} (40.5/sq mi)
- Time zone: UTC+01:00 (CET)
  - Summer (DST): UTC+02:00 (CEST)
- INSEE/Postal code: 86098 /86300
- ^{1} French Land Register data, which excludes lakes, ponds, glaciers > 1 km^{2} (0.386 sq mi or 247 acres) and river estuaries.

Fleix is a commune in the Vienne department in the Nouvelle-Aquitaine region in western France.

== See also ==
- Communes of the Vienne department
