= Jardres =

- Commune
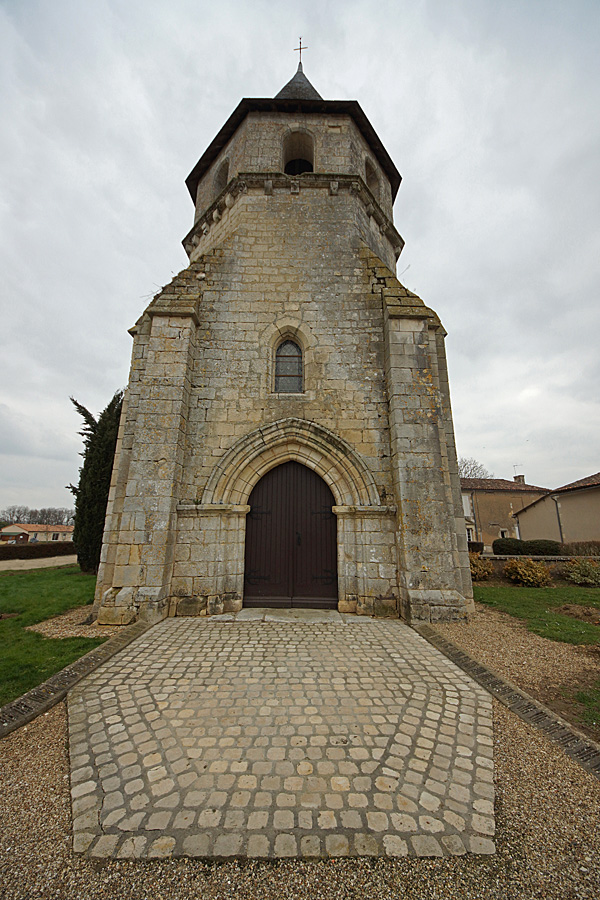
- The church of Saint-Hilaire, in Jardres
- Location of Jardres
- Location within France Location within Nouvelle-Aquitaine
- Coordinates: 46°34′11″N 0°33′57″E
- Country: France
- Region: Nouvelle-Aquitaine
- Department: Vienne
- Arrondissement: Poitiers
- Canton: Chasseneuil-du-Poitou
- Intercommunality: CU Grand Poitiers

Government
  - Mayor (2020–2026): Jean-Luc Maerten
- Area^{1}: 20.74 km^{2} (8.01 sq mi)
- Elevation: 118 m (387 ft)
- Highest elevation: 133 m (436 ft)
- Lowest elevation: 80 m (260 ft)
- Population (2023): 1,250
  - Density: 60.3/km^{2} (156/sq mi)
- Time zone: UTC+01:00 (CET)
  - Summer (DST): UTC+02:00 (CEST)
- INSEE/Postal code: 86114 /86800
- ^{1} French Land Register data, which excludes lakes, ponds, glaciers > 1 km^{2} (0.386 sq mi or 247 acres) and river estuaries.

Jardres (French pronunciation: [ʒaʁdʁ]) is a commune in the Vienne department in the Nouvelle-Aquitaine region in western France.

== See also ==
- Communes of the Vienne department
