= Availles-en-Châtellerault =

- Commune
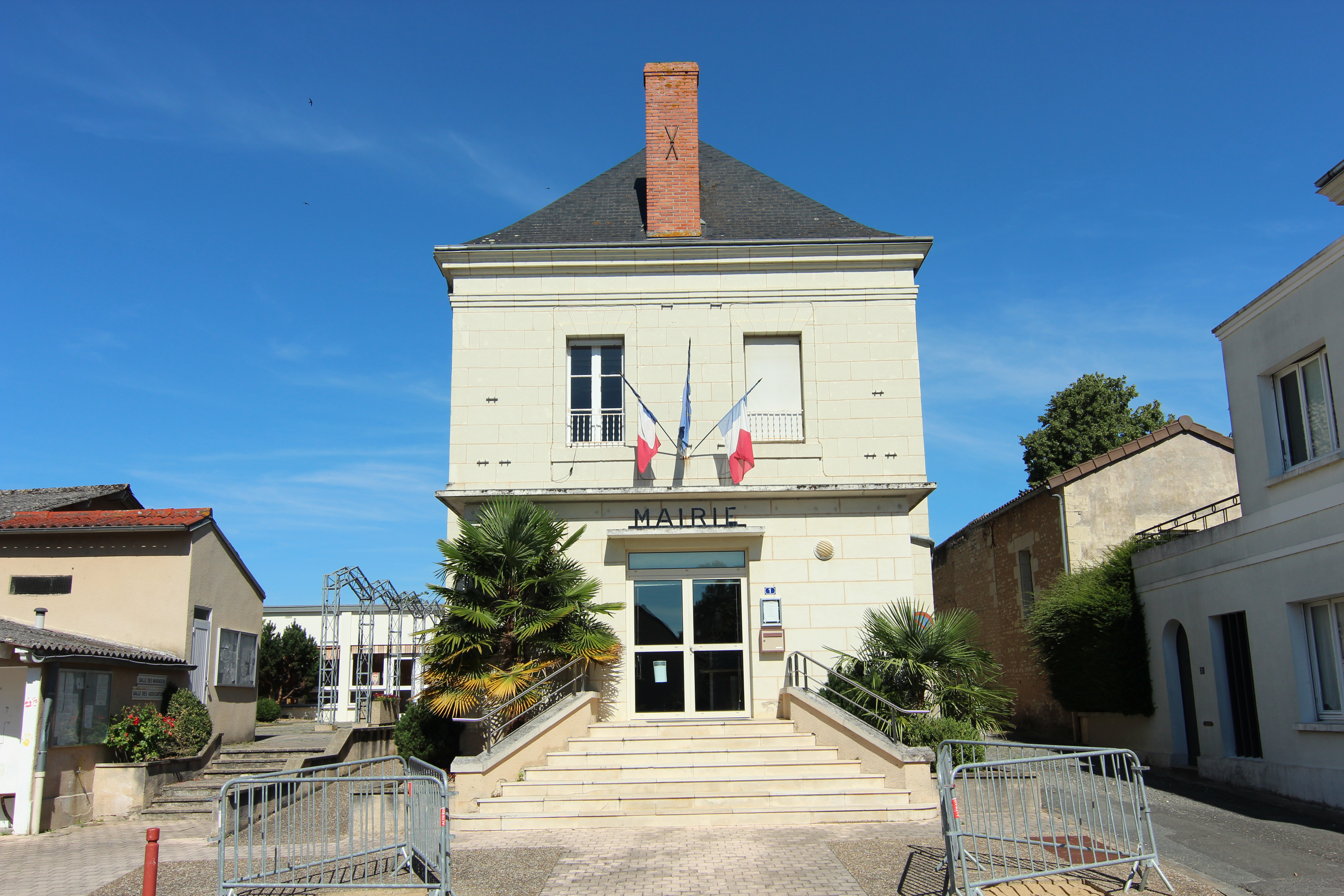
- Town hall
- Location of Availles-en-Châtellerault
- Location within France Location within Nouvelle-Aquitaine
- Coordinates: 46°45′20″N 0°34′48″E
- Country: France
- Region: Nouvelle-Aquitaine
- Department: Vienne
- Arrondissement: Châtellerault
- Canton: Chauvigny
- Intercommunality: CA Grand Châtellerault

Government
  - Mayor (2020–2026): Bernard Biet
- Area^{1}: 15.46 km^{2} (5.97 sq mi)
- Elevation: 70 m (230 ft)
- Highest elevation: 135 m (443 ft)
- Lowest elevation: 47 m (154 ft)
- Population (2023): 1,730
  - Density: 112/km^{2} (290/sq mi)
- Time zone: UTC+01:00 (CET)
  - Summer (DST): UTC+02:00 (CEST)
- INSEE/Postal code: 86014 /86530
- ^{1} French Land Register data, which excludes lakes, ponds, glaciers > 1 km^{2} (0.386 sq mi or 247 acres) and river estuaries.

Availles-en-Châtellerault (French pronunciation: [avaj ɑ̃ ʃatɛlʁo]) is a commune in the Vienne department in the Nouvelle-Aquitaine region in western France.

== See also ==
- Communes of the Vienne department
