= Sainte-Radégonde =

- Commune
- Location of Sainte-Radégonde
- Location within France Location within Nouvelle-Aquitaine
- Coordinates: 46°38′08″N 0°42′10″E
- Country: France
- Region: Nouvelle-Aquitaine
- Department: Vienne
- Arrondissement: Montmorillon
- Canton: Chauvigny
- Intercommunality: CU Grand Poitiers

Government
  - Mayor (2022–2026): Valerie Rougeon
- Area^{1}: 13.18 km^{2} (5.09 sq mi)
- Elevation: 210 m (690 ft)
- Highest elevation: 138 m (453 ft)
- Lowest elevation: 100 m (330 ft)
- Population (2023): 187
  - Density: 14.2/km^{2} (36.7/sq mi)
- Time zone: UTC+01:00 (CET)
  - Summer (DST): UTC+02:00 (CEST)
- INSEE/Postal code: 86239 /86300
- ^{1} French Land Register data, which excludes lakes, ponds, glaciers > 1 km^{2} (0.386 sq mi or 247 acres) and river estuaries.

Sainte-Radégonde (French pronunciation: [sɛ̃t ʁadeɡɔ̃d]) is a commune in the Vienne department in the Nouvelle-Aquitaine region in western France.

== See also ==
- Communes of the Vienne department
