= Bignoux =

- Commune
- Location of Bignoux
- Location within France Location within Nouvelle-Aquitaine
- Coordinates: 46°36′00″N 0°28′14″E
- Country: France
- Region: Nouvelle-Aquitaine
- Department: Vienne
- Arrondissement: Poitiers
- Canton: Chasseneuil-du-Poitou
- Intercommunality: CU Grand Poitiers

Government
  - Mayor (2020–2026): Emmanuel Bazile
- Area^{1}: 14.52 km^{2} (5.61 sq mi)
- Highest elevation: 131 m (430 ft)
- Lowest elevation: 92 m (302 ft)
- Population (2023): 1,087
  - Density: 74.86/km^{2} (193.9/sq mi)
- Time zone: UTC+01:00 (CET)
  - Summer (DST): UTC+02:00 (CEST)
- INSEE/Postal code: 86028 /86800
- ^{1} French Land Register data, which excludes lakes, ponds, glaciers > 1 km^{2} (0.386 sq mi or 247 acres) and river estuaries.

Bignoux (French pronunciation: [biɲu]) is a commune in the Vienne department in the Nouvelle-Aquitaine region in western France.

== See also ==
- Communes of the Vienne department
