= Eugène Arnaudeau =

French army officer

Eugène Jean Marie Arnaudeau
- General Eugène Arnaudeau
- Born: 8 September 1821; Laon, Aisne, France
- Died: 3 May 1891 (aged 69); Sèvres-Anxaumont, Vienne, France
- Occupation: Major General
- Known for: Senator

Eugène Jean Marie Arnaudeau (8 September 1821 – 3 May 1891) was a French army officer who later became a Senator of the Third Republic.

== Birth and military career ==
Eugène Jean Marie Arnaudeau was born on 8 September 1821 in Sèvres-Anxaumont, Vienne. He graduated from the Ecole polytechnique and became an officer of the engineers. He advanced steadily through the ranks of the army, becoming sub-lieutenant in 1843, lieutenant in 1845, captain in 1849, battalion commander on 17 January 1855 and lieutenant colonel on 21 January 1860. In 1861 he married Marie-Félicité Creuzé.

Arnaudeau was promoted to colonel on 16 May 1863 and brigadier general of the infantry on 27 February 1868. His first campaigns were in Africa. On 7 June 1865 he was made a Commander of the Legion of Honour. During the Franco-Prussian War (19 July 1870 – 10 May 1871) he commanded a brigade in the 3rd Corps under Bazaine. After this he commanded the Angoulême brigade. He was made a divisional general on 30 December 1875 and commanded the 16th Infantry Division, including the subdivisions from Cosne, Bourges and Nevers.

== Political career ==
In 1877 Arnaudeau was Conservative candidate in the senatorial by-election for Vienne that followed the death of Louis Olivier Bourbeau, former Minister of Education. He was elected on 2 December 1877. He sat on the right and voted with the Conservatives. He was reelected on 8 January 1882. He made his last speech in 1889 during the debate over the amnesty law. Arnaudeau failed to be reelected to the Senate on 4 January 1891, and retired.

== Home town ==
Arnaudeau owned the property of "La Brunetière" in Sèvres-Anxaumont, Vienne. While in the military he used his leave periods to improve the mansion, adding a tower from which he could use powerful binoculars to watch the military maneuvers at Poitiers. In 1876 he erected a building in Sèvres to hold the town hall, school and teacher's residence, with a garden. He was made Mayor of Sèvres in 1888. He undertook agricultural experiments, trying to apply scientific concepts of the age. These included applying lime to the land, and a lime kiln still exists at Sèvres today. He died there on 3 May 1891. With no descendants, he left all his property to the commune.
