= Archigny =

- Commune
- Coat of arms
- Location of Archigny
- Location within France Location within Nouvelle-Aquitaine
- Coordinates: 46°40′27″N 0°39′09″E
- Country: France
- Region: Nouvelle-Aquitaine
- Department: Vienne
- Arrondissement: Châtellerault
- Canton: Chauvigny
- Intercommunality: CA Grand Châtellerault

Government
  - Mayor (2020–2026): Jacky Roy
- Area^{1}: 66.68 km^{2} (25.75 sq mi)
- Elevation: 120 m (390 ft)
- Highest elevation: 141 m (463 ft)
- Lowest elevation: 72 m (236 ft)
- Population (2023): 1,058
  - Density: 15.87/km^{2} (41.09/sq mi)
- Time zone: UTC+01:00 (CET)
  - Summer (DST): UTC+02:00 (CEST)
- INSEE/Postal code: 86009 /86210
- ^{1} French Land Register data, which excludes lakes, ponds, glaciers > 1 km^{2} (0.386 sq mi or 247 acres) and river estuaries.

Archigny (French pronunciation: [aʁʃiɲi]) is a commune in the Vienne department in the Nouvelle-Aquitaine region in western France.

== See also ==
- Communes of the Vienne department
