= Pouillé, Vienne =

Pouillé
- Commune
- Location of Pouillé
- Location within France Location within Nouvelle-Aquitaine
- Coordinates: 46°32′15″N 0°34′39″E
- Country: France
- Region: Nouvelle-Aquitaine
- Department: Vienne
- Arrondissement: Poitiers
- Canton: Chasseneuil-du-Poitou
- Intercommunality: CU Grand Poitiers

Government
  - Mayor (2020–2026): Pascale Guittet
- Area^{1}: 13.96 km^{2} (5.39 sq mi)
- Elevation: 133 m (436 ft)
- Highest elevation: 137 m (449 ft)
- Lowest elevation: 105 m (344 ft)
- Population (2023): 735
  - Density: 52.7/km^{2} (136/sq mi)
- Time zone: UTC+01:00 (CET)
  - Summer (DST): UTC+02:00 (CEST)
- INSEE/Postal code: 86198 /86800
- ^{1} French Land Register data, which excludes lakes, ponds, glaciers > 1 km^{2} (0.386 sq mi or 247 acres) and river estuaries.

Pouillé (French pronunciation: [puje]) is a commune in the Vienne department in the Nouvelle-Aquitaine region in western France.

== See also ==
- Communes of the Vienne department
