= Ligugé =

- Commune
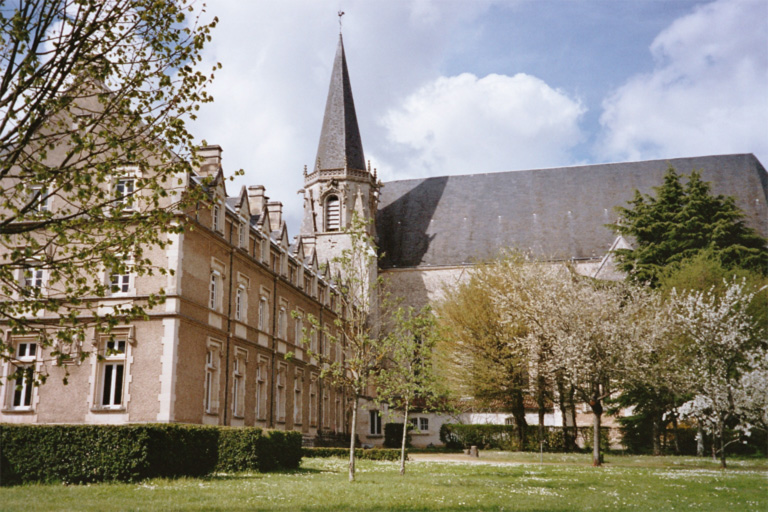
- Saint-Martin's Abbey
- Location of Ligugé
- Location within France Location within Nouvelle-Aquitaine
- Coordinates: 46°31′08″N 0°19′50″E
- Country: France
- Region: Nouvelle-Aquitaine
- Department: Vienne
- Arrondissement: Poitiers
- Canton: Poitiers-5
- Intercommunality: CU Grand Poitiers

Government
  - Mayor (2020–2026): Bernard Mauze
- Area^{1}: 22.77 km^{2} (8.79 sq mi)
- Elevation: 89 m (292 ft)
- Highest elevation: 149 m (489 ft)
- Lowest elevation: 72 m (236 ft)
- Population (2023): 3,444
  - Density: 151.3/km^{2} (391.7/sq mi)
- Time zone: UTC+01:00 (CET)
  - Summer (DST): UTC+02:00 (CEST)
- INSEE/Postal code: 86133 /86240
- ^{1} French Land Register data, which excludes lakes, ponds, glaciers > 1 km^{2} (0.386 sq mi or 247 acres) and river estuaries.

Ligugé (French pronunciation: [liɡyʒe]) is a commune in the Vienne department in the Nouvelle-Aquitaine region in western France.

It is located on the River Clain, 8 kilometres (5 miles) south of Poitiers. It is known for its historic monastery, Ligugé Abbey.

== Twin towns – sister cities ==
Ligugé is twinned with:

- Sonning, United Kingdom

== Population ==
Historical population
Year	Pop.	±% p.a.
1968	1,675	—
1975	2,206	+4.01%
1982	2,700	+2.93%
1990	2,771	+0.32%
1999	2,817	+0.18%
2007	2,880	+0.28%
2012	3,140	+1.74%
2017	3,349	+1.30%
2023	3,444	+0.47%
Source: INSEE

== See also ==
- Communes of the Vienne department
