= La Chapelle-Moulière =

- Commune
- Location of La Chapelle-Moulière
- Location within France Location within Nouvelle-Aquitaine
- Coordinates: 46°39′00″N 0°33′56″E
- Country: France
- Region: Nouvelle-Aquitaine
- Department: Vienne
- Arrondissement: Poitiers
- Canton: Chasseneuil-du-Poitou
- Intercommunality: CU Grand Poitiers

Government
  - Mayor (2023–2026): Pierrick Giraud
- Area^{1}: 17.04 km^{2} (6.58 sq mi)
- Elevation: 123 m (404 ft)
- Highest elevation: 141 m (463 ft)
- Lowest elevation: 55 m (180 ft)
- Population (2023): 723
  - Density: 42.4/km^{2} (110/sq mi)
- Time zone: UTC+01:00 (CET)
  - Summer (DST): UTC+02:00 (CEST)
- INSEE/Postal code: 86058 /86210
- ^{1} French Land Register data, which excludes lakes, ponds, glaciers > 1 km^{2} (0.386 sq mi or 247 acres) and river estuaries.

La Chapelle-Moulière (French pronunciation: [la ʃapɛl muljɛʁ]) is a commune in the Vienne department in the Nouvelle-Aquitaine region in western France.

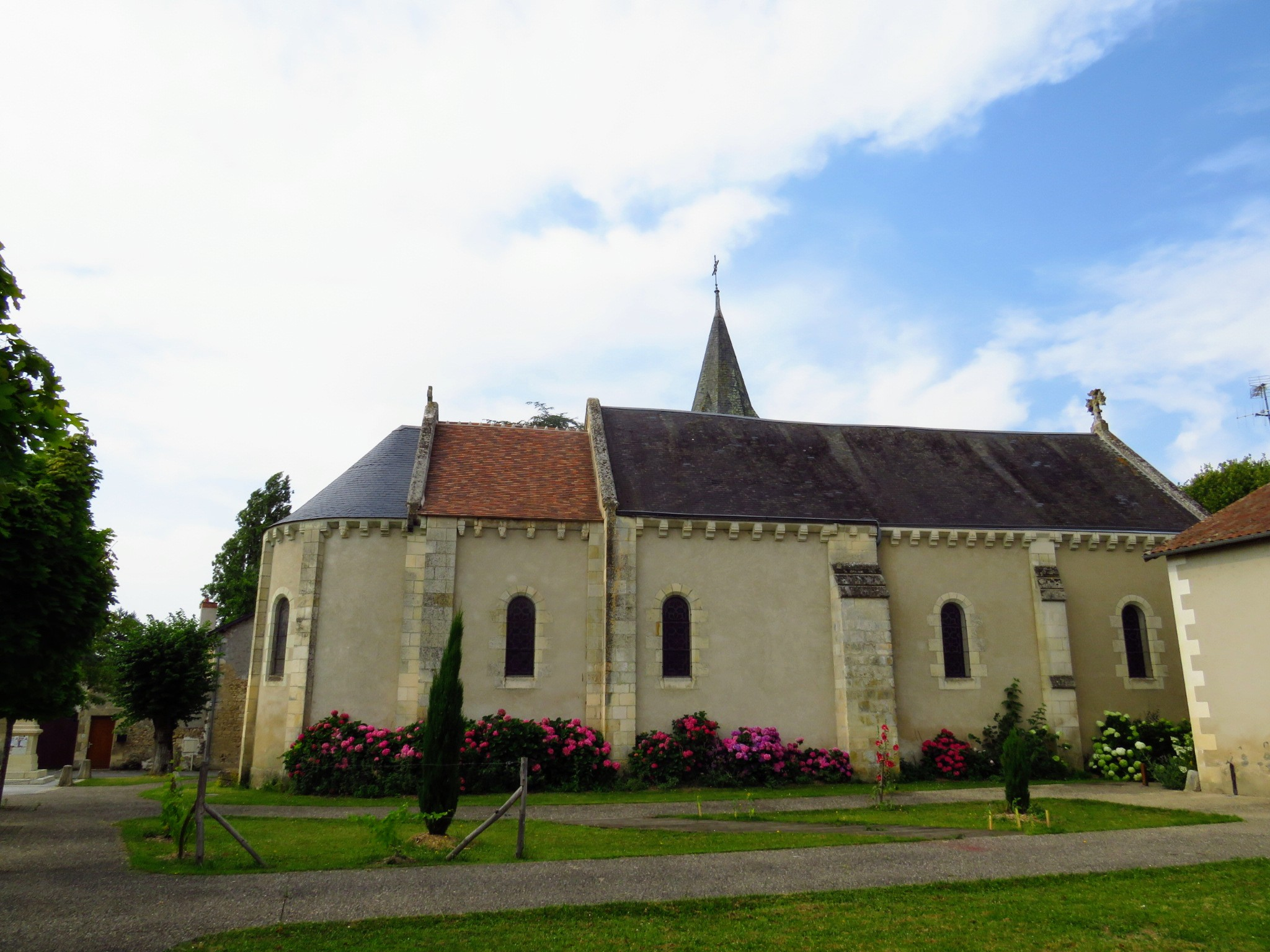
Église Sainte-Marie-Madeleine La Chapelle-Moulière

== See also ==
- Communes of the Vienne department
