= Chapelle-Viviers =

- Commune
- Location of Chapelle-Viviers
- Location within France Location within Nouvelle-Aquitaine
- Coordinates: 46°29′04″N 0°43′39″E
- Country: France
- Region: Nouvelle-Aquitaine
- Department: Vienne
- Arrondissement: Montmorillon
- Canton: Chauvigny

Government
  - Mayor (2020–2026): Patrick Charrier
- Area^{1}: 14.53 km^{2} (5.61 sq mi)
- Elevation: 165 m (541 ft)
- Highest elevation: 152 m (499 ft)
- Lowest elevation: 109 m (358 ft)
- Population (2023): 551
  - Density: 37.9/km^{2} (98.2/sq mi)
- Time zone: UTC+01:00 (CET)
  - Summer (DST): UTC+02:00 (CEST)
- INSEE/Postal code: 86059 /86300
- ^{1} French Land Register data, which excludes lakes, ponds, glaciers > 1 km^{2} (0.386 sq mi or 247 acres) and river estuaries.

Chapelle-Viviers (French pronunciation: [ʃapɛl vivje]) is a commune in the Vienne department in the Nouvelle-Aquitaine region in western France.

== History ==
The settlement is mentioned in the 10th century but in 1452 it is mentioned by a similar name to its current one. The present church dates from 1870. It was paid for by leading local families after the previous small church was going to ruin.

== See also ==
- Communes of the Vienne department
