= Savigny-Lévescault =

Savigny-Lévescault / Savigny-l'Évescault
- Commune
- Coat of arms
- Location of Savigny-Lévescault / Savigny-l'Évescault
- Location within France Location within Nouvelle-Aquitaine
- Coordinates: 46°32′11″N 0°28′41″E
- Country: France
- Region: Nouvelle-Aquitaine
- Department: Vienne
- Arrondissement: Poitiers
- Canton: Chasseneuil-du-Poitou
- Intercommunality: CU Grand Poitiers

Government
  - Mayor (2020–2026): Vincent Chenu
- Area^{1}: 22.14 km^{2} (8.55 sq mi)
- Elevation: 113 m (371 ft)
- Highest elevation: 137 m (449 ft)
- Lowest elevation: 106 m (348 ft)
- Population (2023): 1,240
  - Density: 56.0/km^{2} (145/sq mi)
- Time zone: UTC+01:00 (CET)
  - Summer (DST): UTC+02:00 (CEST)
- INSEE/Postal code: 86256 /86800
- ^{1} French Land Register data, which excludes lakes, ponds, glaciers > 1 km^{2} (0.386 sq mi or 247 acres) and river estuaries.

Savigny-Lévescault (French pronunciation: [saviɲi levɛsko]) is a commune in the Vienne department in the Nouvelle-Aquitaine region in western France.

== See also ==
- Communes of the Vienne department
