= Cenon-sur-Vienne =

- Commune
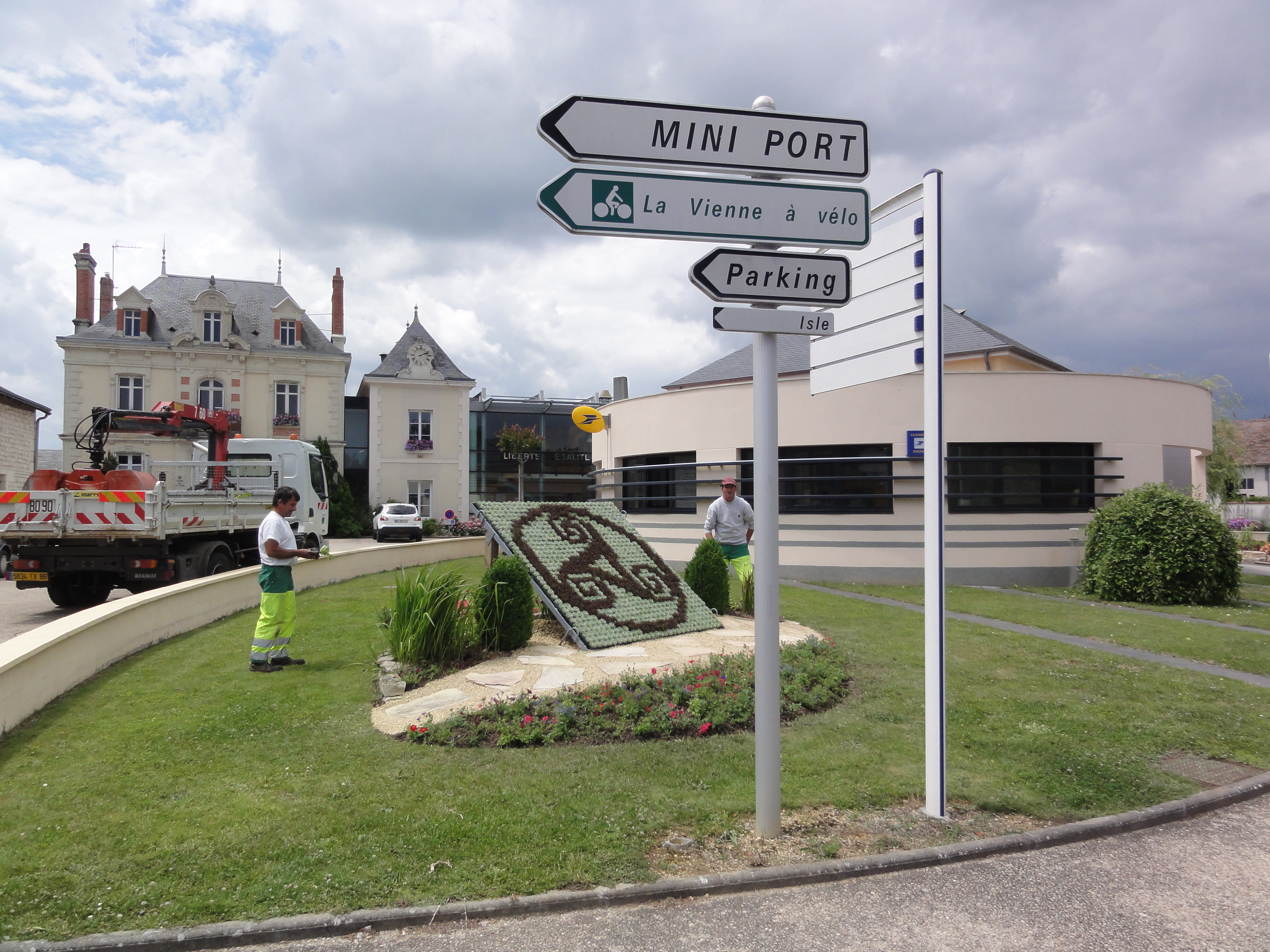
- The town hall square in Cenon-sur-Vienne
- Location of Cenon-sur-Vienne
- Location within France Location within Nouvelle-Aquitaine
- Coordinates: 46°46′32″N 0°32′15″E
- Country: France
- Region: Nouvelle-Aquitaine
- Department: Vienne
- Arrondissement: Châtellerault
- Canton: Chauvigny
- Intercommunality: CA Grand Châtellerault

Government
  - Mayor (2020–2026): Odile Landreau
- Area^{1}: 8.6 km^{2} (3.3 sq mi)
- Elevation: 54 m (177 ft)
- Highest elevation: 105 m (344 ft)
- Lowest elevation: 47 m (154 ft)
- Population (2023): 1,666
  - Density: 190/km^{2} (500/sq mi)
- Time zone: UTC+01:00 (CET)
  - Summer (DST): UTC+02:00 (CEST)
- INSEE/Postal code: 86046 /86530
- ^{1} French Land Register data, which excludes lakes, ponds, glaciers > 1 km^{2} (0.386 sq mi or 247 acres) and river estuaries.

Cenon-sur-Vienne (French pronunciation: [sənɔ̃ syʁ vjɛn], literally Cenon on Vienne) is a commune in the Vienne department in the Nouvelle-Aquitaine region in western France.

== Demographics ==
Historical population
Year	Pop.	±% p.a.
1968	837	—
1975	963	+2.02%
1982	1,240	+3.68%
1990	1,620	+3.40%
1999	1,900	+1.79%
2007	1,822	−0.52%
2012	1,829	+0.08%
2017	1,778	−0.56%
2023	1,666	−1.08%
Source: INSEE

== See also ==
- Communes of the Vienne department
