= Canton of Chasseneuil-du-Poitou =

Coordinates: 46.65°N 0.37°E

The canton of Chasseneuil-du-Poitou is an administrative division of the Vienne department, western France. It was created at the French canton reorganisation which came into effect in March 2015. Its seat is in Chasseneuil-du-Poitou.

It consists of the following communes:

1. Bignoux
2. Bonnes
3. La Chapelle-Moulière
4. Chasseneuil-du-Poitou
5. Jardres
6. Lavoux
7. Liniers
8. Montamisé
9. Pouillé
10. Saint-Julien-l'Ars
11. Savigny-Lévescault
12. Sèvres-Anxaumont
13. Tercé
