= Saint-Benoît, Vienne =

Saint-Benoît
- Commune
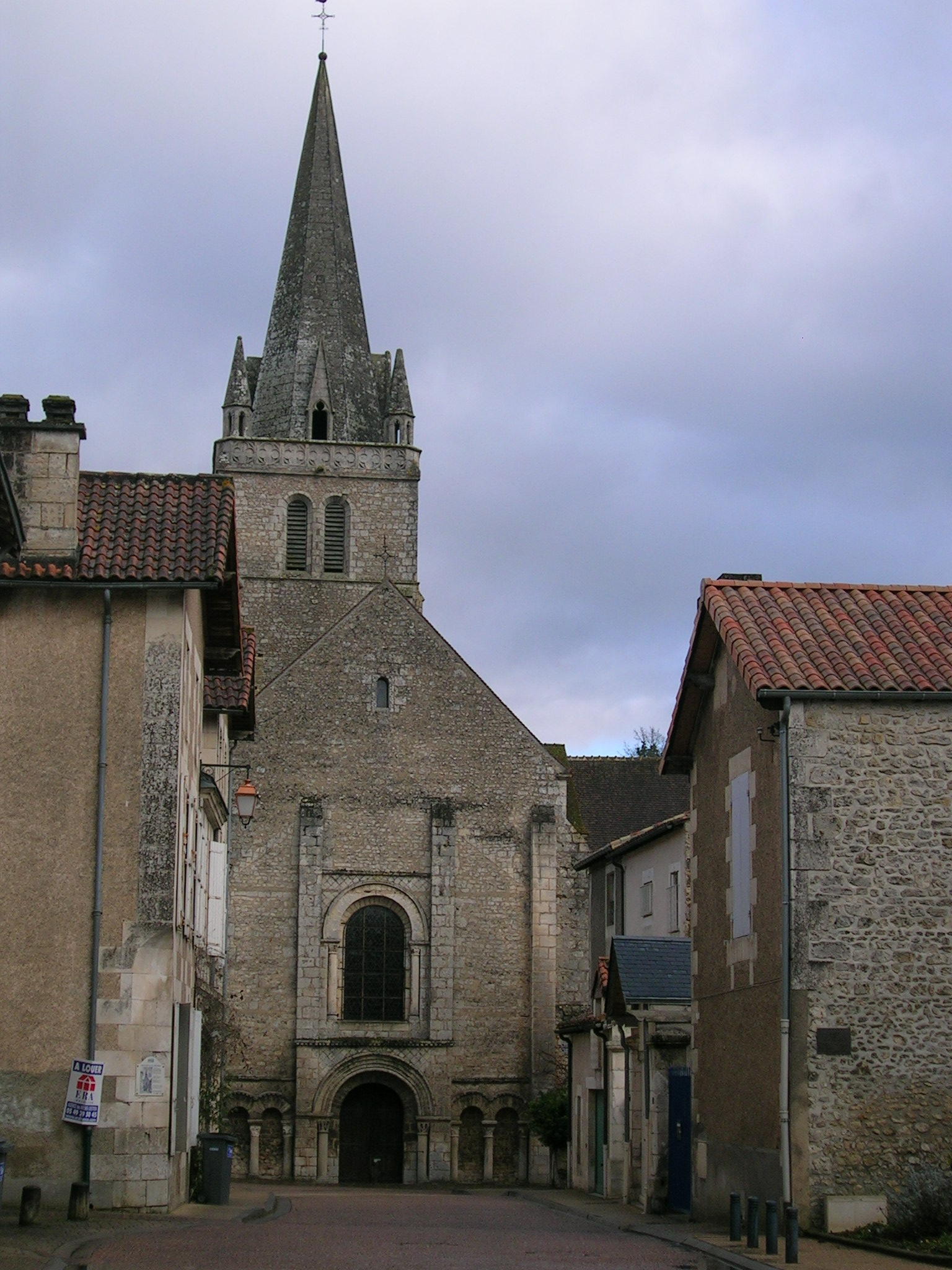
- The Abbey of Saint-Benoit

- Coat of arms
- Location of Saint-Benoît
- Location within France Location within Nouvelle-Aquitaine
- Coordinates: 46°33′02″N 0°20′33″E
- Country: France
- Region: Nouvelle-Aquitaine
- Department: Vienne
- Arrondissement: Poitiers
- Canton: Poitiers-5
- Intercommunality: CU Grand Poitiers

Government
  - Mayor (2020–2026): Bernard Peterlongo
- Area^{1}: 13.58 km^{2} (5.24 sq mi)
- Elevation: 80 m (260 ft)
- Highest elevation: 136 m (446 ft)
- Lowest elevation: 72 m (236 ft)
- Population (2023): 7,375
  - Density: 543.1/km^{2} (1,407/sq mi)
- Time zone: UTC+01:00 (CET)
  - Summer (DST): UTC+02:00 (CEST)
- INSEE/Postal code: 86214 /86280
- ^{1} French Land Register data, which excludes lakes, ponds, glaciers > 1 km^{2} (0.386 sq mi or 247 acres) and river estuaries.

Saint-Benoît (French pronunciation: [sɛ̃ bənwa]) is a commune in the Vienne department in the Nouvelle-Aquitaine region in western France. It is a southern suburb of Poitiers.

== Population ==
Historical population
Year	Pop.	±% p.a.
1968	3,881	—
1975	4,889	+3.35%
1982	5,397	+1.42%
1990	5,843	+1.00%
1999	7,008	+2.04%
2007	6,989	−0.03%
2012	7,094	+0.30%
2017	7,233	+0.39%
2023	7,375	+0.32%
Source: INSEE

== International relations ==
Saint-Benoît is twinned with:

- Cookham, United Kingdom

== See also ==
- Communes of the Vienne department
