= Louis Olivier Bourbeau =

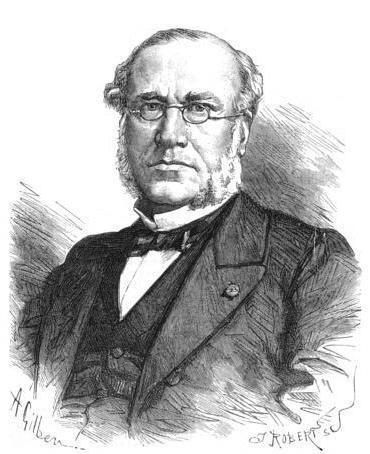
- Bourbeau from l'Illustration, 9 October 1869
- Born: 2 March 1811; Poitiers, Vienne, France
- Died: 6 October 1877 (aged 66); Fontaine, Vienne, France
- Occupation: Lawyer
- Known for: Minister of Education

Louis Olivier Bourbeau (2 March 1811 – 6 October 1877) was a French lawyer and politician who became Minister of Education during the Second French Empire.

== Life ==
Louis Olivier Bourbeau was born on 2 March 1811 in Poitiers, Vienne, France. He was son of a tutor and grandson of the mayor of the city of Poitiers (Poitiers is "Chef-Lieu de la Vienne"). His family had long been notaries in Poitiers. He studied at Sorèze, then became a pupil of Professor Boncenne. In 1834 he became a doctor of law. In 1835 he married Anne Louise Arnault Ménardière, daughter of a solicitor of the Court of Appeal of Poitiers. They had four children. In 1940 he was made a professor at the University of Poitiers Faculty of Law, and after the death of his master that year was named professor of civil procedure and criminal law. He succeeded in the agrégation in 1841. At the same time he pursued a career as a lawyer.

== Political career ==
Bourbeau became a city Councillor and was elected mayor of Poitiers in 1847. In 1848 he was elected to represent his department in the Constituent Assembly. He was very active in the Assembly, but the next year retired from politics to devote himself to his legal practice and teaching position. In 1865 he was again elected mayor of Poitiers. In May 1867 he was appointed Dean of the Faculty of Law at the university.

Bourbeau was asked to stand for the 3rd district of Vienne in the parliamentary elections of 1869, and was easily elected. On 17 July 1869 he was appointed Minister of Education, replacing Victor Duruy. He held this post until December 1869. He was elected to the Legislative Corps on 22 November 1869, and in March 1870 was rapporteur for the plan to abolish the death penalty. After the Second Empire fell in 1871, he regained his position as professor at Poitiers. He became President of the General Council of Vienne. In 1876 he was elected Senator.

Louis Olivier Bourbeau died at Fontaine, Vienne, on 6 October 1877. He was succeeded as senator for Vienne by Eugène Arnaudeau.
