= Canton of Chauvigny =

Coordinates: 46.57°N 0.65°E

The canton of Chauvigny is an administrative division of the Vienne department, western France. Its borders were modified at the French canton reorganisation which came into effect in March 2015. Its seat is in Chauvigny.

It consists of the following communes:

1. Archigny
2. Availles-en-Châtellerault
3. Bellefonds
4. Bonneuil-Matours
5. Cenon-sur-Vienne
6. Chapelle-Viviers
7. Chauvigny
8. Fleix
9. Lauthiers
10. Leignes-sur-Fontaine
11. Monthoiron
12. Paizay-le-Sec
13. Sainte-Radégonde
14. Valdivienne
15. Vouneuil-sur-Vienne
