= Liniers, Vienne =

Liniers
- Commune
- Location of Liniers
- Location within France Location within Nouvelle-Aquitaine
- Coordinates: 46°36′39″N 0°32′14″E
- Country: France
- Region: Nouvelle-Aquitaine
- Department: Vienne
- Arrondissement: Poitiers
- Canton: Chasseneuil-du-Poitou
- Intercommunality: CU Grand Poitiers

Government
  - Mayor (2020–2026): Pascal Faideau
- Area^{1}: 16.19 km^{2} (6.25 sq mi)
- Elevation: 200 m (660 ft)
- Highest elevation: 138 m (453 ft)
- Lowest elevation: 97 m (318 ft)
- Population (2023): 591
  - Density: 36.5/km^{2} (94.5/sq mi)
- Time zone: UTC+01:00 (CET)
  - Summer (DST): UTC+02:00 (CEST)
- INSEE/Postal code: 86135 /86800
- ^{1} French Land Register data, which excludes lakes, ponds, glaciers > 1 km^{2} (0.386 sq mi or 247 acres) and river estuaries.

Liniers (French pronunciation: [linje]) is a commune in the Vienne department in the Nouvelle-Aquitaine region in western France.

== See also ==
- Communes of the Vienne department
