= Valdivienne =

- Commune
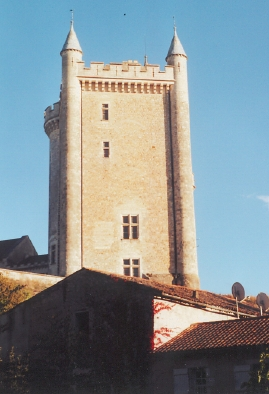
- The 12th century keep of the Château de Morthemer
- Location of Valdivienne
- Location within France Location within Nouvelle-Aquitaine
- Coordinates: 46°30′29″N 0°38′16″E
- Country: France
- Region: Nouvelle-Aquitaine
- Department: Vienne
- Arrondissement: Montmorillon
- Canton: Chauvigny

Government
  - Mayor (2020–2026): Claudie Bauvais
- Area^{1}: 61.24 km^{2} (23.64 sq mi)
- Elevation: 122 m (400 ft)
- Highest elevation: 149 m (489 ft)
- Lowest elevation: 62 m (203 ft)
- Population (2023): 2,715
  - Density: 44.33/km^{2} (114.8/sq mi)
- Time zone: UTC+01:00 (CET)
  - Summer (DST): UTC+02:00 (CEST)
- INSEE/Postal code: 86233 /86300
- ^{1} French Land Register data, which excludes lakes, ponds, glaciers > 1 km^{2} (0.386 sq mi or 247 acres) and river estuaries.

Valdivienne (French pronunciation: [valdivjɛn]) is a commune in the Vienne department in the Nouvelle-Aquitaine region in western France. Its name is a contraction of "Vallée de la Dive et de la Vienne" (the Dive and Vienne valley). It was created in 1969 by the merger of three former communes: Morthemer, Salles-en-Toulon and Saint-Martin-la-Rivière (the seat). In 1974 it absorbed the former commune Chapelle-Morthemer.

== Population ==
Historical population
Year	Pop.	±% p.a.
1968	2,071	—
1975	1,943	−0.91%
1982	1,955	+0.09%
1990	1,918	−0.24%
1999	2,308	+2.08%
2007	2,455	+0.77%
2012	2,685	+1.81%
2017	2,747	+0.46%
2023	2,715	−0.20%
Source: INSEE

== See also ==
- Communes of the Vienne department
