= Grand Poitiers =

Coordinates: 46.58°N 0.34°E

- Communauté urbaine
- Country: France
- Region: Nouvelle-Aquitaine
- Department: Vienne
- No. of communes: {{{nbcomm}}}
- Established: 2017
- Area: 1,064.7 km^{2} (411.1 sq mi)
- Population (2020): 196,530
  - Density: 184.59/km^{2} (478.08/sq mi)
- Website: www.grandpoitiers.fr

Grand Poitiers is the communauté urbaine, an intercommunal structure, centred on the city of Poitiers. It is located in the Vienne department, in the Nouvelle-Aquitaine region, western France. It was created on 1 January 2017 as a communauté d'agglomération and transformed into a communauté urbaine on 1 July 2017. Its area is 1064.7 km^{2}. Its population was 196,530 in 2020, of which 90,033 in Poitiers proper.

== Composition ==
The communauté urbaine consists of the following 40 communes:

1. Beaumont Saint-Cyr
2. Béruges
3. Biard
4. Bignoux
5. Bonnes
6. Buxerolles
7. Celle-Lévescault
8. La Chapelle-Moulière
9. Chasseneuil-du-Poitou
10. Chauvigny
11. Cloué
12. Coulombiers
13. Croutelle
14. Curzay-sur-Vonne
15. Dissay
16. Fontaine-le-Comte
17. Jardres
18. Jaunay-Marigny
19. Jazeneuil
20. Lavoux
21. Ligugé
22. Liniers
23. Lusignan
24. Mignaloux-Beauvoir
25. Migné-Auxances
26. Montamisé
27. Poitiers
28. Pouillé
29. La Puye
30. Rouillé
31. Saint-Benoît
32. Sainte-Radégonde
33. Saint-Georges-lès-Baillargeaux
34. Saint-Julien-l'Ars
35. Saint-Sauvant
36. Sanxay
37. Savigny-Lévescault
38. Sèvres-Anxaumont
39. Tercé
40. Vouneuil-sous-Biard
