= Sèvres-Anxaumont =

- Commune
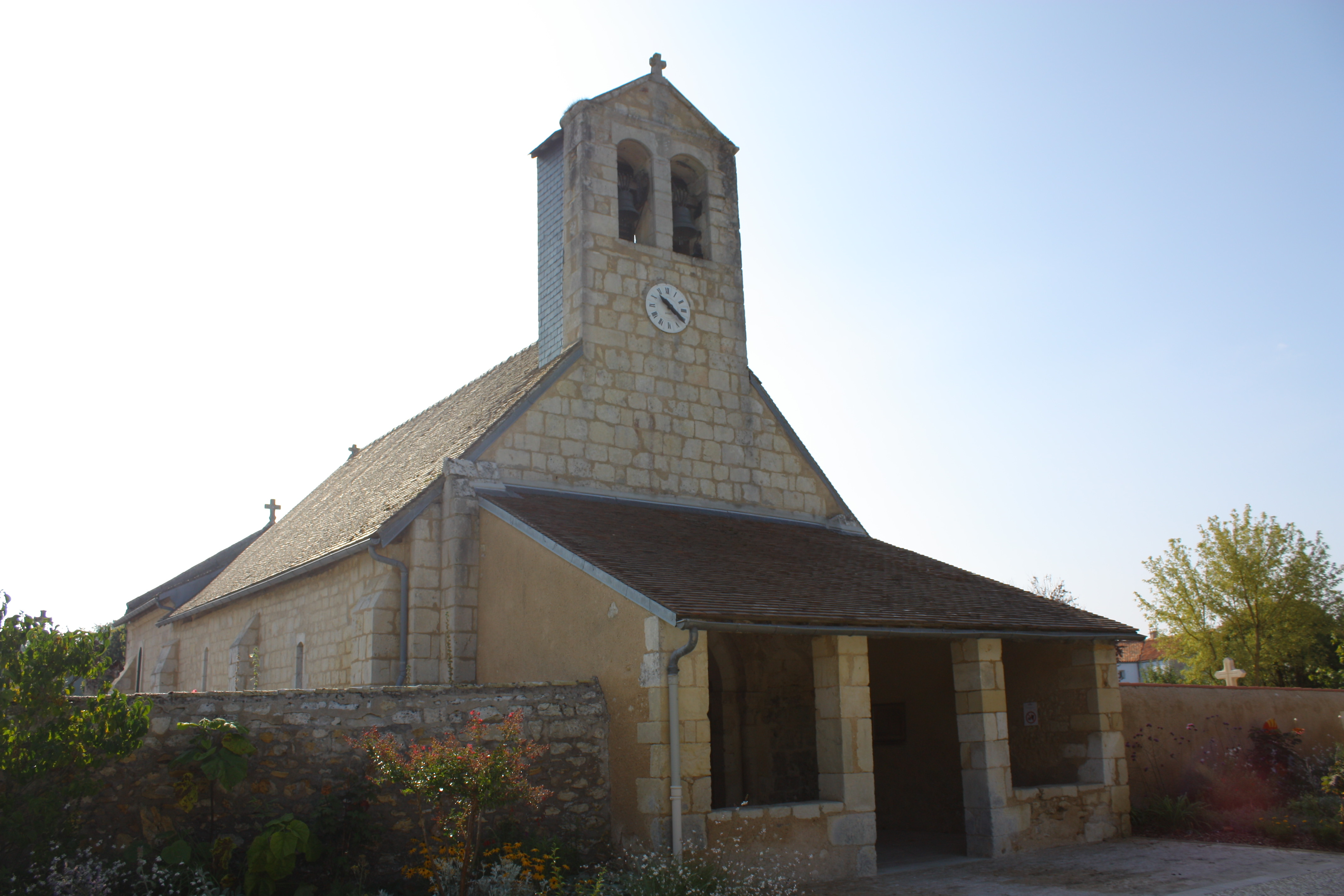
- The church of Saint-Nicolas, in Sèvres-Anxaumont
- Location of Sèvres-Anxaumont
- Location within France Location within Nouvelle-Aquitaine
- Coordinates: 46°34′14″N 0°27′57″E
- Country: France
- Region: Nouvelle-Aquitaine
- Department: Vienne
- Arrondissement: Poitiers
- Canton: Chasseneuil-du-Poitou
- Intercommunality: CU Grand Poitiers

Government
  - Mayor (2020–2026): Romain Mignot
- Area^{1}: 15.49 km^{2} (5.98 sq mi)
- Elevation: 112 m (367 ft)
- Highest elevation: 129 m (423 ft)
- Lowest elevation: 98 m (322 ft)
- Population (2023): 2,394
  - Density: 154.6/km^{2} (400.3/sq mi)
- Time zone: UTC+01:00 (CET)
  - Summer (DST): UTC+02:00 (CEST)
- INSEE/Postal code: 86261 /86800
- ^{1} French Land Register data, which excludes lakes, ponds, glaciers > 1 km^{2} (0.386 sq mi or 247 acres) and river estuaries.

Sèvres-Anxaumont (French pronunciation: [sɛvʁ(ə) ɑ̃ksomɔ̃]) is a commune in the Vienne department in the Nouvelle-Aquitaine region in western France.

== Population ==
Historical population
Year	Pop.	±% p.a.
1968	630	—
1975	958	+6.17%
1982	1,346	+4.98%
1990	1,601	+2.19%
1999	1,779	+1.18%
2007	1,895	+0.79%
2012	1,981	+0.89%
2017	2,181	+1.94%
2023	2,394	+1.57%
Source: INSEE

== See also ==
- Communes of the Vienne department
