= Lisa Belluco =

French politician (born 1988)

Lisa Belluco (born 20 July 1988 in Metz) is a French politician and a member of the French Parliament since the 2022 French legislative election.

== Biography ==
Lisa Belluco was born to a mother who was a Psychologist at a medical-social center for children and a father who was a special education teacher, both of whom were actively involved in community and local life.

Lisa Belluco is a left-wing Catholic Church, as is her family environment.

Lisa Belluco obtained an engineering degree from the École des mines d'Alès. She completed her education with a year of training in Public Policy and Environmental Strategies at AgroParisTech. She obtained civil servant status and joined the DREAL Nouvelle-Aquitaine as an environmental inspector.
