= Jacques Savatier =

French politician

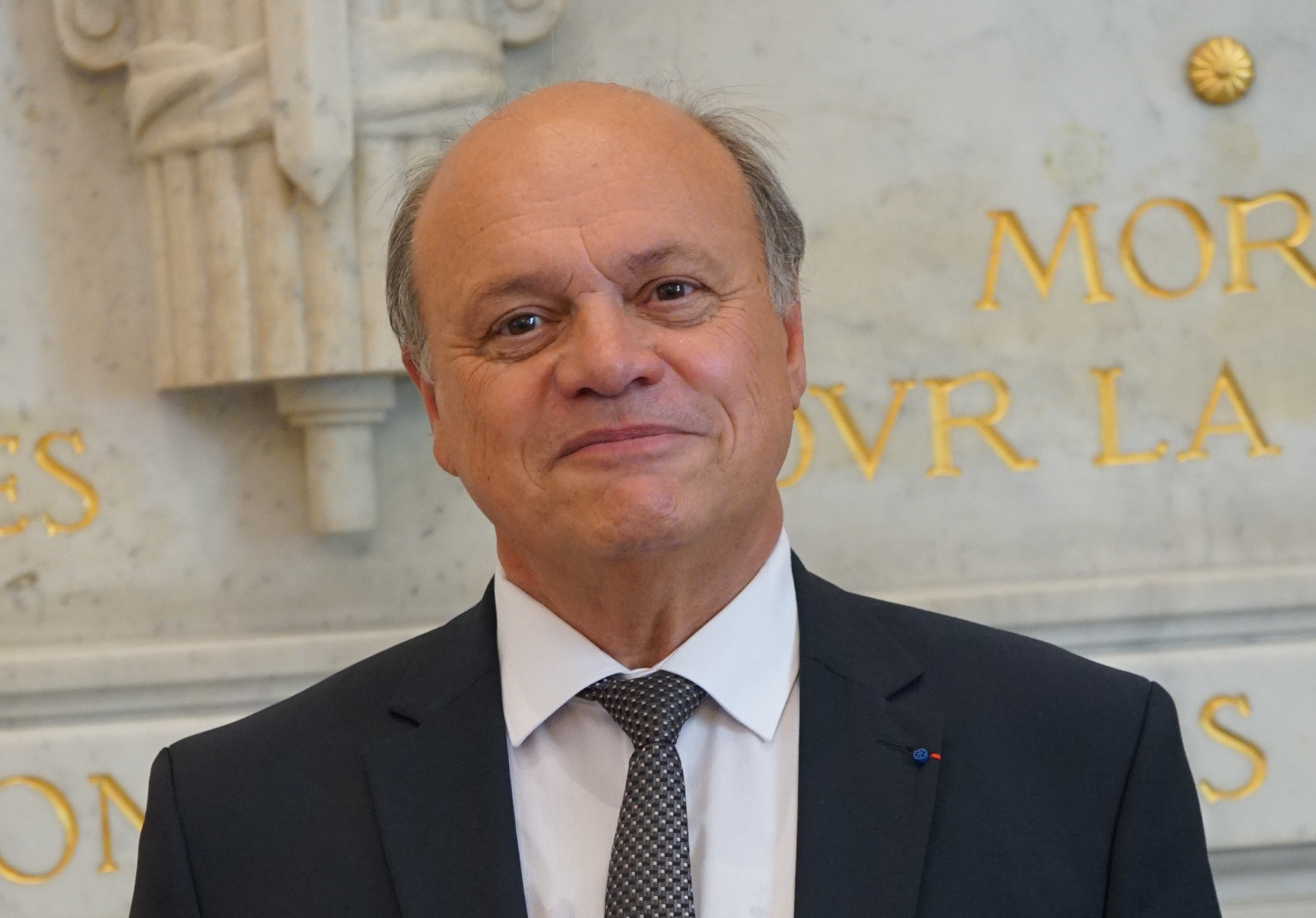
Jacques Savatier (2017).

Jacques Savatier is a French politician representing La République En Marche! He was elected to the French National Assembly on 18 June 2017, representing the department of Vienne.

== Biography ==
Jacques Savatier is an Agricultural engineering and civil engineer specializing in bridges, water, and forests. He works with government agencies, local authorities, and businesses.

He began his career at the General Inspectorate of Agronomy for the Centre region (from 1976 to 1978), then for the Poitou-Charentes region (from 1978 to 1981). Then, from 1982 to 1990, he was responsible for rural affairs, then economic affairs, regional planning, and the environment for the same region. From 1993 to 1997, he was director of tourism for the Vienne General Council at Futuroscope.

From 1981 to 1982, he was a special advisor to the Prefect of the Poitou-Charentes region on agriculture, rural development, the environment, and education. In 1990, still working for the Prefect of Poitou-Charentes, he was assigned a national mission for Délégation interministérielle à l'aménagement du territoire et à l'attractivité régionale (coastal development, enforcement of the 1986 law). From 1992 to 1993, he was Regional Director of the Environment for Poitou-Charentes (DIREN). In 1997, he was appointed Secretary General for Regional Affairs (SGAR) for the Centre-Val de Loire.

In April 2003, he was appointed director and advisor to the president and CEO of La Poste (France) for regional consultation and presence. In 2008, he also became director of sustainable development for the La Poste group. He has been retired since April 1, 2016.

== See also ==
- 2017 French legislative election
