= Étaules, Charente-Maritime =

Étaules
- Commune
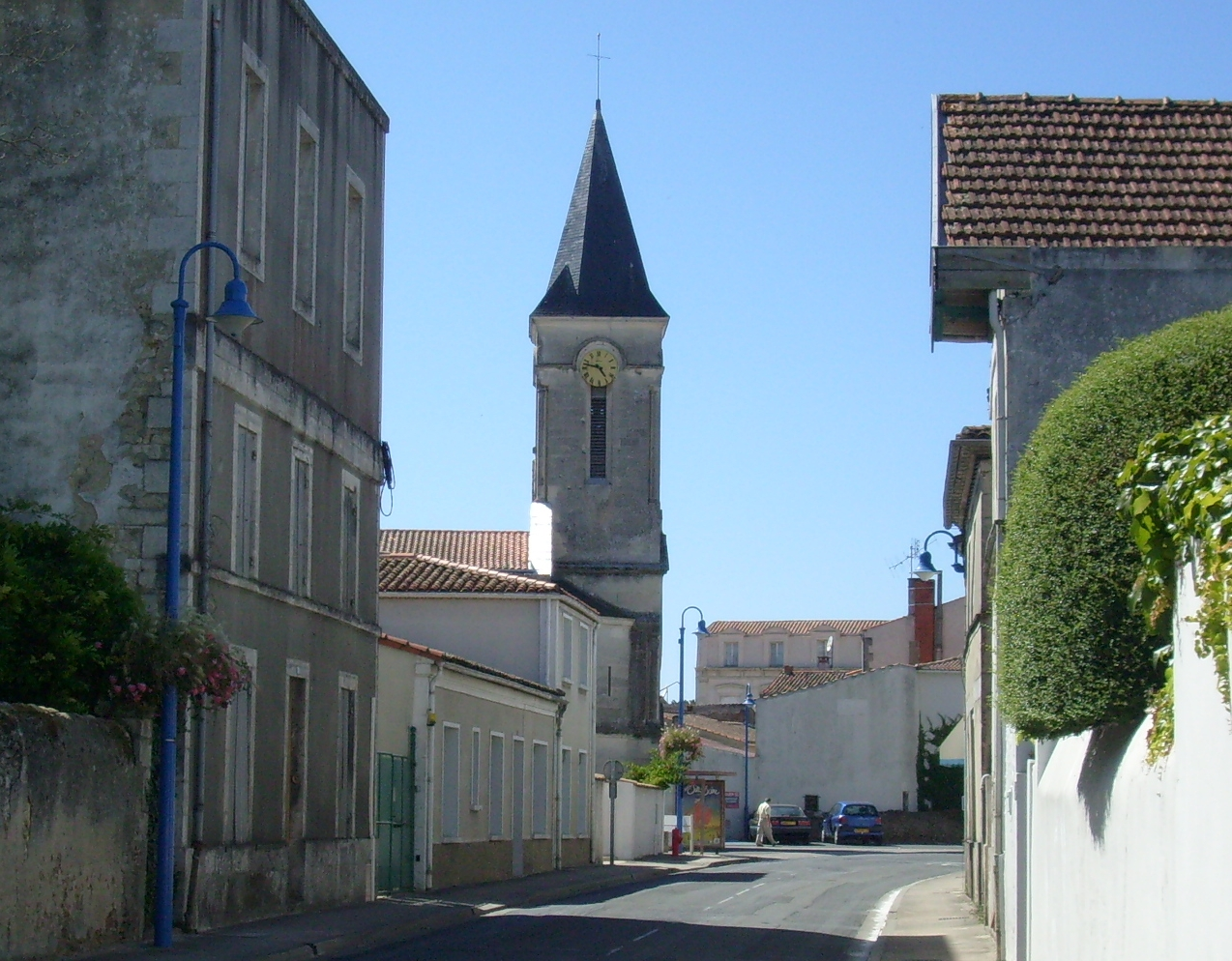
- Church of Notre-Dame (18th century)

- Coat of arms
- Location of Étaules
- Location within France Location within Nouvelle-Aquitaine
- Coordinates: 45°43′56″N 1°05′52″W
- Country: France
- Region: Nouvelle-Aquitaine
- Department: Charente-Maritime
- Arrondissement: Rochefort
- Canton: La Tremblade
- Intercommunality: CA Royan Atlantique

Government
  - Mayor (2020–2026): Vincent Barraud
- Area^{1}: 11.55 km^{2} (4.46 sq mi)
- Highest elevation: 28 m (92 ft)
- Lowest elevation: 0 m (0 ft)
- Population (2023): 2,857
  - Density: 247.4/km^{2} (640.7/sq mi)
- Time zone: UTC+01:00 (CET)
  - Summer (DST): UTC+02:00 (CEST)
- INSEE/Postal code: 17155 /17750
- ^{1} French Land Register data, which excludes lakes, ponds, glaciers > 1 km^{2} (0.386 sq mi or 247 acres) and river estuaries.

Étaules (French pronunciation: [etol]) is a commune in the Charente-Maritime department and Nouvelle-Aquitaine region in southwestern France.

Located in the heart of the Arvert peninsula and the touristic region of Royannais, in the continental fringe of the "Côte de Beauté" and near the famous oyster farming zone of Marennes-Oléron, this small town is well situated in the western suburbs of Royan. The city experience constant and sustained growth for over twenty years (its population was 1,413 in 1990 and 2,375 inhabitants in 2012). With its "sisters cities" Arvert, Chaillevette and La Tremblade, Étaules forms a small conurbation of 11,630 inhabitants, with many services and shops.

The town benefits from its proximity to the seaside resorts on the Atlantic coast (Royan, Vaux-sur-Mer, Saint-Palais-sur-Mer, La Palmyre) and the forest of la Coubre, a natural reserve of biodiversity, and has developed tourism-related activities, accommodation Cap France, a camping and several seasonal dwellings. It is also an important oyster production center, with two ports : Orivol and Les Grandes Roches. The city is strongly influences by Royan, the main economic center of the area. Modernization of roads, marked by the opening of a ring road round the downtown, also facilitates connections with La Tremblade, the tiny capital of the canton.

Étaules belongs to the agglomeration community Royan Atlantique (CARA), intercommunal structure gathering about 84,000 inhabitants.

== Geography ==
The town of Étaules is located south-west of the department of Charente-Maritime and the Nouvelle-Aquitaine region in the heart of the Arvert peninsula, in the continental section of the "Côte de Beauté". The commune is in a conurbation comprising La Tremblade (the main urban centre), Arvert, and Chaillevette and could be considered part of the outlying "suburbs" of Royan which is the main urban centre and economic hub of the area. Administratively it is part of the Canton of La Tremblade and the Arrondissement of Rochefort.

Étaules in the département of Charente-Maritime.

The city is located 2.3 kilometers from Arvert, 3.2 kilometers from Chaillevette, 4.9 kilometers from Saint-Augustin, 5.2 kilometers from Breuillet, 5.4 kilometers from La Tremblade, 7.8 kilometers from Saint-Sulpice-de-Royan, 9.7 kilometers from Saint-Palais-sur-Mer, 9.9 kilometers from Vaux-sur-Mer, 12.9 kilometers from Royan, 15.1 kilometers from Saujon, 25.6 miles Rochefort, 35.8 kilometers from Saintes, 47.8 kilometers from La Rochelle, and 107.1 km from Bordeaux.

Etaules with the rest of the department belongs to the "Midi de la France", Southern France area - or more specifically "South Atlantic". The commune also lies within two major geographical areas: the Grand-Ouest and the Grand Sud-Ouest. Etaules has an area of 1,155 hectares consisting of a patchwork of salted marshes (the Seudre marshes) or soft marsh partially drained (the St. Augustin marshes), forests areas announcing the nearby forest of la Coubre, pastures, vineyards, agricultural "champagnes" with dominant cereal, and artificialised spaces, steadily a result of further development of the town and an urban sprawl particularly strong, especially along the road to La Tremblade-Saujon (D14), a major focus of the peninsula. This has created a continuous built over nearly seven kilometers from the exit of Chaillevette up Tremblade and Ronce-les-Bains, characterised by the construction of many housing estates and residential areas that unite the old urban cores and many hamlets previously isolated.

Situation of Etaules on the Seudre estuary.

Oyster farms are one of the structural elements of the municipal landscape. Established along the estuary of Seudre, which here reaches an impressive width, they form a set which overlap land and water. The countryside consists of humid green meadows and extensive gray-blue mudflats (the Seudre marshes) highlighted by golden lines of reeds, hedges, and aquatic plants with, in line of sight, the Marennes steeple forming a landmark, labyrinth of water space and light, which, in lockers shimmering in the sun (the "claires"), oysters of the basin are set to refine and where they acquire their flavor and special color under the action of a pigment (marennine) produced by a microscopic algae called "navicule bleue".

Two small oyster ports, sometimes brightly painted huts, characteristics of Marennes-Oléron, punctuate this part of the town: Orivol, northwest, on the banks of the channel of the same name, lies at the junction catches of the "prise" of Malletatier and La Sause; Les Grandes Roches, a little above, is between the channels of Les Grandes Roches and Brégauds (the latter forming the administrative boundary with the municipality of Chaillevette when the channel of Orivol serves as a natural border with the town of Arvert). Natural area of rich flora and fauna, the marshes of the Seudre is a repository of rare plants and a bird sanctuary in the foreground.

Descending to the south, on the margins of the estuary of the Seudre, a little accentuated tray serves buttress these wetland areas. Gradually, as it rises towards the Groies and Beauregard, he wears the vineyards for the manufacture of brandies known in the area, cognac and Pineau des Charentes, as well as local wines. Further south lie some soft hills that form somehow the backbone of the peninsula of Arvert. Formed in Cretaceous limestones heights are in places covered with superficial formations (silt, clay) where some forests flourish. The latter, which cover no less than 150 hectares, form a dense canopy where mingle hardwood (oak, holm oaks or "yeuses" in saintongeais dialect, etc.) and softwood (mainly pine trees), the first fruits of the vast pine forest of Coubre remote barely a few kilometers, and whose balsamic scent is noticeable when the summer breezes blow. The main wood of the town are the Bois de Chassagne, the Bois des Clones, the bois des Pérets or the bois des Fougerons.

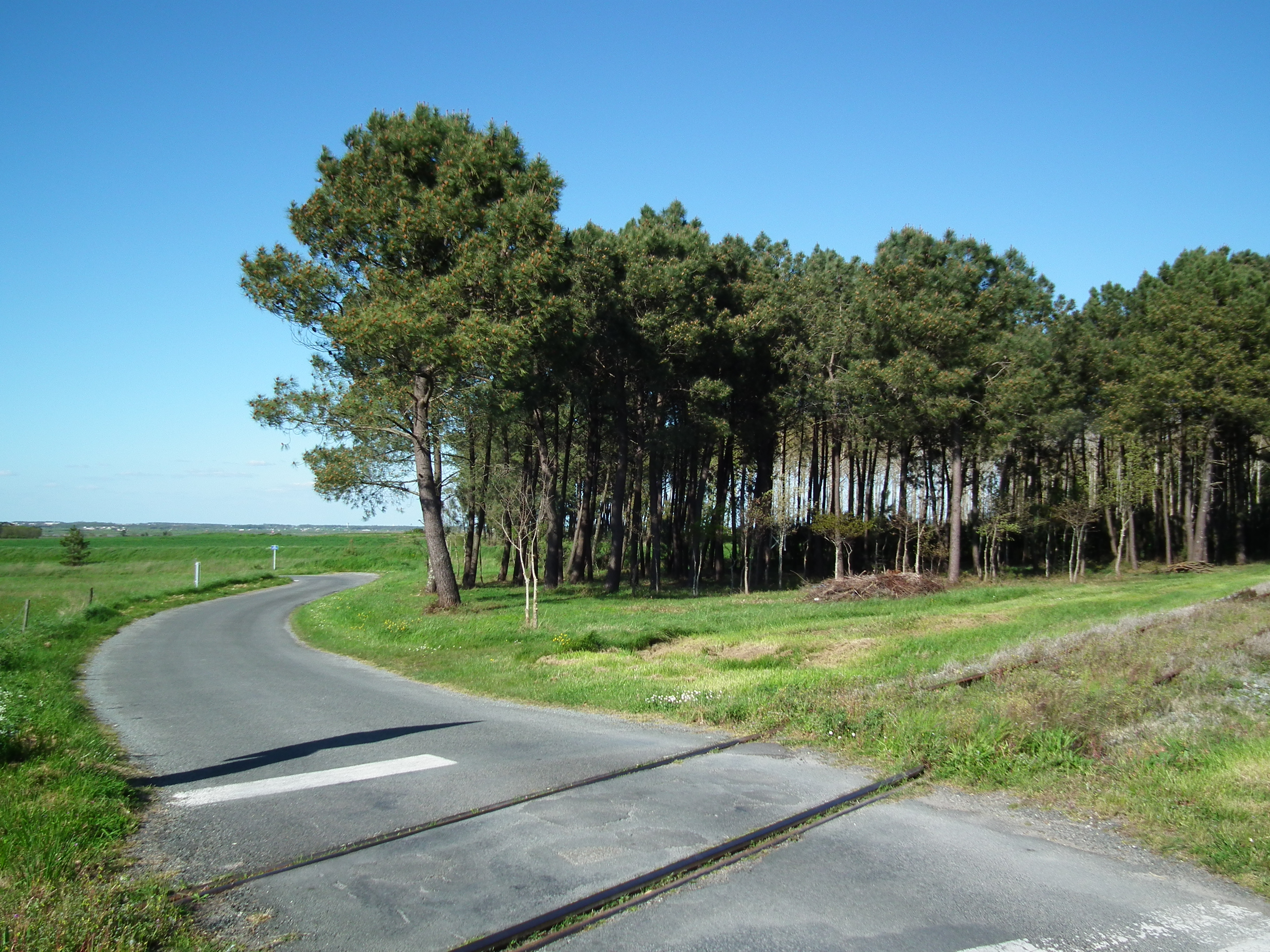
Woods on Chassagne hill.

Further south (beyond a few materialized line or less by the main road), new marshes abut against the tray. The marshes of Saint-Augustin, soft to the contrary the marshes of the Seudre, cover 1586 hectares including 850 only on the comune of Étaules. Forming a transition zone between the coast and dune formations (Saint-Palais-sur-Mer, La Palmyre), they are a relic of the former Gulf of Arvert which became the Barbareu Pond in the Middle Ages, which initially connected to the sea by a small outlet (cove Brajado, now Bréjat) has gradually filled over the centuries, under the action of masses of dune sands which have cut off all communication with the estuary of the Gironde. Small islands emerged from these vast expanses Water: île de Paradis, île de Brèze, île de la Lourde... L'île/Isle d'Étaules - actually a peninsula - has long been the main population center of the parish before it is transferred to its current location. It does not exceed a height of 21 meters and retains many vines that bloom in these limestones and well exposed terrain.

With the closure of the outlet of Bréjat, canals were dug to prevent water stagnation, long disease vectors. The Grand Ecours, which forms the administrative boundary with Saint-Augustin and Les Mathes, is one of the most important. Vast green spaces consist of wet meadows crisscrossed with ditches and punctuated by groves, Saint-Augustin marshes are home to a rich and varied flora, which rushes mingle, pulicaires, water plantain or irises. Near the Fief de Bel-Air (rue du Haut-des-Bois) or L'île d'Etaules (rue du Maine-Videau), panoramic views help to understand the reality of this conservation area.

== Transport ==
=== Bicycle paths ===
The commune has a network of bicycle paths as part of the "Pathways of Seudre" - a collaboration between the Department Council, the Agglomeration Community Royan Atlantique, and the Community of communes of the Marennes basin. The network has been operated since 2007 and allows the exploration of oyster farms and the Seudre Marsh landscape.

=== Public transport ===
The town is served by the Cara'Bus public transport network which connects to other communes in the Royannaise agglomeration. It was inaugurated on 2 January 2006 under the name " Très Royannais" and was originally composed of hybrid minibuses (electric and diesel). It has been operated since September 2008 by the Veolia Transport company and was renamed "Cara'Bus" since then.

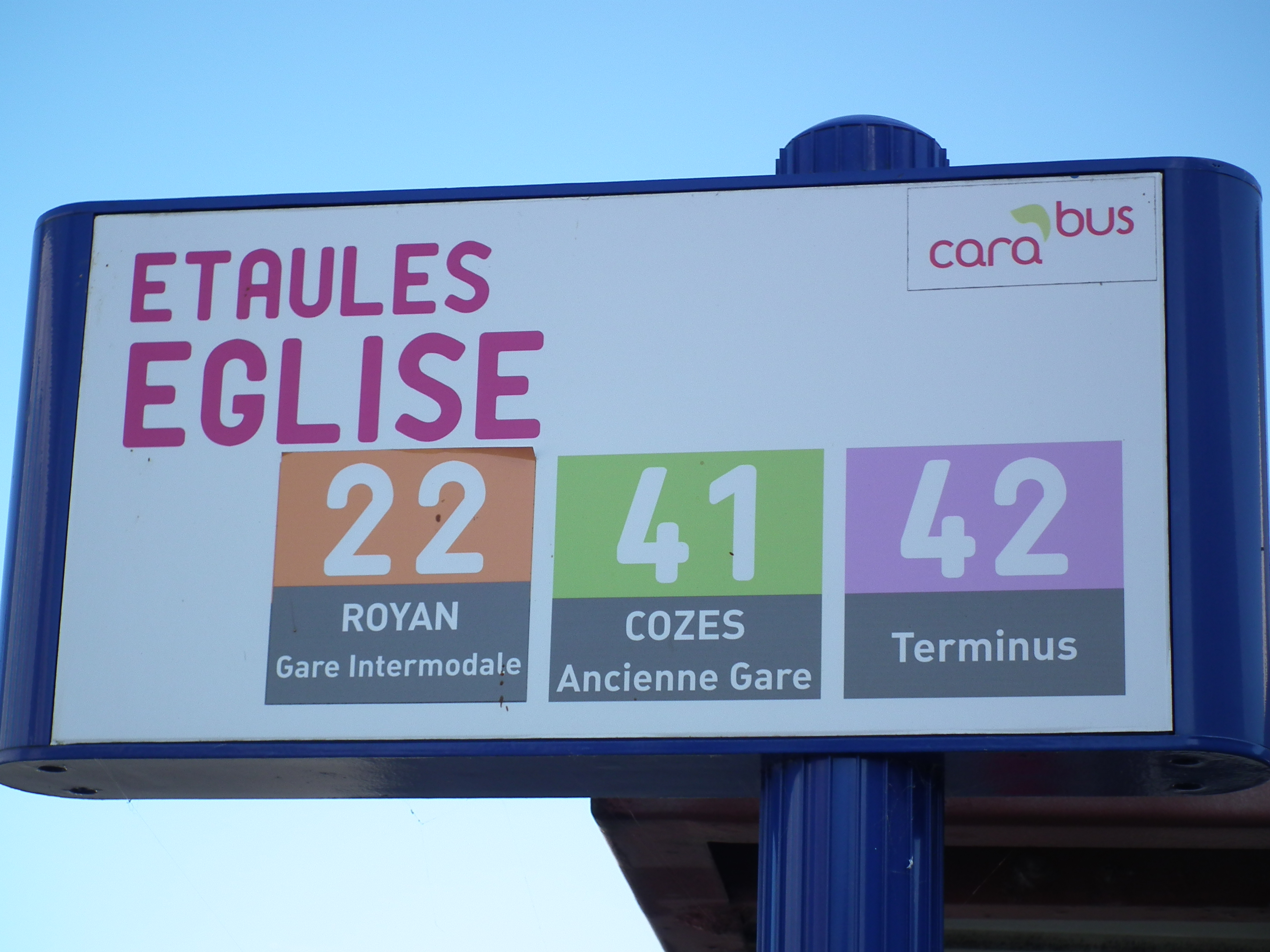
Étaules-Église, one of the three stops of the Cara'Bus urban transport network of Royan.

A modernization of the urban transport network in the agglomeration on 5 January 2009 led to the purchase of Heuliez shuttle buses as well as increasing the number of regular routes from three to ten with three additional routes in summer.

Three Cara'Bus stops are located in the commune: Étaules-Syndicat d'initiative, Étaules-Église et Étaules-Cimetière, and a fourth in the entrance of the city, but in the commune of Chaillevette : Chaillevette-Rond-Point. Three bus routes serve the commune:

- Route 42 starts at Étaules passing all the stops in the commune and going to La Tremblade, Ronce-les-Bains, and Marennes;
- Route 41 starts from Ronce-les-Bains and goes to Cozes via La Tremblade, Arvert, Étaules, Chaillevette, Breuillet (Le Magarin stop), Saint-Sulpice-de-Royan (Fontbedeau stop), Saujon, Le Chay, and Grézac;
- Route 22 connects Bramble-les-Bains to the Royan multimodal railway station via La Tremblade, Arvert, Étaules, Chaillevette, Breuillet (Centre-Ville), Vaux-sur-Mer (Val Lumière shopping centre), and Royan.

The commune is also served by the Les Mouettes departmental transport company, more specifically by the routes 409, 410, and 411 which connect Breuillet to Bourcefranc-le-Chapus via Arvert, La Tremblade, and Marennes. This service links to the main cities of the department.

=== Air transport ===
The nearest airport is that of Rochefort Saint-Agnant, about 25 kilometres north. The La Rochelle – Île de Ré Airport, 50 kilometres north, has services to some major French cities such as Paris and Lyon as well as the British Isles and Northern Europe. About 100 kilometres south-east of the commune, Bordeaux - Merignac Airport is an international airport with connections to many countries.

== Policy and administration ==
=== Municipal administration ===
From 1789 to 1799, under the Act of 14 December 1789, the municipal agents (equivalent to mayors) were directly elected for 2 years and re-elected by the working citizens of the town aged 25 years or more who paid a tax of at least 3 days of work in the commune. Those who were eligible paid a tax equivalent to at least ten working days.

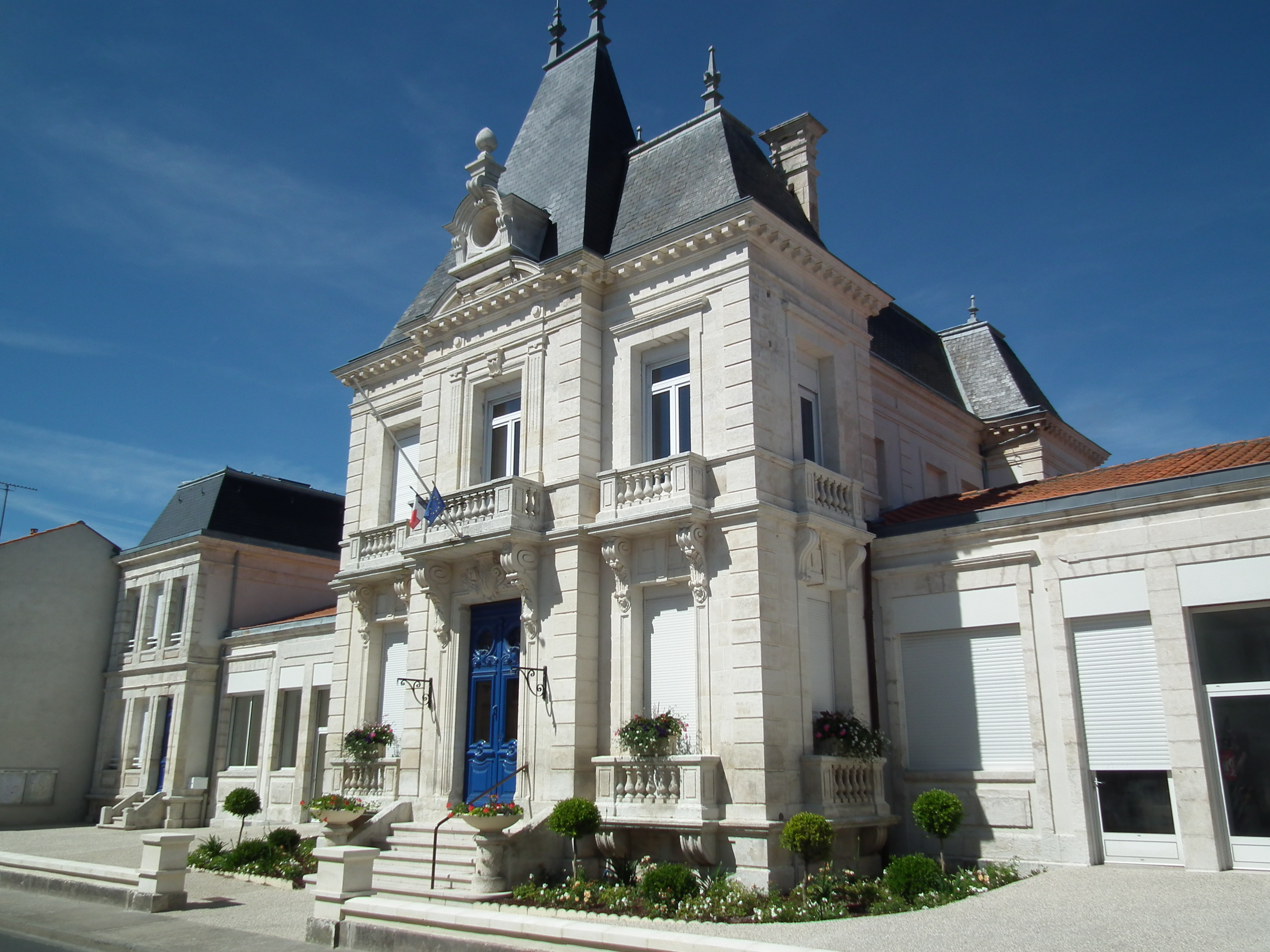
The city hall (19th century).

From 1799 to 1848, under the constitution of 22 Frimaire Year VIII (13 December 1799), mayors were appointed by the prefect for communes with less than 5,000 inhabitants. The Restoration established the appointment of mayors and councillors. After the 1831 organic law mayors were appointed (by the king for communes with more than 3,000 inhabitants, by the prefect for smaller) but councillors were elected by censal suffrage for six years.

From 3 July 1848 to 1851 mayors were elected by the municipal council for communes with fewer than 6,000 inhabitants.

From 1851 to 1871 mayors were appointed by the prefect for communes with less than 3,000 inhabitants and for 5 years from 1855. After 1871 mayors were elected again except in the capital towns (of departments, arrondissements, or cantons).

It was on 28 March 1882 that the current law on municipal organization was passed which governed the principle of election of the mayor and the deputy by the council whatever the size of the commune (except for Paris). The law of 5 April 1884 fixed the term to four years, a duration increased to six years on 10 April 1929.

According to its size, the commune has a council of 19 members (Article L2121-2 of the General Code of local authorities).

=== Canton ===
Etaules is one of the six communes in the Canton of La Tremblade. In 2010 it was the third most populous town behind La Tremblade and Arvert.

=== Inter-communality ===
Etaules is one of 34 communes adhering to the Urban Community of Royan Atlantique which includes the communes in the greater periphery of Royan.

=== Courts ===
Etaules depends on the Tribunal d'instance (district court) and the Conseil de prud'hommes (Labour Court) of Rochefort; the Tribunal de grande instance (High Court), the Tribunal pour enfants (Juvenile court), and the Tribunal de commerce (Commercial Court) of La Rochelle; the Tribunal administratif (Administrative Court) and the Cour d'appel Court of Appeal of Poitiers. The Cour administrative d'appel (Administrative Court of Appeal) is in Bordeaux.

=== Local taxation ===
The taxation of households and businesses in Etaules in 2010
Taxe	Communal part	Inter-communal part	Departmental part	Regional part
Dwelling Tax (TH)	12.20%	0.00%	7.12%	0.00%
Land value tax on built properties (TFPB)	22.99%	0.00%	14.01%	3.32%
Land value tax on vacant land (TFPNB)	66.29%	0.00%	29.17%	8.63%
Business Tax (CFE)	0.00%	22.54%	0.00%	0.00%

A regional share of the Dwelling tax is not applicable.

Professional tax was replaced in 2010 by the Land premium for companies (CFE) on the rental value of their property and the value added contribution of the business sector (CAVE) (the two forming the Territorial Economic Contribution (CET) which is a local tax introduced by the Finance Act 2010).

== Population and society ==
=== Demography ===
Historical population

Year	Pop.	±% p.a.
1793	666	—
1800	684	+0.38%
1806	679	−0.12%
1821	688	+0.09%
1831	864	+2.30%
1836	848	−0.37%
1841	858	+0.23%
1846	856	−0.05%
1851	922	+1.50%
1856	1,001	+1.66%
1861	1,056	+1.08%
1866	1,050	−0.11%
1872	1,036	−0.22%
1876	1,013	−0.56%
1881	1,107	+1.79%
1886	1,162	+0.97%
1891	1,178	+0.27%
1896	1,098	−1.40%
1901	1,131	+0.59%

Year	Pop.	±% p.a.
1906	1,160	+0.51%
1911	1,115	−0.79%
1921	1,005	−1.03%
1926	970	−0.71%
1931	946	−0.50%
1936	1,035	+1.81%
1946	962	−0.73%
1954	1,127	+2.00%
1962	1,290	+1.70%
1968	1,295	+0.06%
1975	1,262	−0.37%
1982	1,316	+0.60%
1990	1,413	+0.89%
1999	1,587	+1.30%
2007	2,153	+3.89%
2012	2,375	+1.98%
2017	2,475	+0.83%
2023	2,857	+2.42%

Source: EHESS and INSEE

=== Distribution of age groups ===
The population of the town is relatively young. The ratio of persons above the age of 60 years (32.8%) is a little bit higher than the departmental average (29.0%) and the national average (21.8%). Unlike national and departmental allocations, the male population of the town is less than the female population (47.2% against 48.1% nationally and 48.2% at the departmental level).

=== Education ===
Etaules depends on the Academy of Poitiers. The town has a kindergarten (small, medium, and large section) and an elementary school. Both schools have a school restaurant (self-service for students from the CP).

The kindergarten, located on Charles Hervé Street (main axis of the city center), has three classes. Its numbers were 65 children during the 2011–2012 school year. Three teachers, three specialized territorial agents and a school carer supervise children. Place of awakening, kindergarten hosts an activity room (with a floor damping). Workshops educating smaller to other cultures are organized occasionally, as well as educational shows. New games have been installed in the playground by communal workshops in August 2010. Damping mats have been put in place in order to further secure these play spaces.

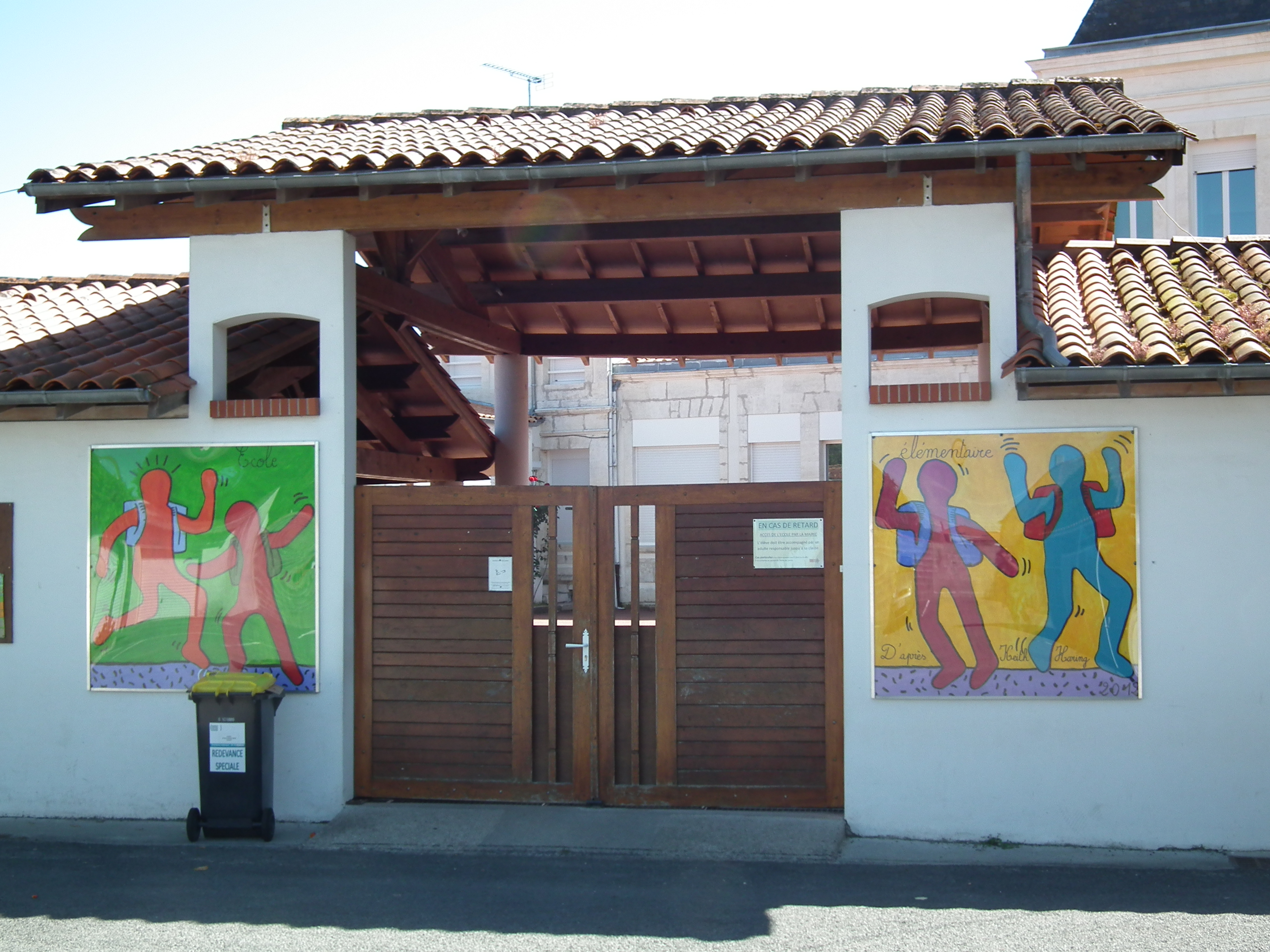
The elementary school of Etaules. The frescoes are a tribute to Keith Haring.

The elementary school, located rue des Ecoles, has five classes: CP, CE1, CE1 / CE2, CM1 and CM2. Its numbers were 124 students during the 2011–2012 school year. The faculty is composed of five teachers, assisted by an employee of school life. The school organizes sports activities throughout the year, including swimming lessons at the pool of Saujon and sailing courses at Ronce-les-Bains. As for the kindergarten, new games and rigging were set up in the playground in 2010, with the assistance of the company "OCE Loisir". Among these include in particular a secure portal providing vertical wall bars, horizontal wall bars, ladder climbing, climbing net reinforced rope, horizontal bar and a pair of gymnastic rings. The whole is protected by amortissants carpet.

The school has a new school canteen, commissioned in 2011. A home-work (local contract with schooling) has been set up for students in elementary school. In partnership with a municipal employee and in partnership with the "Relais assistance maternelle" of Royan, volunteers carrying two nights a week (Monday and Thursday) to provide assistance to children, but also to frame them for workshops (reading, crafts, etc.) and various activities; the purpose of these devices is "to promote the well-being and success of every child, but also to support the families." Finally, after-school reception service is open to school children in the town, every day of the school year, from 7:45 to 9:00 a.m. and 4:45 to 6:15 p.m.

Students of high schools are directed to the collège Fernand-Garandeau of La Tremblade, Étaules dependent school district of this city. The nearest high schools are located in Royan. The urban transport network Cara'Bus is responsible for student transportation.

Like all municipalities of the Sivom La Tremblade, Étaules adopts new school beats in September 2013. It is distinguished from its neighbors by asking a financial contribution set at €2.50 per child week, with a penalty of €5 per child in case of unjustified absence workshops.

==== Youth policy ====
Youth policy is set across the Canton of La Tremblade. It is managed by a SIVOM (Syndicat intercommunal à vocations multiples) and aims to accommodate children outside school times. It consists of three divisions: infants, children (3–12 years), and youths (13–18 years). Three Nursery schools are open to children of the canton: "La Farandole" and "Pirouettes Cacahuètes" in Arvert town centre, and "Les petites goules" at La Tremblade.

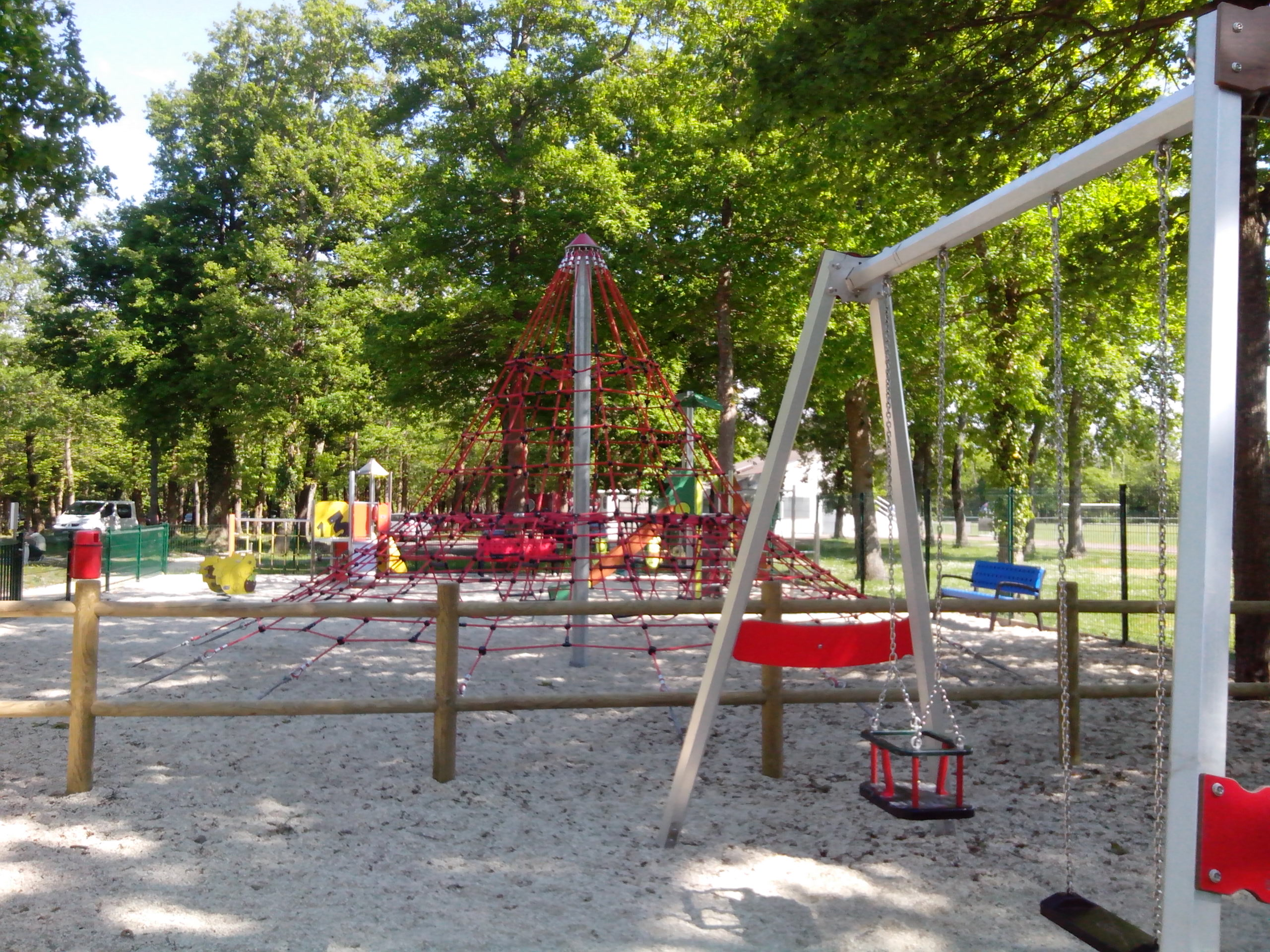
The playground of Etaules, open to children from 1 year old.

The cantonal leisure centre is located in the commune and is open to children from 3 years old. It is a Summer camp without accommodation offering crafts, expression workshops, games, and activities (tree climbing, swimming, horseback riding, etc.). Mini-camps are organized during the summer. Finally, the "Maison de La Treille" at La Tremblade is open to youths aged 13 to 18 years. It offers sports activities, workshops, and outings (surfing, paintball, diving, etc.). It also offers a room with video games and internet access. Young people can also submit their own projects.

The town has a playground dedicated to children 1 to 12 years since December 2013. Designed as a 'Espace multiloisirs ", it is located close to the main stadium and sports facilities of the municipality (skate park, fitness trail). Arranged with the assistance of the company "Quali-Atlantic City", which is responsible for the manufacturing and installation, it consists of six different structures: a game "Squirrel" spring (from 1 to 6 years ), a swing (from 2 to 8 years), a "castle" structure (ladders, climbing net, slide and tunnel - from 2 to 6 years), a "palm tree" structure (net climb, descent mast, slide - from 2 to 12 years), a "pyramid" structure (climbing net - from 6 years) and a portico with two swings.

This recreation area for children reinforces the existing supply in neighboring municipalities including Arvert, which also has a "Parc de Loisirs" of equipment provided to the youngest.

=== Media ===
==== Television ====
The transmitters at Royan-Vaux-sur-Mer and Niort-Maisonnay allow the reception of 18 free channels of Digital terrestrial television (TNT) across the whole commune including the local France 3 Poitou-Charentes station. On 31 May 2009, the high-power transmitter was among the first to broadcast a new multiplex which allowed the reception of the first transmissions of High-definition television (HD).

==== Radio ====
Most national radio stations present in the department can be heard in the commune. Departmental information is relayed by public radio station France Bleu La Rochelle. The local radio stations that can be heard in the commune are mainly:

- Vogue Radio (a local radio station of the La Tremblade agglomeration whose studios are in Arvert and which is transmitted throughout the peninsula, including Royan),
- Demoiselle FM (general broadcasting from Rochefort with studios in Saint-Georges-de-Didonne)
- Terre Marine FM (general broadcasting from Fouras)
- Mixx radio (techno, dance, and electronic music broadcasting from Cognac and retransmitted by the Saintes transmitter)
- RCF Accords Charente-Maritime (religious broadcasting from La Rochelle).
- Wit FM (general broadcasting from Bordeaux) can sometimes be heard but randomly depending on weather conditions.

==== Press ====
Local press is represented by the daily Sud Ouest, headquartered in Bordeaux, which has a local edition from Royan.

==== Broadband Internet ====
Two Main distribution frame are located in the commune. In 2013, they are unbundled by several alternative operators (SFR, Free, and Bouygues Telecom) in addition to the incumbent operator, Orange. ADSL, ADSL2+, Re-ADSL 2, and ADSL television are available in the commune.

=== Worship ===
Etaules belongs to the Roman Catholic Diocese of La Rochelle and Saintes which has been a sub-division of the Ecclesiastical province of Poitiers since 2002 (Ecclesiastical Province of Bordeaux before that date) and the Deanery of Royan. The parish is included in the Parish of the Arvert Peninsula centred on La Tremblade.

Etaules houses a Church of the Reformed Church where there are services on some Sundays at 10:30am, alternating between La Tremblade, Marennes, Arvert, and Chaillevette.

Other religions do not have a place of worship in the town.

== Economy ==
The commune is at the centre of an attractive labour pool: the employment zone of Royan (coming from the partition of the former employment zone of Saintonge maritime, which included many communes of Pays Rochefortais, Pays Marennes-Oleron and Pays Royannais), with 27,753 jobs in 2008. The Employment zone of Royan is, with that of La Rochelle, the most dynamic region in Poitou-Charentes with both enjoying "an economic fabric and a dynamic demography" (INSEE). Growth is particularly strong due to the development of tertiary activities.

186 establishments were identified in the commune by INSEE on 31 December 2010 - mostly very small businesses: 30.6% with from 1-9 employees and only 4.3% over 10 employees. The sectors of oyster farming and agriculture remain important in the community, the two of them having 23.7% of employees. Thirty oyster farms are located in Etaules, mostly in the two ports of Les Grandes Roches and Orivol who operate all the production, refining, and shipping of oysters from the Marennes-Oléron basin.

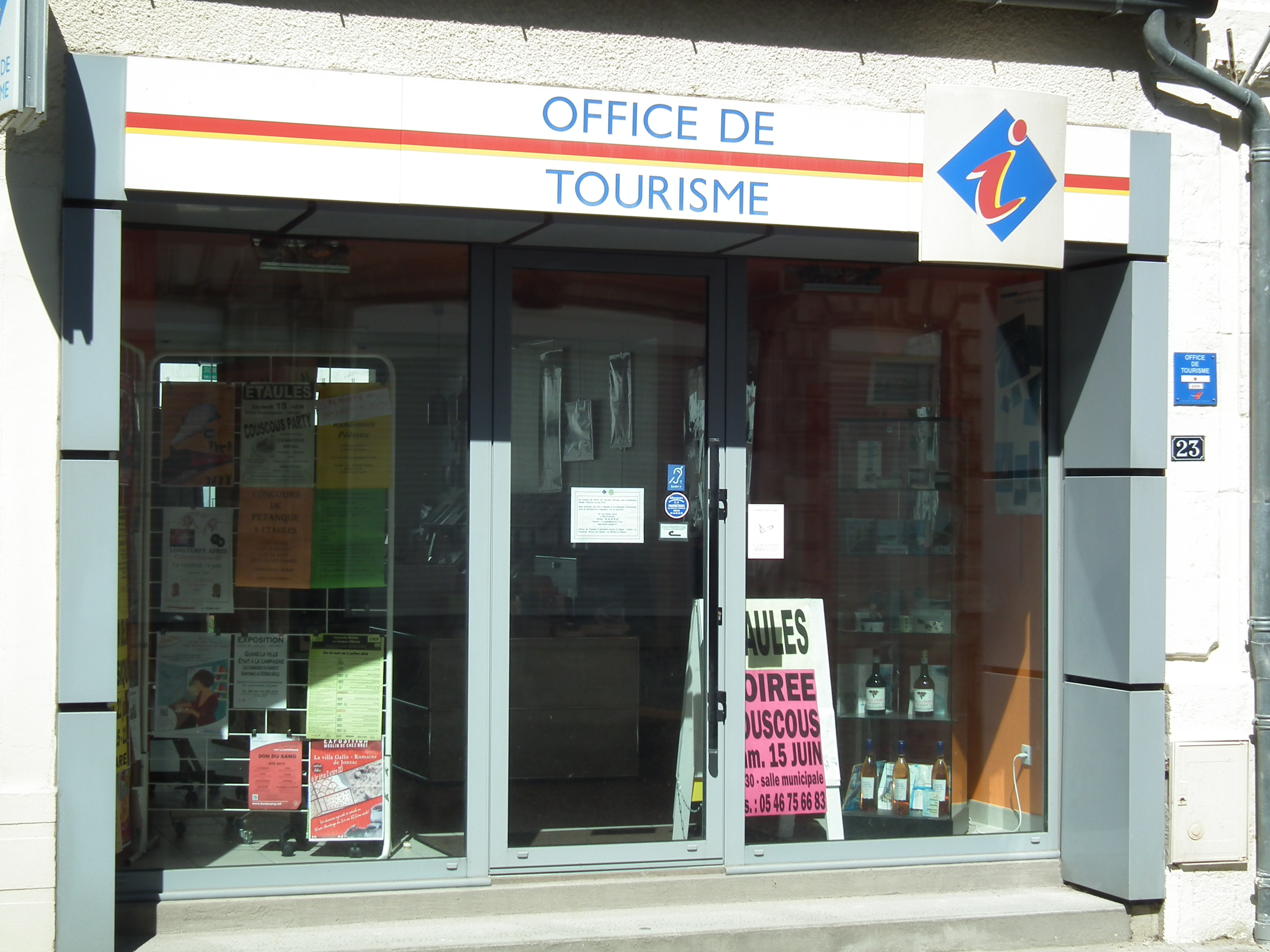
The tourist office on Charles Hervé street.

Trades and services are booming as a consequence of the development of the area and the benefits of tourism which does not only concern the coastal communities. The proximity of resorts on the Côte de Beauté (Saint-Palais-sur-Mer, La Palmyre, and also Ronce-les-Bains ) and a pine forest on the outskirts of the town (Forest of la Coubre) account for a growing increase in tourism which has helped in the establishment of appropriate infrastructure (campsites, guest houses and accommodation "Cap France") and a tourist office in the city centre. In 2010, commerce, services (for people and business), and tourism together employed 47.3% of the work force. The construction sector, which is in third place, has also had great development and employs 16.7% of the work force: a figure to be compared with the departmental average which is 10.6%. Public administration, education, health, and social welfare employ 9.6% of the workforce and Industry, which is only slightly represented in the commune, only employs barely 2.7% of the work force.

The commune has many shops that complement those already present in the neighbouring communes of La Tremblade and Arvert: these three towns form a single entity closely linked at the macro-economic level. The shops are concentrated in the town centre, essentially in the Charles Hervé street, La Granderie street and "Place de Verdun". The town centre has two supermarkets (Coop and Vival), two bakeries, one butcher, one library/newsagent, two restaurant (Italian and one fast-food), one bar, two estate agents, a computer store, and two hair salons. The nearby city of Arvert has a supermarket (Carrefour City) surrounded by a small mall with a petrol station, an ALDI hard-discount store and a Super U hypermarket (2,985 square metres of sales area).

The nearest major shopping area are in Royan (CC Val Lumière and Hyper Intermarché in Vaux-sur-Mer and CC Royan II and E. Leclerc in Royan).

=== Culture ===
Cultural facilities

Etaules has a Public Library located on Charles Hervé street.

Saintongeais language

Map showing the linguistic area of Saintongeais in Charentes and North-Gironde

The commune is located in the linguistic area of Saintonge, a dialect belonging to the family of Langues d'oïl branch of the Romance languages, which also includes French, Angevin, Picard, and Poitevin with which it is often grouped in the broader classification of Poitevin-Saintongeais.

Saintongeais (saintonjhais) is the vernacular spoken in the former provinces of Aunis, Saintonge, and Angoumois. It is also called Charentais or patois Charentais. Speakers are called patoisants. Saintongeais strongly influenced Acadian and therefore, by extension, Cajun. Quebecois was influenced by dialects such as Norman, Francien, and Saintongeais.

The Saintongeais language has many features in common with languages such as Cajun or Acadian which is explained by the Saintonge origins of some of the emigrants to New France in the 17th century.

Gastronomy

Saintonge gastronomy is mainly focused on three types of products: the products of the land, the sea, and the vine.

Pork preparations dominate the regional cuisine:

- gratons or grillons, kinds of Rillettes based on fried meats and preserved in their fat,
- gigorit or gigourit, a Jugging combining blood, throat, liver, and onions, sauce de la pire, onions, and local white wine.

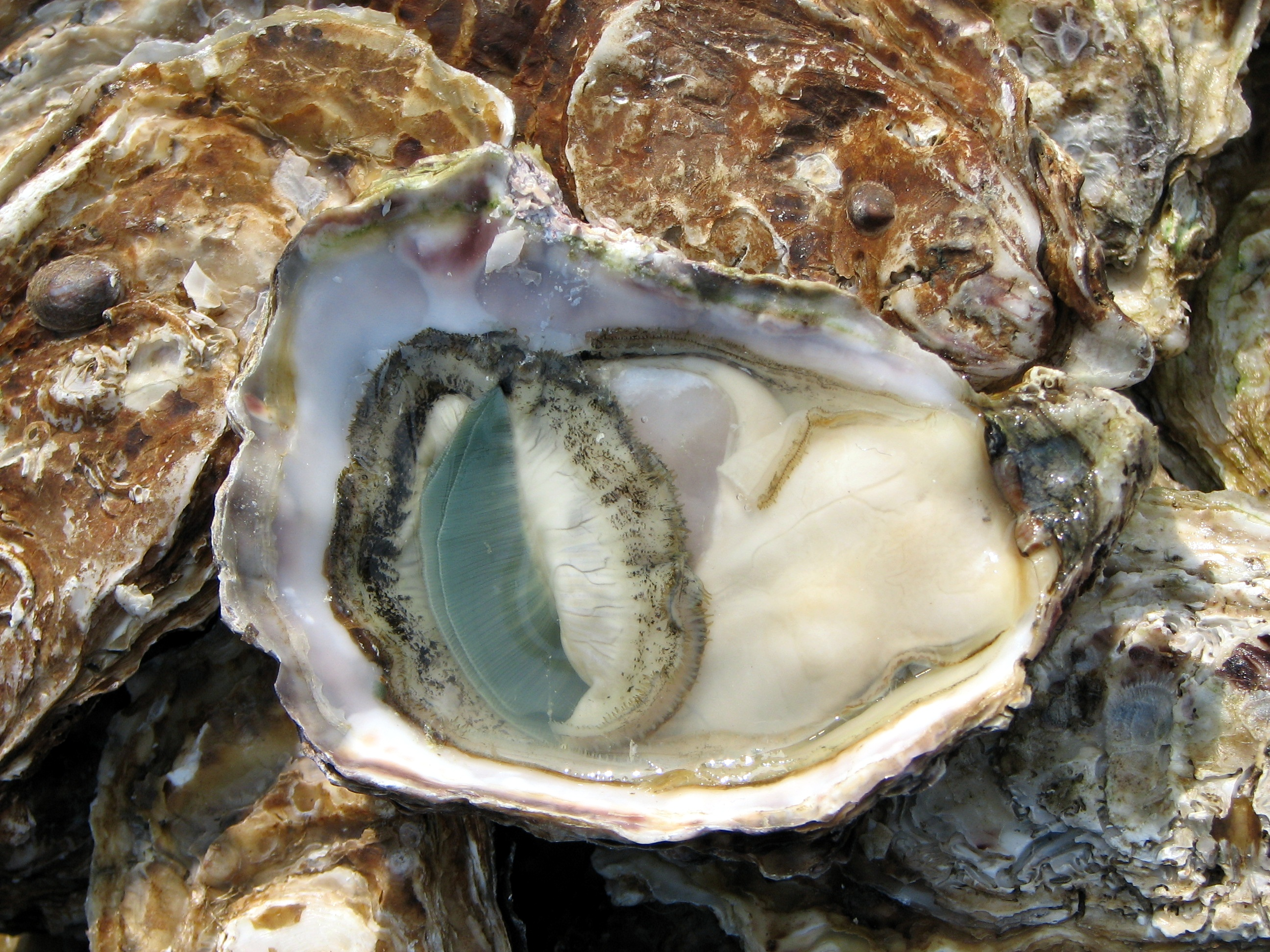
Oysters from Marennes-Oléron basin.

The Saintonge kitchen includes many recipes for cagouilles, the local name of the brown garden snail. Saintonge meat is especially cooked "à la charentaise" - i.e. cooked in a broth accented with white wine, garlic, and bread crumbs.

Among other local specialties there are the pibales (Eels) (fry of eel caught in the Gironde, speciality of Mortagne-sur-Gironde and Blaye), oysters from Marennes-Oléron, sardines of Royan, thyeusses de gueurnouilles (Frog legs), and sanglette - a cake prepared with chicken blood and cooked onions.

Traditional desserts are from peasant cuisine: Millas (cornflour cake, found in much of the South-West of France), galette charentaise (Charente waffle) in Charentes-Poitou butter, or "merveilles" (doughnuts).

Etaules is located in the wine production area of "ordinary wood".

== Gallery ==
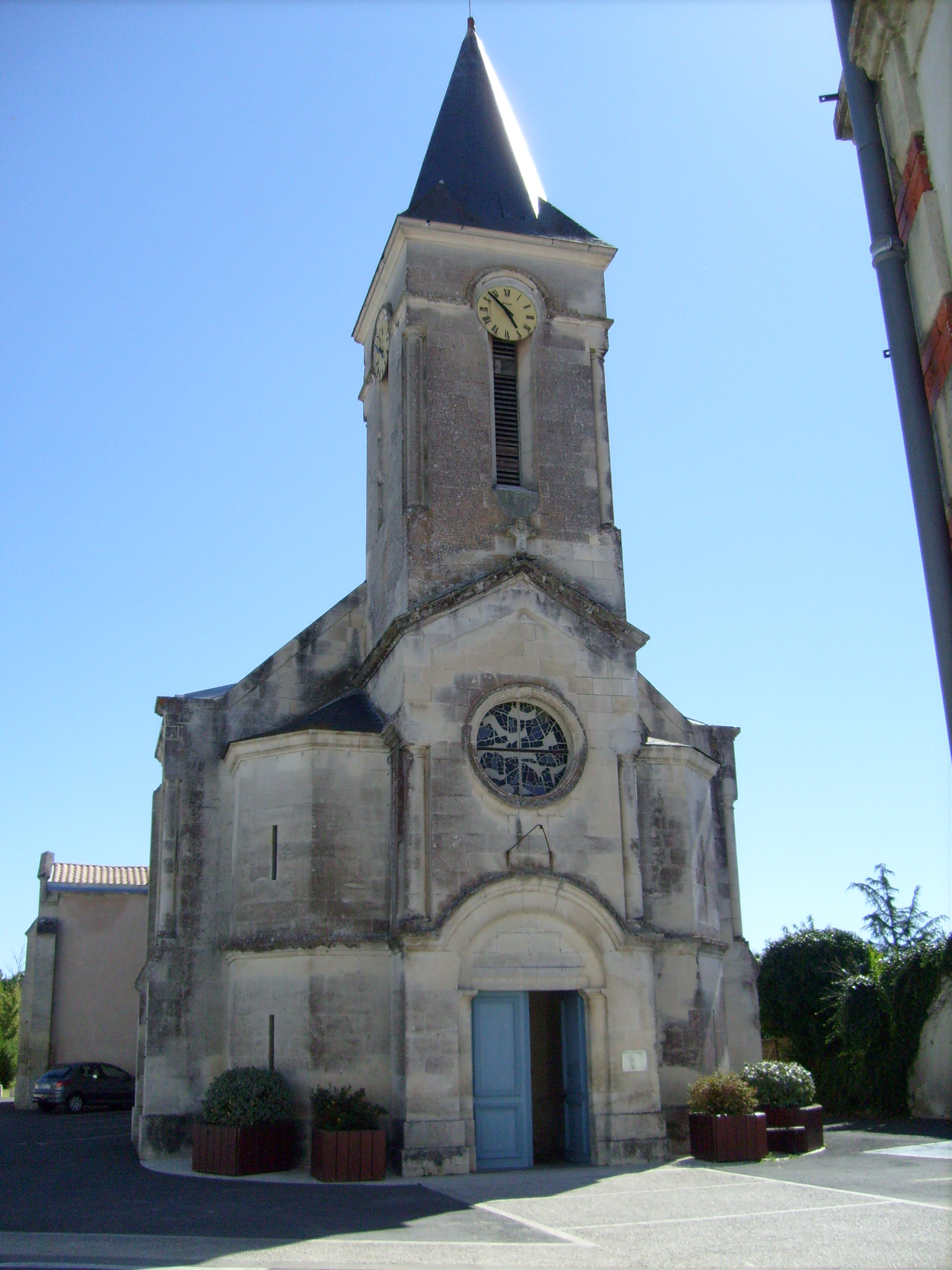

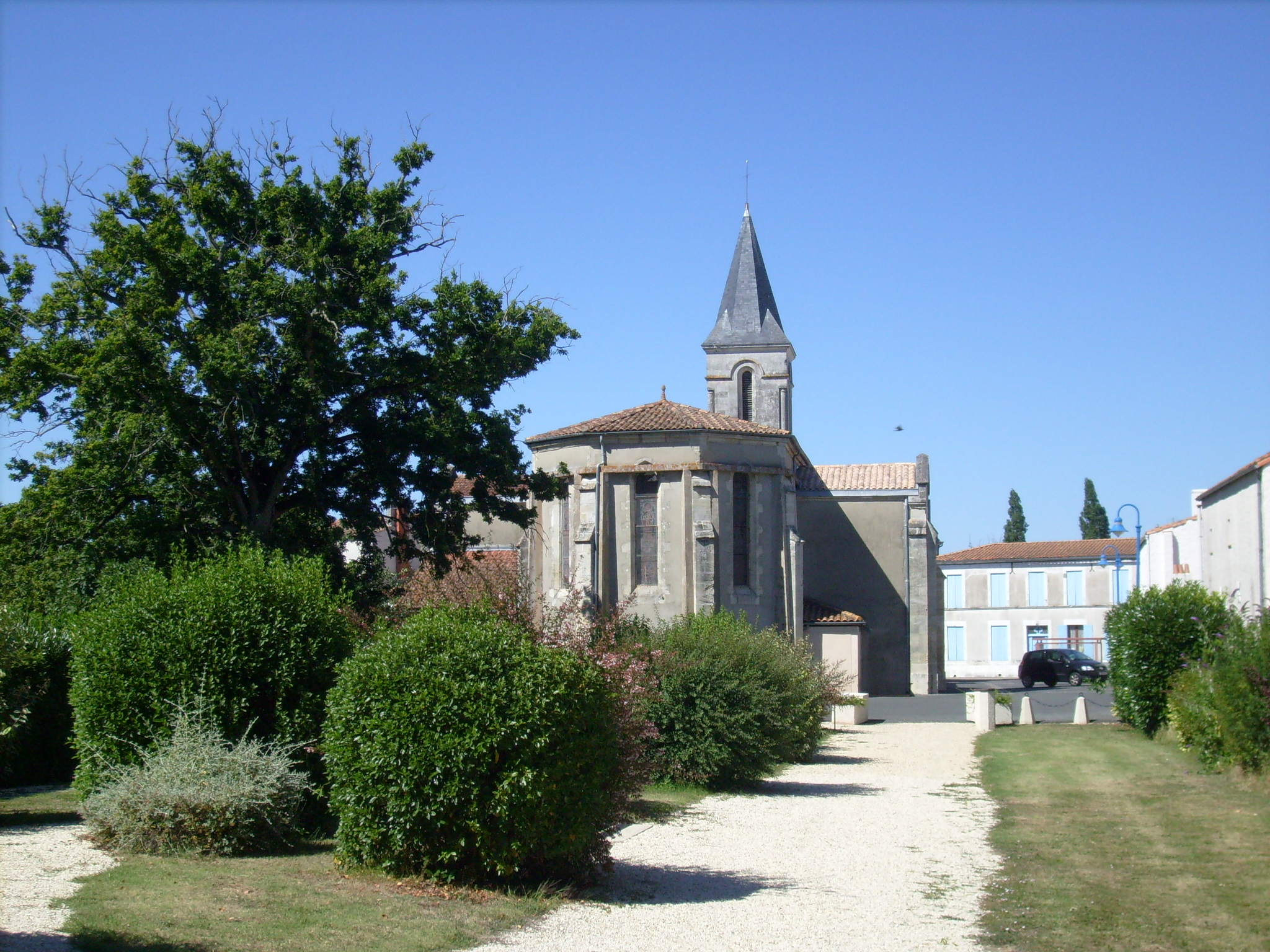

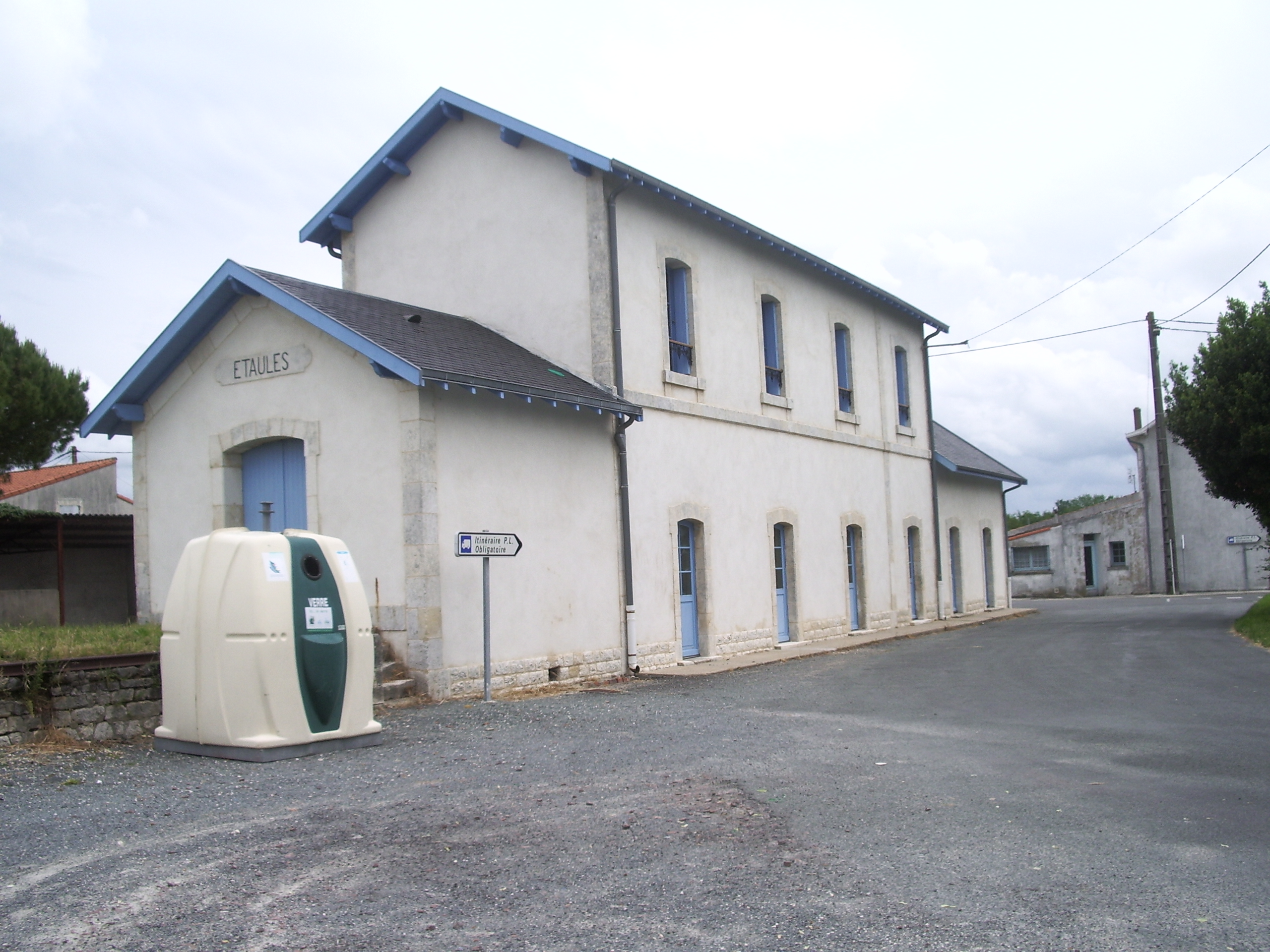

== See also ==
- Communes of the Charente-Maritime department
