= Luftflotte 3 =

Military unit of the Luftwaffe

Luftflotte 3 (Air Fleet 3) was one of the primary divisions of the German Luftwaffe in World War II. It was formed on 1 February 1939 from Luftwaffengruppenkommando 3 in Munich and redesignated Luftwaffenkommando West (Air Command West) on 26 September 1944. This Luftwaffe detachment was based in German-occupied areas of Northern France, the Netherlands, Belgium, and Vichy France, to support the Axis power's forces in area. Its command offices were in Paris, France (on 26 June 1944).

== Strategic Reconnaissance ==
- Stab/FAGr.123 (Toussus le Noble – Buc)
- 4.(F)/123 (Saint-André-de-l'Eure)
- 5.(F)/123 (Monchy-Breton)
- 1.(F)/121 (Toussus le Noble – Buc)

== II.Fliegerkorps (II.Air Corps) Chartres ==
Fliegerführer West (Flight Director in West Area/Land Air Attack)

=== Tactical Reconnaissance ===
- Stab/NAGr.13 (Chartres)
- 1./NAGr.13 (Chartres)
- 3./NAGr.13 (Laval)

=== Land Air Attack ===
- III./SG 4 (Clermont-Ferrand)
- III./SG 4 (Detach) (Avord)

== IX. Fliegerkorps (IX.Air Corps) Beauvais-Lille ==
=== Strategic Reconnaissance ===
- 3.(F)/122 (Soesterberg)
- 6.(F)/123 (Cormeilles)

=== Bombers(Medium) ===
- Stab/KG 2 (Gilze en Rijen)
- I./KG 2 (Gilze en Rijen)
- II./KG 2 (Gilze en Rijen)
- III./KG 2 (Hesepe)
- Stab/KG 6 (Melun-Villaroche)
- I./KG 6 (Melun-Villaroche)
- II./KG 6 (Melun-Villaroche)
- III./KG 6 (Melun-Villaroche)
- 16./KG 6(JABO/Rapid) (Soesterberg)
- Stab/KG 30 (Zwischenhan)
- I./KG 30 (Leck)
- 4./KG 51 (JABO/Rapid) (Soesterberg)
- 5./KG 51(JABO/Rapid) (Gilze en Rijen)
- 6./KG 51(JABO/Rapid) (Soesterberg)
- Stab/KG 54 (Eindhoven)
- I./KG 54 (Eindhoven)
- III./KG 54 (Eindhoven)
- III./KG 66 (Montdidier)
- (Eins)St. IV./KG 101 (Saint-Dizier)
- Stab(KG)/LG 1 (Melsbroek)
- I.(KG)/LG 1 (Le Culot)
- II.(KG)/LG 1(Melsbroek)

=== JABO (Fighter-Bombers/Incursion strike groups) ===
- I.(Jb)/SKG 10 (Tours)

== X.Fliegerkorps (X.Air Corps) Angers ==
=== Special duties/long-distance operations ===
- 1./KG 200 (Mont-de-Marsan)
- 1./KG 200(Detach) (Bordeaux–Mérignac)
- II/KG 200 (Biscarrosse)

=== Strategic/Maritime Reconnaissance (Ultra Long Range) ===
- Stab/FAGr.5 (Mont-de-Marsan)
- 1.(F)/5 (Mont-de-Marsan)
- 2.(F)/5 (Mont-de-Marsan)
- 4.(F)/5 (Nantes)
- 3.(F)/123 (Corme-Écluse)
- 1.(F)/SAGr.129 (Biscarrosse)
- 1.(F)/JG.52 "BF 109"

=== Bombers (Heavy) Submarine Support/Merchant Strike (Long Range) ===
- Stab/KG 40 (Bordeaux–Mérignac)
- 1./KG 40 (Toulouse–Blagnac)
- 2./KG 40 (Bordeaux–Mérignac)
- II./KG 40 (Bordeaux–Mérignac)
- 7./KG 40 (Saint-Jean-d'Angély)
- 8./KG 40 (Cognac)
- 9./KG 40 (Cognac)

=== 2.Fliegerdivision (2.Air Division) Montfrin ===
==== Strategic/Tactical/Maritime Reconnaissance (Medium-Short Range) ====
- 1.(F)/33 (St.Martin)
- 2./NAGr.13 (Cuers)
- 2./SAGr.128 (Berre)

=== Bombers (Medium) ===
- Stab/KG 26 (Montpellier)
- II./KG 26 (LT) (Valence)
- III./KG 26 (LT) (Montpellier)
- III./KG 26 (LT)(Detach) (Valence)
- Stab/KG 77 (Salon-de-Provence)
- I./KG 77 (LT) (Orange-Caritat)
- III./KG 77 (LT) (Orange-Caritat)
- 6./KG 77 (Istres)
- 4./KG 76 (Istres)
- 6./KG 76 (Istres)
- Stab/KG 100 (Toulouse–Francazal)
- III./KG 100 (Toulouse–Francazal)

== II.Jagdkorps (II.Fighter Corps) Chantilly ==
=== Jagdabschnittführer 4 (Fighter Direction 4°) St Pol-Brias ===
==== Fighters ====
- Stab/JG 1 (St.Quentin–Clastres)
- I./JG 3 (St.Quentin–Clastres)
- I./JG 5 (St.Quentin–Clastres)
- II./JG 11 (Mons en Chaussée)
- I./JG 301 (Épinoy)
- Stab/JG 27 (Champfleury)
- I./JG 27 (Vertus)
- III./JG 27 (Connantre)
- IV./JG 27 (Champfleury)

==== Night Fighters ====
- Stab/NJG 4 (Chenay)
- I./NJG 4 (Florennes)
- III./NJG 4 (Junvincourt)
- Stab/NJG 5 (Haguenau)
- I./NJG 5 (Saint-Dizier)
- III./NJG 5 (Athies-sous-Laon)

=== Jagdabschnittführer 5 (Fighter Director 5) Bernay ===
==== Fighters ====
- Stab/JG 2 (Creil)
- I./JG 2 (Creil)
- II./JG 2 (Creil)
- III./JG 2 (Creil)
- Stab/JG 3 (Évreux)
- II./JG 3 (Guyancourt)
- III./JG 3 (Mareilly)
- Stab/JG 11 (Le Mans)
- I./JG 11 (Le Mans)
- I0./JG 11 (Le Mans)
- I./JG 1 (Alençon)
- II./JG 1 (Alençon)
- Stab/JG 26 (Guyancourt)
- I./JG 26 (Guyancourt)
- II./JG 26 (Guyancourt)

==== Night Fighters ====
- Stab/NJG 2 (Coulommiers)
- I./NJG 2 (Châteaudun)
- II./NJG 2 (Coulommiers)
- II./NJG 4 (Coulommiers)

=== Jagdabschnittführer Bretagne (Fighter Direction in Brittany) Brest ===
==== Fighters ====
- II./JG 53 (Vannes)

=== Jagdabschnittführer Südfrankreich (Southern France Fighter Direction) Aix ===
==== Fighters ====
- 1./JGr 200 (Orange-Caritat)
- 2./JGr 200 (Avignon)
- 3./JGr 200 (Orange-Caritat)

== Jagdlehrer-Gr Bordeaux (Instruction Wing in Bordeaux sector) ==
- Jagdabschnittführer Bordeaux (Fighter Direction in Bordeaux) Bordeaux-Mérignac
- Zerstörer (Heavy Fighters)
  - Stab/ZG 1 (Bordeaux–Mérignac)
  - 1./ZG 1 (Corme-Écluse)
  - 3./ZG 1 (Corme-Écluse)
  - 2./ZG 1 (Châteauroux)
  - III./ZG 1 (Cazaux)

== Luftwaffe Special Strike Units ==
- Jet Bombers/Jet Fighter-Bombers
  - (R)"Blitz" KG 76 (Istres)
  - II.St.(JABO)/KG 51 (Soesterberg)
- Mistel Special Section
  - 2. (Mistel I) /KG 101 (Saint-Dizier)
  - II. (Mistel I) -(Detach)/KG 200 (Saint-Dizier)
- Bombers with V-1 Launchers
  - Stab/KG 3 (Venlo)
  - II./KG 3 (also known as I./KG.5) (Venlo)
  - I./KG 53 "Legion Condor" (Gilze en Rijen)
  - III./KG 53 "Legion Condor" (Gilze en Rijen)
- Luftwaffe V-1 fixed/mobile ramps units; operated near Calais (France), and in Belgium and the Netherlands.
  - Untergruppenbezeichnung FZG (Flakzielgerät) 76 (also known as 5th Flak Division (W), later as Armeekorps zur Vergeltung)
  - I./155 Artillerie Abt (W)
  - II./155 Artillerie-Abt (W)
  - III./155 Artillerie-Abt (W)
- Luftwaffe special transport units(1944–45); based in Muhldorf, Bavaria, and composed of Helicopters:
  - Focke-Achgelis Fa 223 Drachen
  - Flettner Fl 265
  - Flettner 282B Kolibri
- Heer/Luftwaffe V-2 mobile ramps sections
- Division zur Vergeltung(Div.z.V.); led by Heer and SS Commanders, working along with Luftwaffe personnel and facilities. They operated in France, Belgium and the Netherlands.
- "Div.z.V." Nordgruppe
  - 444° Artillerie-Abt
  - 485° Artillerie- Abt (also known as Artillerie Regiment z. V. 902)
  - 2°./485° Artillerie-Abt
- "Div.z.V." Südgruppe
  - 500° Waffen SS Artillerie-Abt (also known as 500° SS Werfer Abt.)
  - 836° Artillerie-Abt (also known as Artillerie Regiment zur Vergeltung 901)
- Heer V-4 "Rheinbote" Mobile ramps units
  - I./709 Artillerie Abt
- Heer V-3 Artillery group
  - 705° Artillerie Abt.

== Abbreviations ==
- FAGr = Fernaufklärungsgruppe = Long-range/strategic Reconnaissance aircraft.
  - Gruppe = equivalent to a USAAF Group.
- JG = Jagdgeschwader = Fighters.
  - Geschwader = equivalent to a USAAF Wing.
- JGr = Jagdgruppe = Fighters.
- KG = Kampfgeschwader = Bombers.
- LG = Lehrgeschwader = Operational Training.
- NAGr = Nahaufklärungsgruppe = Short-range/tactical Observation aircraft.
- NJG = Nachtjagdgeschwader = Night Fighters
- SAGr = Seeaufklärungsgruppe = Maritime Patrol aircraft
- SKG = Schnellkampfgeschwader = Fast Bombers.
- St = Staffel = equivalent to a RAF Squadron.
- ZG = Zerstörergeschwader = Twin engined diurnal heavy fighters.

== Commanding officers ==
Flag for the Chief of a Luftflotte

- Generalfeldmarschall Hugo Sperrle, 1 February 1939 – 23 August 1944
- Generaloberst Otto Deßloch, 23 August 1944 – 22 September 1944
- Generalleutnant Alexander Holle, 22 September 1944 – 26 September 1944

redesignated to Luftwaffenkommando West

- Generalleutnant Alexander Holle, 28 September 1944 – 15 November 1944
- Generalleutnant Joseph Schmid, 16 November 1944 – 27 April 1945
- Generalleutnant Martin Harlinghausen, 28 April 1945 – 8 May 1945

=== Chief of staff ===
- Generalmajor Maximilian Ritter von Pohl, 1 February 1939 – 10 June 1940
- Oberst Günther Korten, 11 June 1940 – 31 December 1940
- Generalmajor Karl Koller, 1 January 1941 – 23 August 1943
- Generalleutnant Hermann Plocher, 1 October 1943 – 26 September 1944

redesignated to Luftwaffenkommando West

- Oberst Hans Wolters, September 1944 – March 1945
- Oberst Heinrich Wittmer, March 1945 – May 1945
