= Forest of la Coubre =

Forest in the region of Nouvelle-Aquitaine, France

Coordinates: 45.725°N 1.205°W

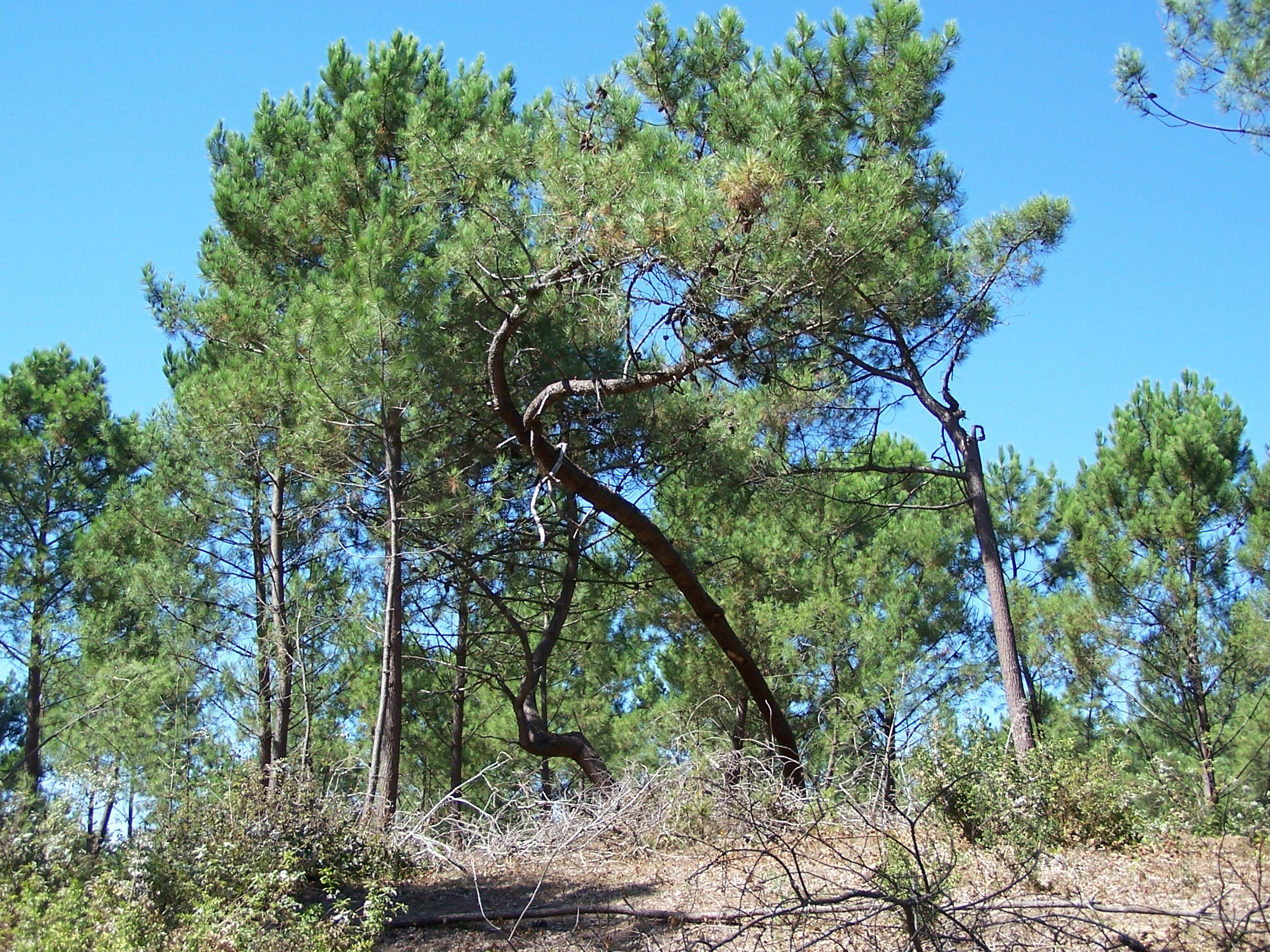
The forest of la Coubre near La Tremblade.

The Forest of la Coubre (French: forêt de la Coubre) is a large forest in the region of Nouvelle-Aquitaine, France, near the city of Royan. Its area is roughly 7916 hectares, making it the third largest forêt domaniale (French State's inalienable domaine) of the north of the region, behind forest of la Double and the forest d'Horte.

Around its remaining perimeter, it contains or is adjacent to numerous communes including La Tremblade, Les Mathes, Arvert, Étaules, Saint-Augustin and Saint-Palais-sur-Mer. It borders the Atlantic Ocean, the Gironde estuary and the forest of the Combots d'Ansoine. The forest of la Coubre is composed mostly of maritime pine. This pine plantation was started in the 19th century by Médéric de Vasselot de Régné in the Pointe de la Coubre area, to halt erosion.

The EuroVelo bicycle route (Atlantic Coast route) crosses the forest.
