= Medis =

Medis may refer to:

- Médis, a commune in Nouvelle-Aquitaine, France
- A colloquial name for Medborgarplatsen, a square in Stockholm, Sweden
