= Communauté d'agglomération Royan Atlantique =

Royan Atlantique
- Communauté d'agglomération
- Interactive map of Royan Atlantique
- Coordinates: 45°38′N 00°57′W
- Country: France
- Region: Nouvelle-Aquitaine
- Department: Charente-Maritime
- No. of communes: {{{nbcomm}}}
- Established: 2001
- Area: 603.9 km^{2} (233.2 sq mi)
- Population (2019): 83,661
  - Density: 138.5/km^{2} (358.8/sq mi)
- Website: www.agglo-royan.fr

Communauté d'agglomération Royan Atlantique is the communauté d'agglomération, an intercommunal structure, centred on the town of Royan. It is located in the Charente-Maritime department, in the Nouvelle-Aquitaine region, southwestern France. Created in 2001, its seat is in Royan. Its area is 603.9 km^{2}. Its population was 83,661 in 2019, of which 18,419 in Royan proper.

== Composition ==
The communauté d'agglomération consists of the following 33 communes:

1. Arces
2. Arvert
3. Barzan
4. Boutenac-Touvent
5. Breuillet
6. Brie-sous-Mortagne
7. Chaillevette
8. Le Chay
9. Chenac-Saint-Seurin-d'Uzet
10. Corme-Écluse
11. Cozes
12. L'Éguille
13. Épargnes
14. Étaules
15. Floirac
16. Grézac
17. Les Mathes
18. Médis
19. Meschers-sur-Gironde
20. Mornac-sur-Seudre
21. Mortagne-sur-Gironde
22. Royan
23. Sablonceaux
24. Saint-Augustin
25. Saint-Georges-de-Didonne
26. Saint-Palais-sur-Mer
27. Saint-Romain-de-Benet
28. Saint-Sulpice-de-Royan
29. Saujon
30. Semussac
31. Talmont-sur-Gironde
32. La Tremblade
33. Vaux-sur-Mer
