= Semussac =

- Commune
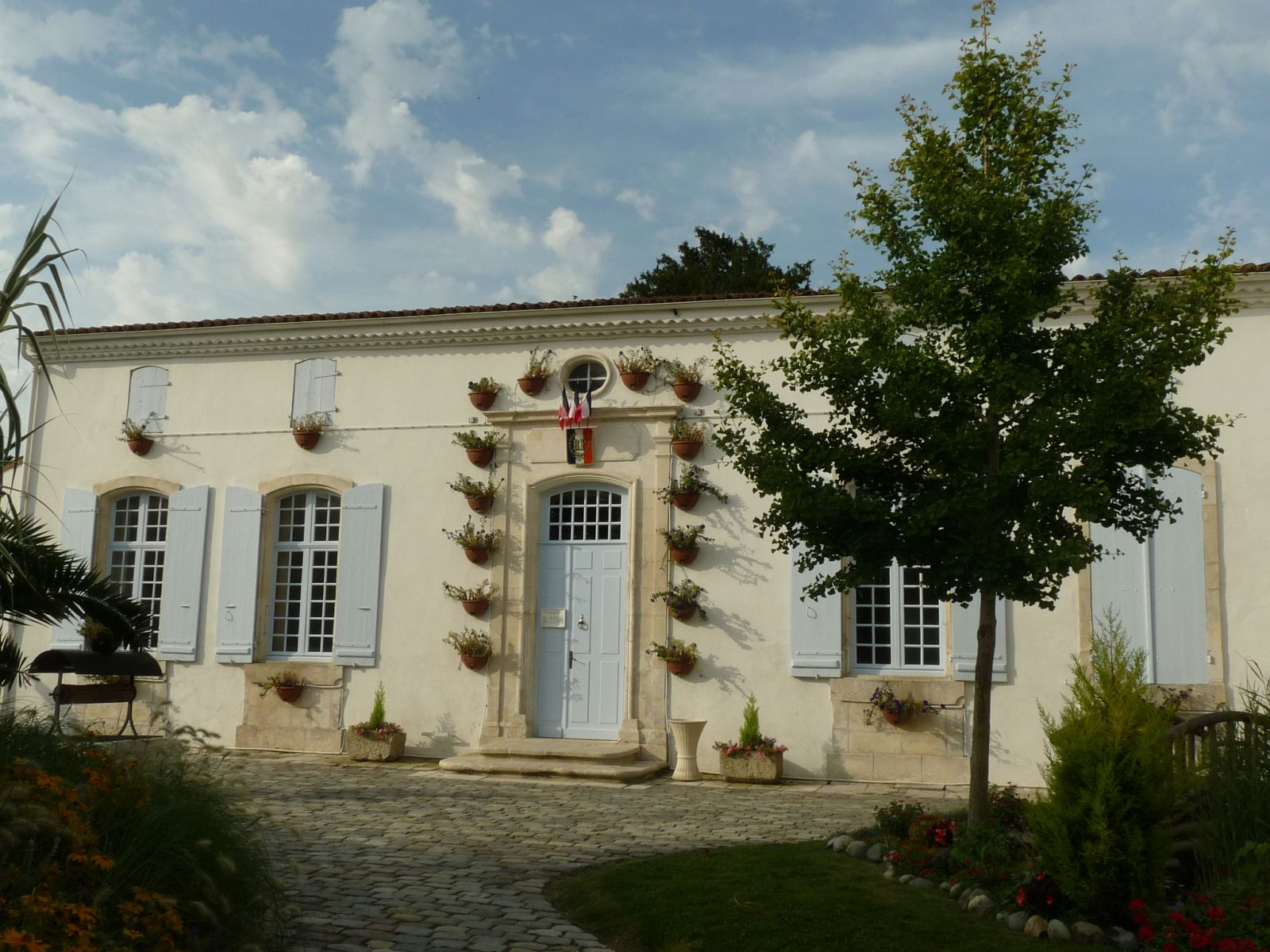
- The town hall in Semussac

- Coat of arms
- Location of Semussac
- Location within France Location within Nouvelle-Aquitaine
- Coordinates: 45°36′00″N 0°54′45″W
- Country: France
- Region: Nouvelle-Aquitaine
- Department: Charente-Maritime
- Arrondissement: Saintes
- Canton: Saujon
- Intercommunality: CA Royan Atlantique

Government
  - Mayor (2024–2026): Ghislaine Guillen
- Area^{1}: 24.85 km^{2} (9.59 sq mi)
- Highest elevation: 42 m (138 ft)
- Lowest elevation: 0 m (0 ft)
- Population (2023): 2,585
  - Density: 104.0/km^{2} (269.4/sq mi)
- Time zone: UTC+01:00 (CET)
  - Summer (DST): UTC+02:00 (CEST)
- INSEE/Postal code: 17425 /17120
- ^{1} French Land Register data, which excludes lakes, ponds, glaciers > 1 km^{2} (0.386 sq mi or 247 acres) and river estuaries.

Semussac (French pronunciation: [semysak]) is a commune in the Charente-Maritime department in southwestern France.

== Population ==
Historical population
Year	Pop.	±% p.a.
1968	902	—
1975	933	+0.48%
1982	1,006	+1.08%
1990	1,208	+2.31%
1999	1,417	+1.79%
2007	1,829	+3.24%
2012	2,128	+3.07%
2017	2,333	+1.86%
2023	2,585	+1.72%
Source: INSEE

== See also ==
- Communes of the Charente-Maritime department
