= Mornac-sur-Seudre =

- Commune
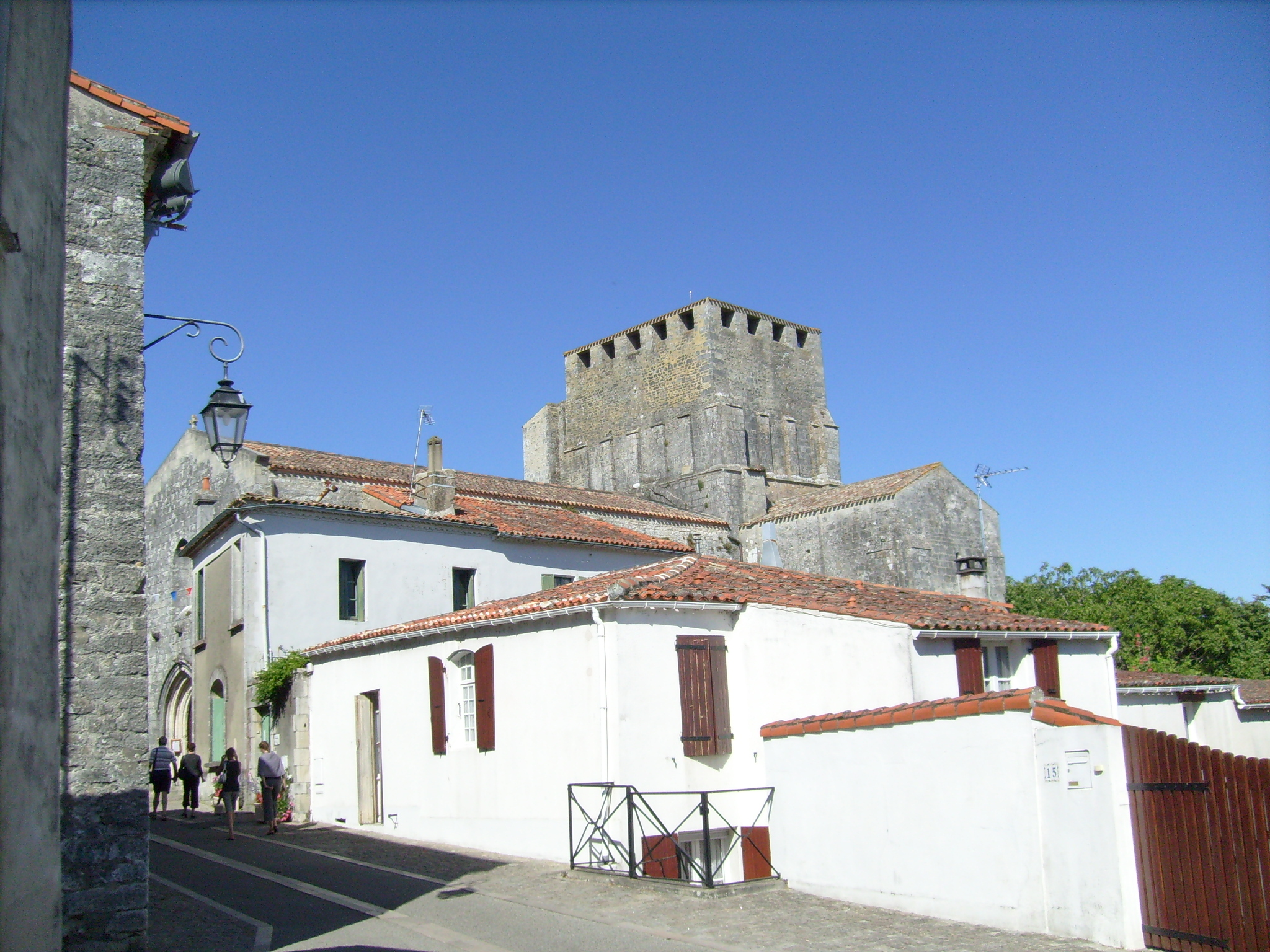
- Houses and the church in Mornac-sur-Seudre
- Location of Mornac-sur-Seudre
- Location within France Location within Nouvelle-Aquitaine
- Coordinates: 45°42′38″N 1°01′38″W
- Country: France
- Region: Nouvelle-Aquitaine
- Department: Charente-Maritime
- Arrondissement: Rochefort
- Canton: La Tremblade
- Intercommunality: CA Royan Atlantique

Government
  - Mayor (2020–2026): Emmanuel Cretin
- Area^{1}: 9.5 km^{2} (3.7 sq mi)
- Elevation: 5 m (16 ft)
- Highest elevation: 13 m (43 ft)
- Lowest elevation: 0 m (0 ft)
- Population (2023): 877
  - Density: 92/km^{2} (240/sq mi)
- Time zone: UTC+01:00 (CET)
  - Summer (DST): UTC+02:00 (CEST)
- INSEE/Postal code: 17247 /17113
- ^{1} French Land Register data, which excludes lakes, ponds, glaciers > 1 km^{2} (0.386 sq mi or 247 acres) and river estuaries.

Mornac-sur-Seudre (French pronunciation: [mɔʁnak syʁ sødʁ], literally Mornac on Seudre) is a commune in the Charente-Maritime department in southwestern France. It is a member of Les Plus Beaux Villages de France (The Most Beautiful Villages of France) Association. It is known for the oysters that are cultivated in the surrounding marshes alongside the Seudre river.

== Population ==
Historical population
Year	Pop.	±% p.a.
1968	596	—
1975	592	−0.10%
1982	558	−0.84%
1990	640	+1.73%
1999	652	+0.21%
2007	737	+1.54%
2012	839	+2.63%
2017	841	+0.05%
2023	877	+0.70%
Source: INSEE

== See also ==
- Communes of the Charente-Maritime department
