= Canton of Saujon =

Coordinates: 45.67°N 0.93°W

The canton of Saujon is an administrative division of the Charente-Maritime department, western France. Its borders were modified at the French canton reorganisation which came into effect in March 2015. Its seat is in Saujon.

It consists of the following communes:

1. Le Chay
2. Corme-Écluse
3. L'Éguille
4. Médis
5. Sablonceaux
6. Saint-Romain-de-Benet
7. Saint-Sulpice-de-Royan
8. Saujon
9. Semussac
