= L'Éguille =

- Commune
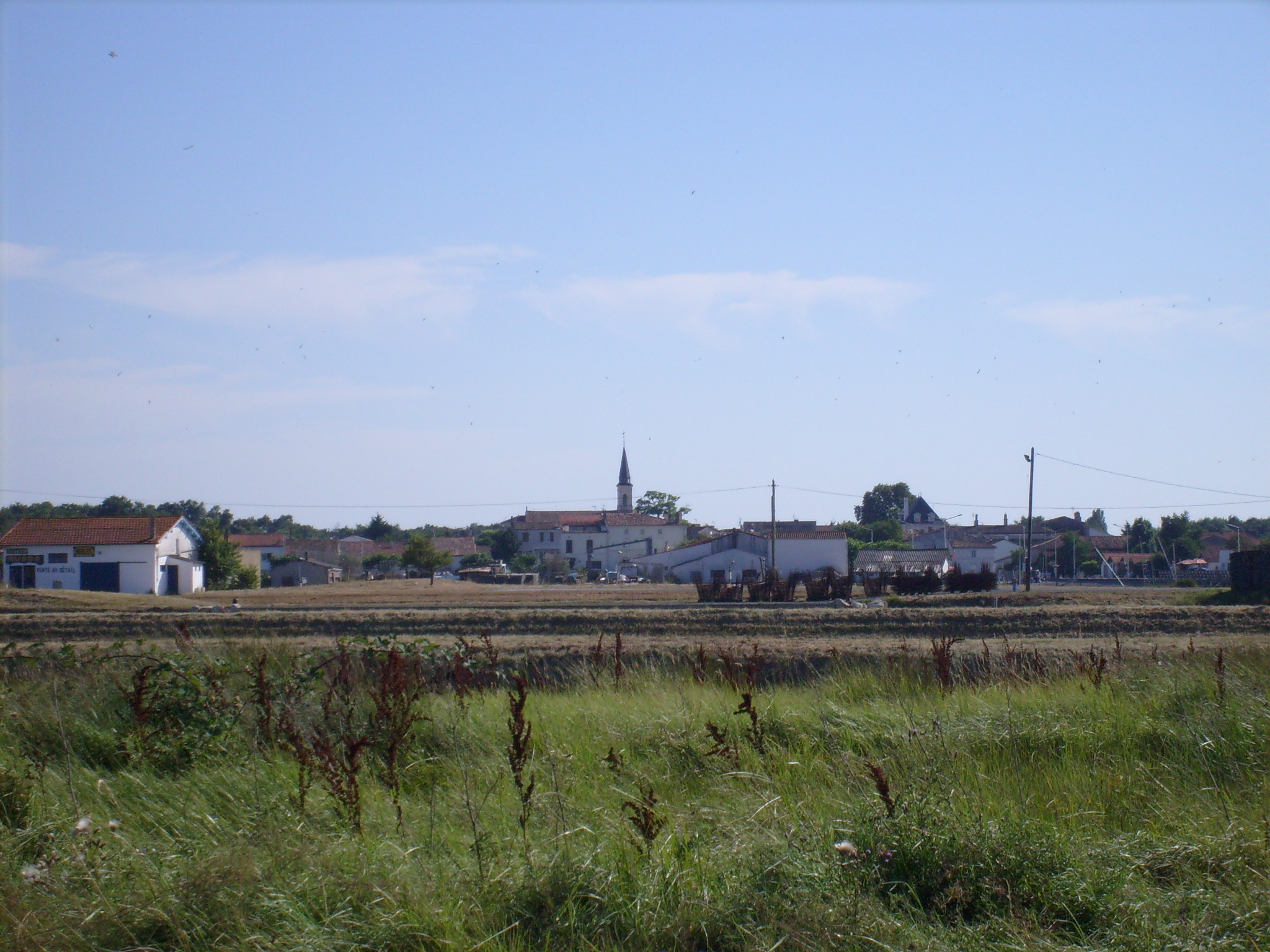
- A general view of L'Éguille

- Coat of arms
- Location of L'Éguille
- Location within France Location within Nouvelle-Aquitaine
- Coordinates: 45°42′28″N 0°58′34″W
- Country: France
- Region: Nouvelle-Aquitaine
- Department: Charente-Maritime
- Arrondissement: Rochefort
- Canton: Saujon
- Intercommunality: CA Royan Atlantique

Government
  - Mayor (2022–2026): Myriam Portier
- Area^{1}: 5.49 km^{2} (2.12 sq mi)
- Highest elevation: 11 m (36 ft)
- Lowest elevation: 0 m (0 ft)
- Population (2023): 910
  - Density: 170/km^{2} (430/sq mi)
- Time zone: UTC+01:00 (CET)
  - Summer (DST): UTC+02:00 (CEST)
- INSEE/Postal code: 17151 /17600
- ^{1} French Land Register data, which excludes lakes, ponds, glaciers > 1 km^{2} (0.386 sq mi or 247 acres) and river estuaries.

L'Éguille (French pronunciation: [leɡɥij]) is a commune in the Charente-Maritime department in southwestern France.

== Population ==
Historical population
Year	Pop.	±% p.a.
1968	767	—
1975	660	−2.12%
1982	670	+0.22%
1990	722	+0.94%
1999	758	+0.54%
2007	898	+2.14%
2012	886	−0.27%
2017	872	−0.32%
2023	910	+0.71%
Source: INSEE

== See also ==
- Communes of the Charente-Maritime department
