= Sablonceaux =

- Commune
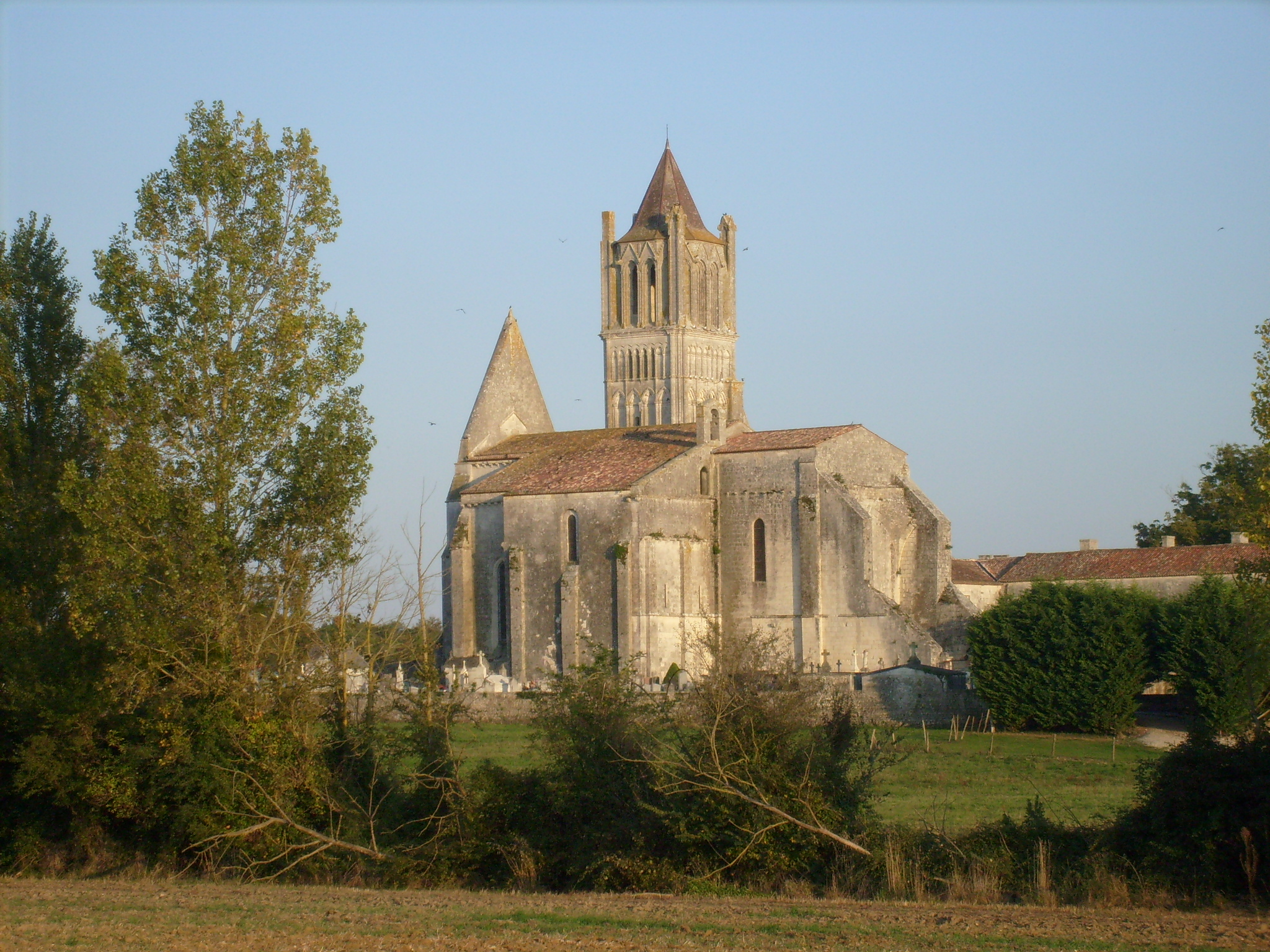
- Sablonceaux Abbey
- Location of Sablonceaux
- Location within France Location within Nouvelle-Aquitaine
- Coordinates: 45°43′00″N 0°53′00″W
- Country: France
- Region: Nouvelle-Aquitaine
- Department: Charente-Maritime
- Arrondissement: Saintes
- Canton: Saujon
- Intercommunality: CA Royan Atlantique

Government
  - Mayor (2020–2026): Lysiane Gougnon
- Area^{1}: 22.09 km^{2} (8.53 sq mi)
- Highest elevation: 40 m (130 ft)
- Lowest elevation: 3 m (9.8 ft)
- Population (2023): 1,458
  - Density: 66.00/km^{2} (170.9/sq mi)
- Time zone: UTC+01:00 (CET)
  - Summer (DST): UTC+02:00 (CEST)
- INSEE/Postal code: 17307 /17600
- ^{1} French Land Register data, which excludes lakes, ponds, glaciers > 1 km^{2} (0.386 sq mi or 247 acres) and river estuaries.

Sablonceaux (French pronunciation: [sablɔ̃so]) is a commune in the Charente-Maritime department in southwestern France.

== Population ==
Historical population
Year	Pop.	±% p.a.
1968	750	—
1975	735	−0.29%
1982	858	+2.24%
1990	1,027	+2.27%
1999	1,023	−0.04%
2007	1,154	+1.52%
2012	1,315	+2.65%
2017	1,397	+1.22%
2023	1,458	+0.71%
Source: INSEE

== See also ==
- Communes of the Charente-Maritime department
