= Le Chay =

- Commune
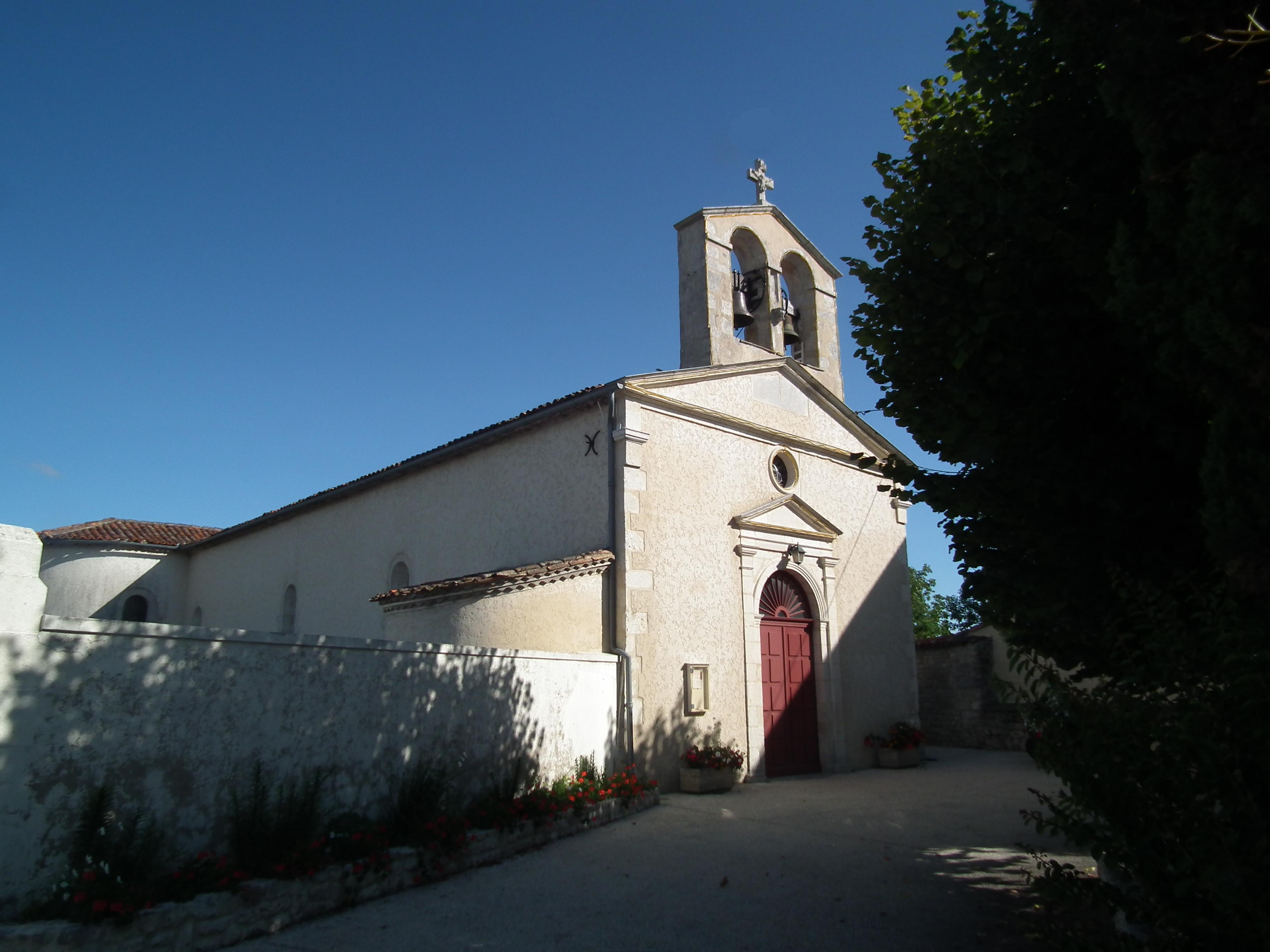
- The church in Le Chay
- Location of Le Chay
- Location within France Location within Nouvelle-Aquitaine
- Coordinates: 45°38′32″N 0°53′46″W
- Country: France
- Region: Nouvelle-Aquitaine
- Department: Charente-Maritime
- Arrondissement: Saintes
- Canton: Saujon
- Intercommunality: CA Royan Atlantique

Government
  - Mayor (2020–2026): Thierry Saintlos
- Area^{1}: 12.01 km^{2} (4.64 sq mi)
- Highest elevation: 21 m (69 ft)
- Lowest elevation: 2 m (6.6 ft)
- Population (2023): 840
  - Density: 70/km^{2} (180/sq mi)
- Time zone: UTC+01:00 (CET)
  - Summer (DST): UTC+02:00 (CEST)
- INSEE/Postal code: 17097 /17600
- ^{1} French Land Register data, which excludes lakes, ponds, glaciers > 1 km^{2} (0.386 sq mi or 247 acres) and river estuaries.

Le Chay (French pronunciation: [lə ʃɛ]) is a commune in the Charente-Maritime department in southwestern France.

== Population ==
Historical population
Year	Pop.	±% p.a.
1968	387	—
1975	374	−0.49%
1982	450	+2.68%
1990	529	+2.04%
1999	562	+0.67%
2007	717	+3.09%
2012	743	+0.71%
2017	767	+0.64%
2023	840	+1.53%
Source: INSEE

== See also ==
- Communes of the Charente-Maritime department
