= Saujon =

- Commune
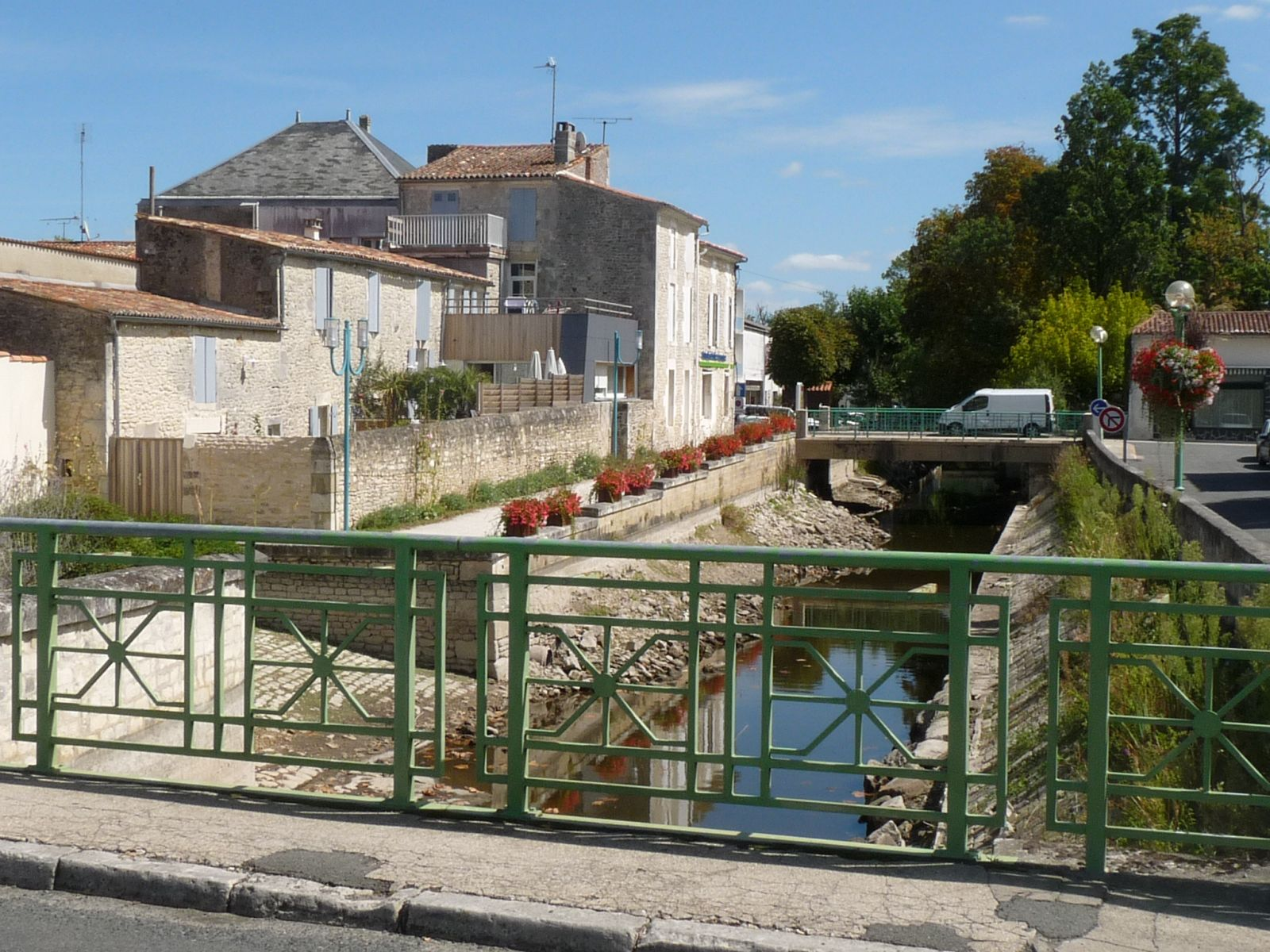
- The Seudre river in Saujon

- Coat of arms
- Location of Saujon
- Location within France Location within Nouvelle-Aquitaine
- Coordinates: 45°40′17″N 0°55′40″W
- Country: France
- Region: Nouvelle-Aquitaine
- Department: Charente-Maritime
- Arrondissement: Saintes
- Canton: Saujon
- Intercommunality: CA Royan Atlantique

Government
  - Mayor (2020–2026): Pascal Ferchaud
- Area^{1}: 18.01 km^{2} (6.95 sq mi)
- Highest elevation: 20 m (66 ft)
- Lowest elevation: 0 m (0 ft)
- Population (2023): 7,440
  - Density: 413/km^{2} (1,070/sq mi)
- Time zone: UTC+01:00 (CET)
  - Summer (DST): UTC+02:00 (CEST)
- INSEE/Postal code: 17421 /17600
- ^{1} French Land Register data, which excludes lakes, ponds, glaciers > 1 km^{2} (0.386 sq mi or 247 acres) and river estuaries.

Saujon (French pronunciation: [soʒɔ̃]) is a commune in the Charente-Maritime department in southwestern France.

== Population ==
Historical population

Year	Pop.	±% p.a.
1793	1,524	—
1800	2,200	+5.38%
1806	2,200	+0.00%
1821	1,837	−1.19%
1831	2,122	+1.45%
1836	2,279	+1.44%
1841	2,217	−0.55%
1846	2,444	+1.97%
1851	2,564	+0.96%
1856	2,826	+1.96%
1861	2,889	+0.44%
1866	2,957	+0.47%
1872	2,891	−0.38%
1876	3,039	+1.26%
1881	3,130	+0.59%
1886	3,292	+1.01%
1891	3,132	−0.99%
1896	3,222	+0.57%
1901	3,355	+0.81%

Year	Pop.	±% p.a.
1906	3,155	−1.22%
1911	3,137	−0.11%
1921	2,852	−0.95%
1926	2,963	+0.77%
1931	3,015	+0.35%
1936	3,063	+0.32%
1946	3,469	+1.25%
1954	3,182	−1.07%
1962	3,428	+0.94%
1968	3,801	+1.74%
1975	4,426	+2.20%
1982	4,777	+1.10%
1990	4,891	+0.30%
1999	5,392	+1.09%
2007	6,404	+2.17%
2012	7,008	+1.82%
2017	7,165	+0.44%
2023	7,440	+0.63%

Source: EHESS and INSEE (1968-2023)

== See also ==
- Communes of the Charente-Maritime department
