= Corme-Écluse =

- Commune
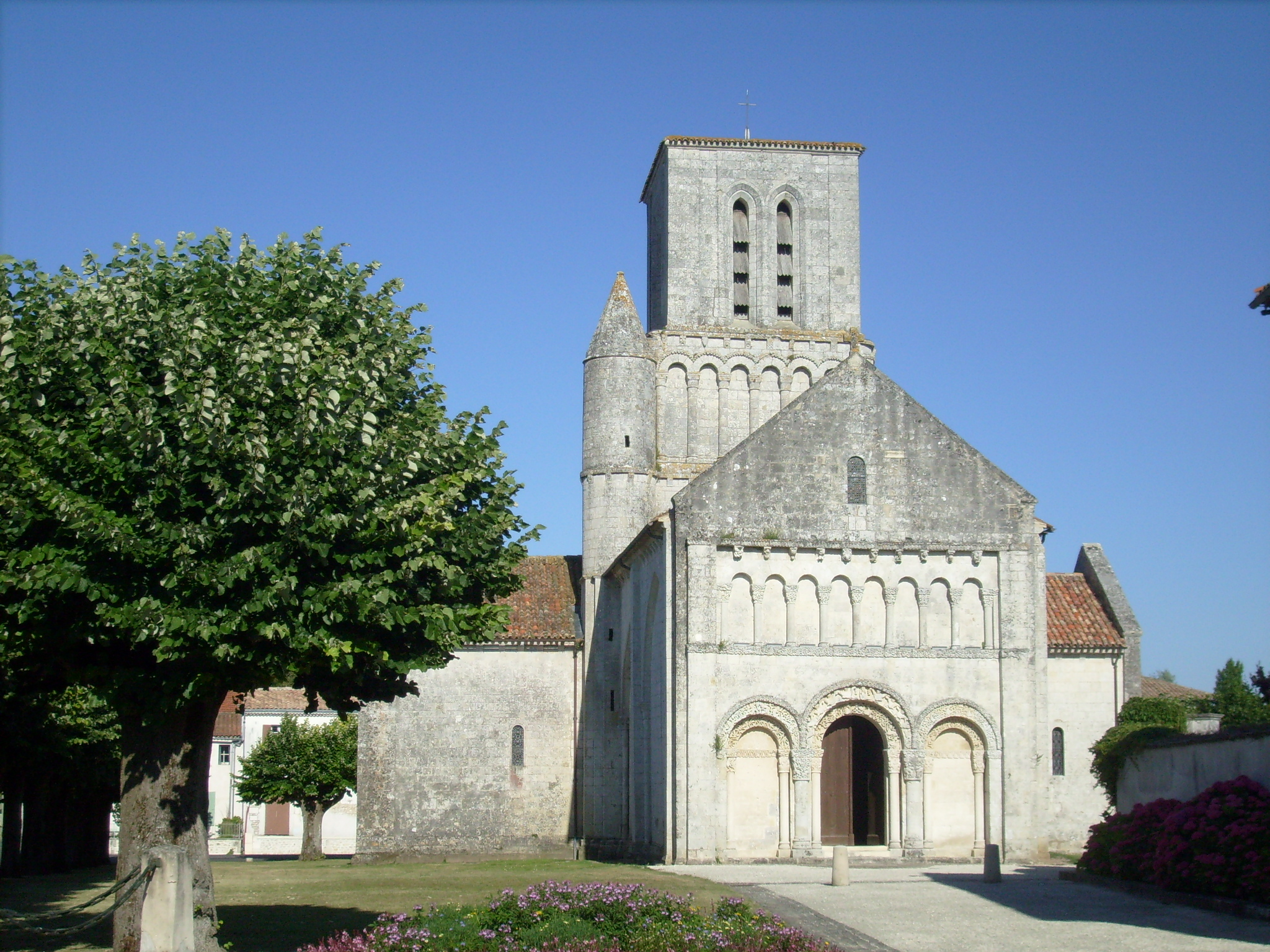
- The church in Corme-Écluse
- Location of Corme-Écluse
- Location within France Location within Nouvelle-Aquitaine
- Coordinates: 45°37′55″N 0°51′12″W
- Country: France
- Region: Nouvelle-Aquitaine
- Department: Charente-Maritime
- Arrondissement: Saintes
- Canton: Saujon
- Intercommunality: CA Royan Atlantique

Government
  - Mayor (2020–2026): Olivier Martin
- Area^{1}: 17.49 km^{2} (6.75 sq mi)
- Highest elevation: 33 m (108 ft)
- Lowest elevation: 5 m (16 ft)
- Population (2023): 1,295
  - Density: 74.04/km^{2} (191.8/sq mi)
- Time zone: UTC+01:00 (CET)
  - Summer (DST): UTC+02:00 (CEST)
- INSEE/Postal code: 17119 /17600
- ^{1} French Land Register data, which excludes lakes, ponds, glaciers > 1 km^{2} (0.386 sq mi or 247 acres) and river estuaries.

Corme-Écluse (French pronunciation: [kɔʁm eklyz]) is a commune in the Charente-Maritime department in southwestern France.

The village is noteworthy for its Romanesque church of the eleventh century, with a single nave and transepts with ogival vaulting. The massive crossing tower is supported on a vaulted cupola on pendentives. The richly sculptural west front, with a porch of three bays and an arcade above, was restored about 1860.

== Population ==
Historical population
Year	Pop.	±% p.a.
1968	627	—
1975	598	−0.67%
1982	651	+1.22%
1990	686	+0.66%
1999	758	+1.12%
2007	983	+3.30%
2012	1,078	+1.86%
2017	1,113	+0.64%
2023	1,295	+2.56%
Source: INSEE

== See also ==
- Communes of the Charente-Maritime department
