= Saint-Sulpice-de-Royan =

- Commune
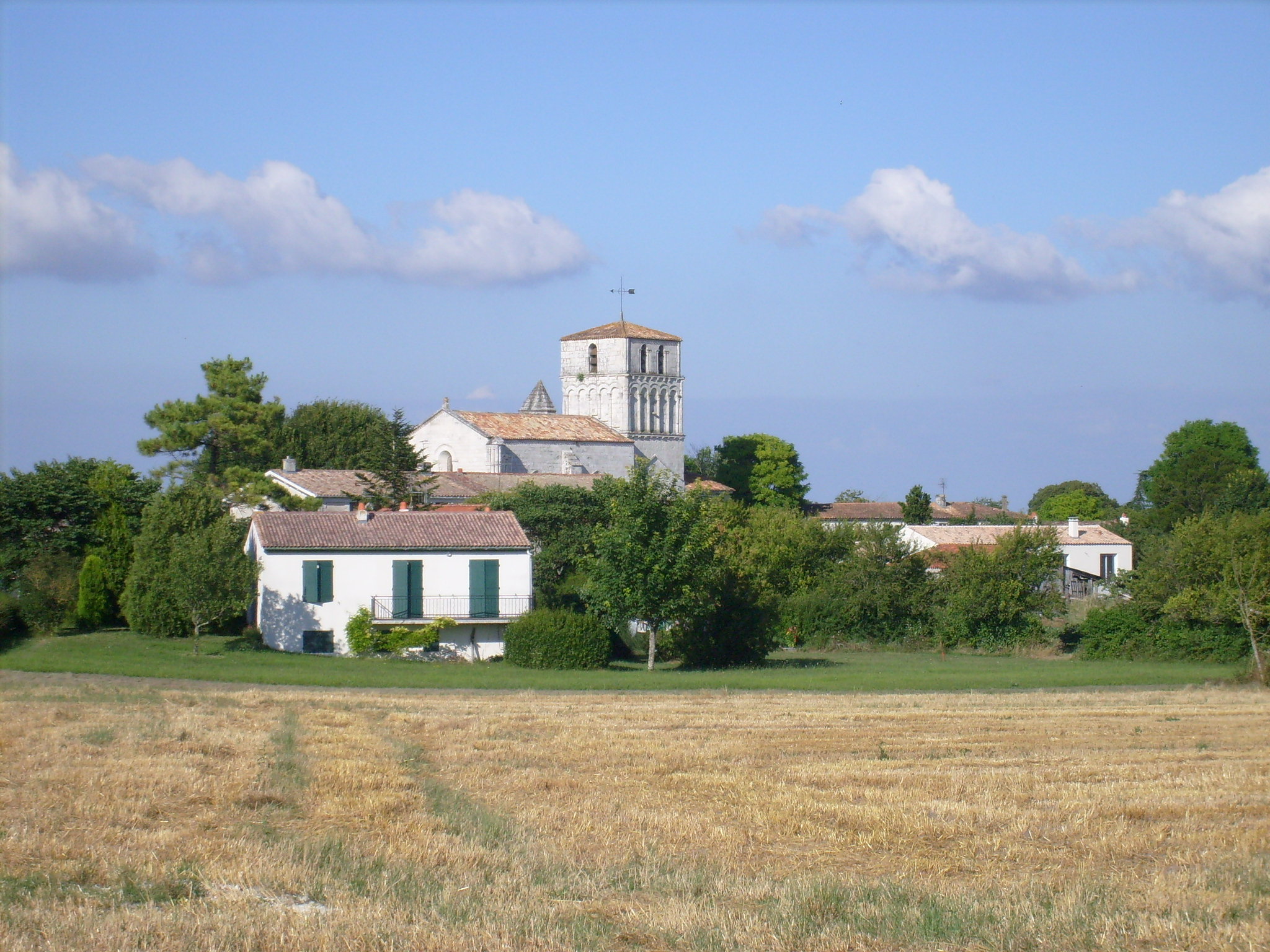
- A general view of Saint-Sulpice-de-Royan
- Location of Saint-Sulpice-de-Royan
- Location within France Location within Nouvelle-Aquitaine
- Coordinates: 45°40′20″N 1°00′37″W
- Country: France
- Region: Nouvelle-Aquitaine
- Department: Charente-Maritime
- Arrondissement: Rochefort
- Canton: Saujon
- Intercommunality: CA Royan Atlantique

Government
  - Mayor (2020–2026): Christian Pitard
- Area^{1}: 20.81 km^{2} (8.03 sq mi)
- Elevation: 22 m (72 ft)
- Highest elevation: 37 m (121 ft)
- Lowest elevation: 1 m (3.3 ft)
- Population (2023): 3,446
  - Density: 165.6/km^{2} (428.9/sq mi)
- Time zone: UTC+01:00 (CET)
  - Summer (DST): UTC+02:00 (CEST)
- INSEE/Postal code: 17409 /17200
- ^{1} French Land Register data, which excludes lakes, ponds, glaciers > 1 km^{2} (0.386 sq mi or 247 acres) and river estuaries.

Saint-Sulpice-de-Royan (French pronunciation: [sɛ̃ sylpis də ʁwajɑ̃]; Occitan: Sent Sulpici de Roian) is a commune in the French department of Charente-Maritime, region of Nouvelle-Aquitaine (formerly Poitou-Charentes), southwestern France.

== Population ==
Historical population
Year	Pop.	±% p.a.
1968	794	—
1975	1,129	+5.16%
1982	1,744	+6.41%
1990	2,101	+2.36%
1999	2,290	+0.96%
2007	2,735	+2.24%
2012	2,895	+1.14%
2017	3,204	+2.05%
2023	3,446	+1.22%
Source: INSEE

== See also ==
- Communes of the Charente-Maritime department
