= Médis =

- Commune
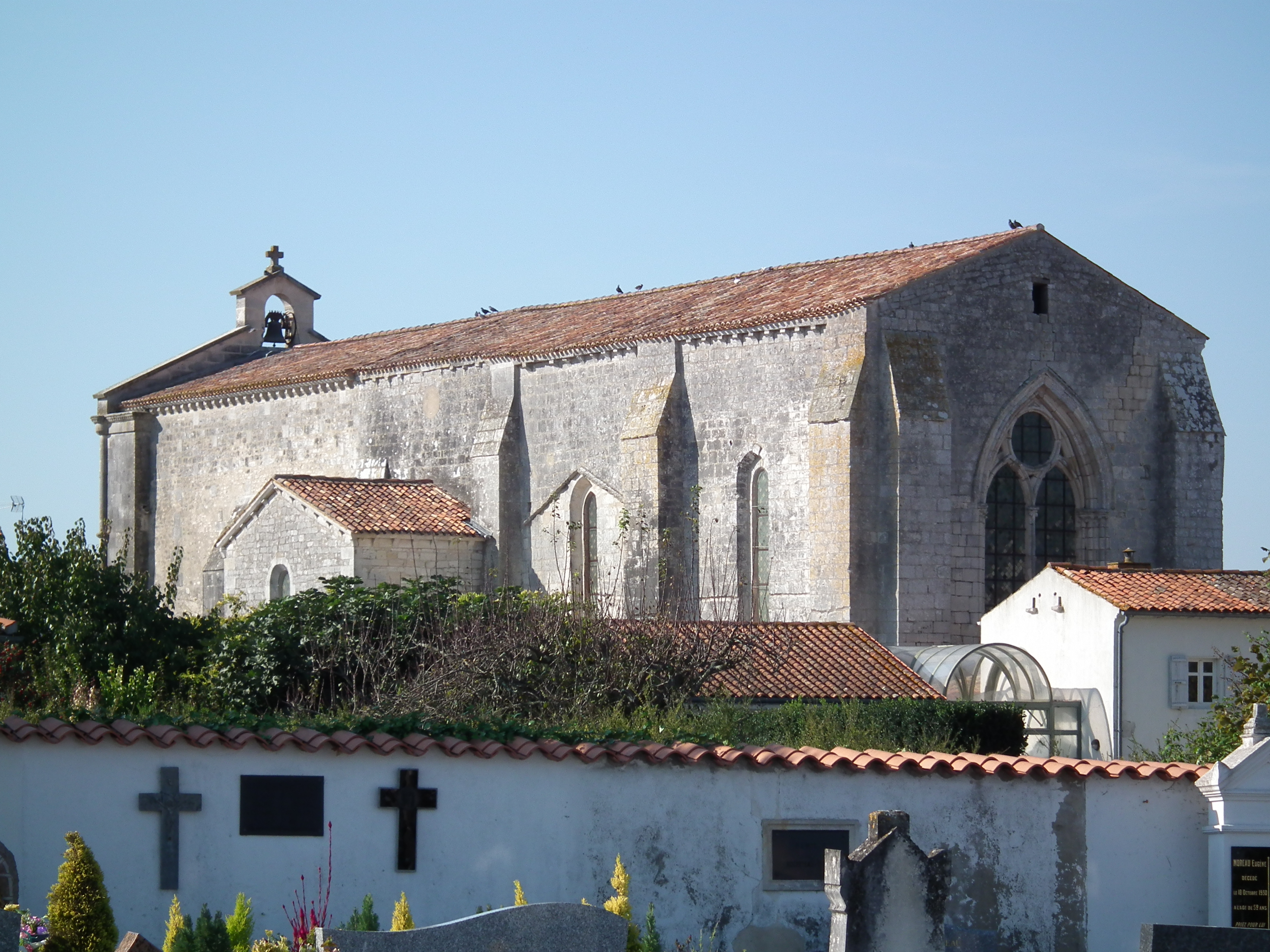
- The church in Médis

- Coat of arms
- Location of Médis
- Location within France Location within Nouvelle-Aquitaine
- Coordinates: 45°38′36″N 0°57′54″W
- Country: France
- Region: Nouvelle-Aquitaine
- Department: Charente-Maritime
- Arrondissement: Saintes
- Canton: Saujon
- Intercommunality: CA Royan Atlantique

Government
  - Mayor (2020–2026): Éric Renoux
- Area^{1}: 23.46 km^{2} (9.06 sq mi)
- Highest elevation: 39 m (128 ft)
- Lowest elevation: 0 m (0 ft)
- Population (2023): 3,157
  - Density: 134.6/km^{2} (348.5/sq mi)
- Time zone: UTC+01:00 (CET)
  - Summer (DST): UTC+02:00 (CEST)
- INSEE/Postal code: 17228 /17600
- ^{1} French Land Register data, which excludes lakes, ponds, glaciers > 1 km^{2} (0.386 sq mi or 247 acres) and river estuaries.

Médis (French pronunciation: [medi]) is a commune in the Charente-Maritime department in southwestern France.

== Population ==
Historical population

Year	Pop.	±% p.a.
1793	941	—
1800	768	−2.86%
1806	692	−1.72%
1821	842	+1.32%
1831	1,005	+1.79%
1836	1,033	+0.55%
1841	1,000	−0.65%
1846	978	−0.44%
1851	952	−0.54%
1856	949	−0.06%
1861	894	−1.19%
1866	882	−0.27%
1872	851	−0.59%
1876	828	−0.68%
1881	810	−0.44%
1886	792	−0.45%
1891	779	−0.33%
1896	735	−1.16%
1901	762	+0.72%

Year	Pop.	±% p.a.
1906	772	+0.26%
1911	737	−0.92%
1921	694	−0.60%
1926	720	+0.74%
1931	729	+0.25%
1936	800	+1.88%
1946	701	−1.31%
1954	863	+2.63%
1962	968	+1.45%
1968	1,128	+2.58%
1975	1,450	+3.65%
1982	1,663	+1.98%
1990	1,965	+2.11%
1999	2,158	+1.05%
2007	2,624	+2.47%
2012	2,806	+1.35%
2017	2,881	+0.53%
2023	3,157	+1.54%

Source: EHESS and INSEE (1968-2023)

== See also ==
- Communes of the Charente-Maritime department
