= Vaux-sur-Mer =

- Commune
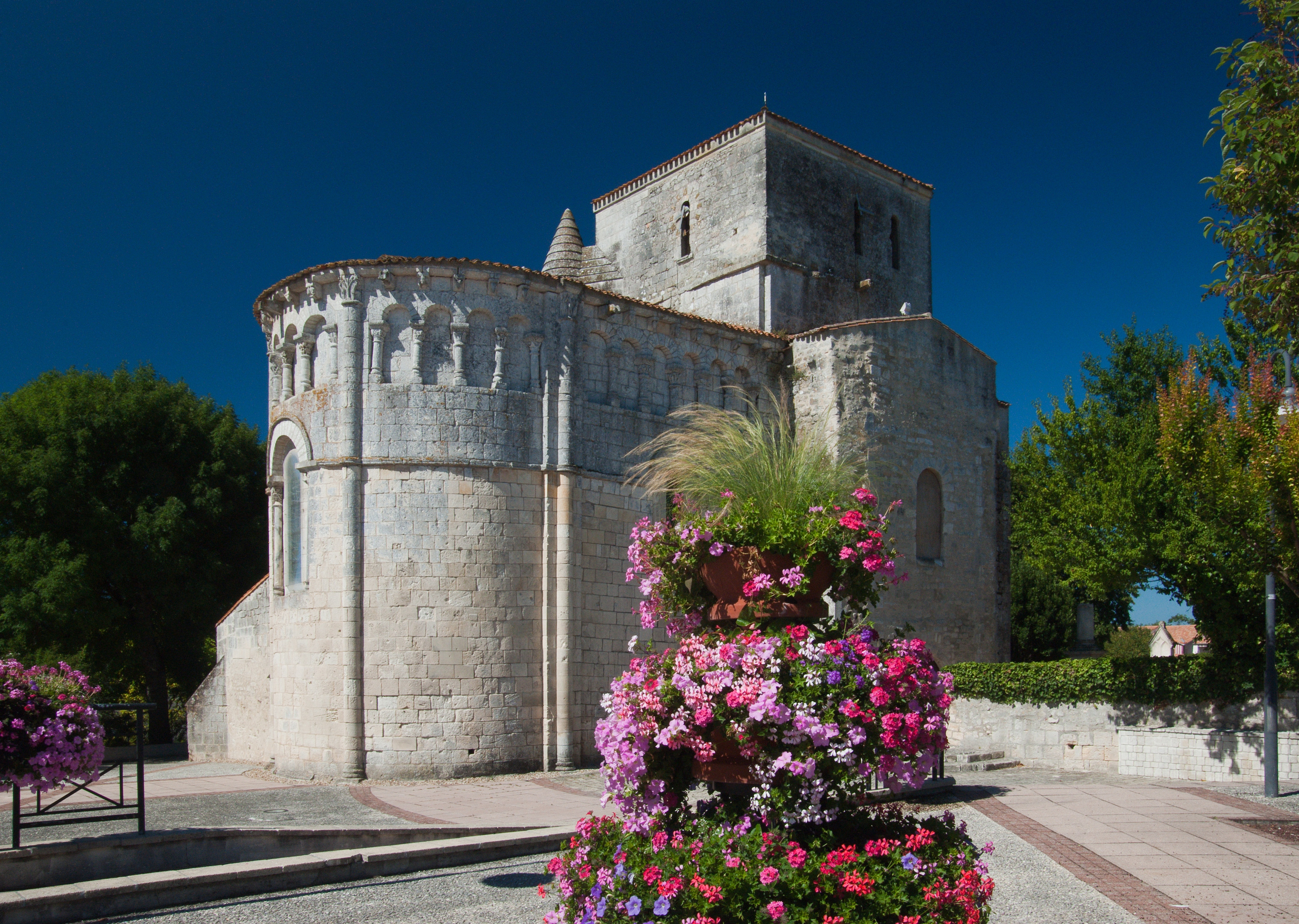
- The church in Vaux-sur-Mer

- Coat of arms
- Location of Vaux-sur-Mer
- Location within France Location within Nouvelle-Aquitaine
- Coordinates: 45°38′42″N 1°03′37″W
- Country: France
- Region: Nouvelle-Aquitaine
- Department: Charente-Maritime
- Arrondissement: Rochefort
- Canton: Royan
- Intercommunality: CA Royan Atlantique

Government
  - Mayor (2020–2026): Patrice Libelli
- Area^{1}: 5.97 km^{2} (2.31 sq mi)
- Highest elevation: 27 m (89 ft)
- Lowest elevation: 0 m (0 ft)
- Population (2023): 4,013
  - Density: 672/km^{2} (1,740/sq mi)
- Time zone: UTC+01:00 (CET)
  - Summer (DST): UTC+02:00 (CEST)
- INSEE/Postal code: 17461 /17640
- ^{1} French Land Register data, which excludes lakes, ponds, glaciers > 1 km^{2} (0.386 sq mi or 247 acres) and river estuaries.

Vaux-sur-Mer (French pronunciation: [vo syʁ mɛʁ]) is a commune in the Charente-Maritime department in southwestern France.

== Population ==
Historical population

Year	Pop.	±% p.a.
1793	367	—
1800	320	−1.94%
1806	332	+0.62%
1821	371	+0.74%
1831	374	+0.08%
1836	387	+0.69%
1841	388	+0.05%
1846	367	−1.11%
1851	406	+2.04%
1856	419	+0.63%
1861	421	+0.10%
1866	406	−0.72%
1872	440	+1.35%
1876	441	+0.06%
1881	485	+1.92%
1886	475	−0.42%
1891	488	+0.54%
1896	531	+1.70%
1901	537	+0.22%

Year	Pop.	±% p.a.
1906	554	+0.63%
1911	605	+1.78%
1921	564	−0.70%
1926	540	−0.87%
1931	611	+2.50%
1936	630	+0.61%
1946	619	−0.18%
1954	1,038	+6.68%
1962	1,368	+3.51%
1968	1,798	+4.66%
1975	2,163	+2.68%
1982	2,481	+1.98%
1990	3,054	+2.63%
1999	3,448	+1.36%
2007	3,785	+1.17%
2012	3,896	+0.58%
2017	3,798	−0.51%
2023	4,013	+0.92%

Source: EHESS and INSEE (1968-2023)

== See also ==
- Communes of the Charente-Maritime department
