= Cozes =

- Commune
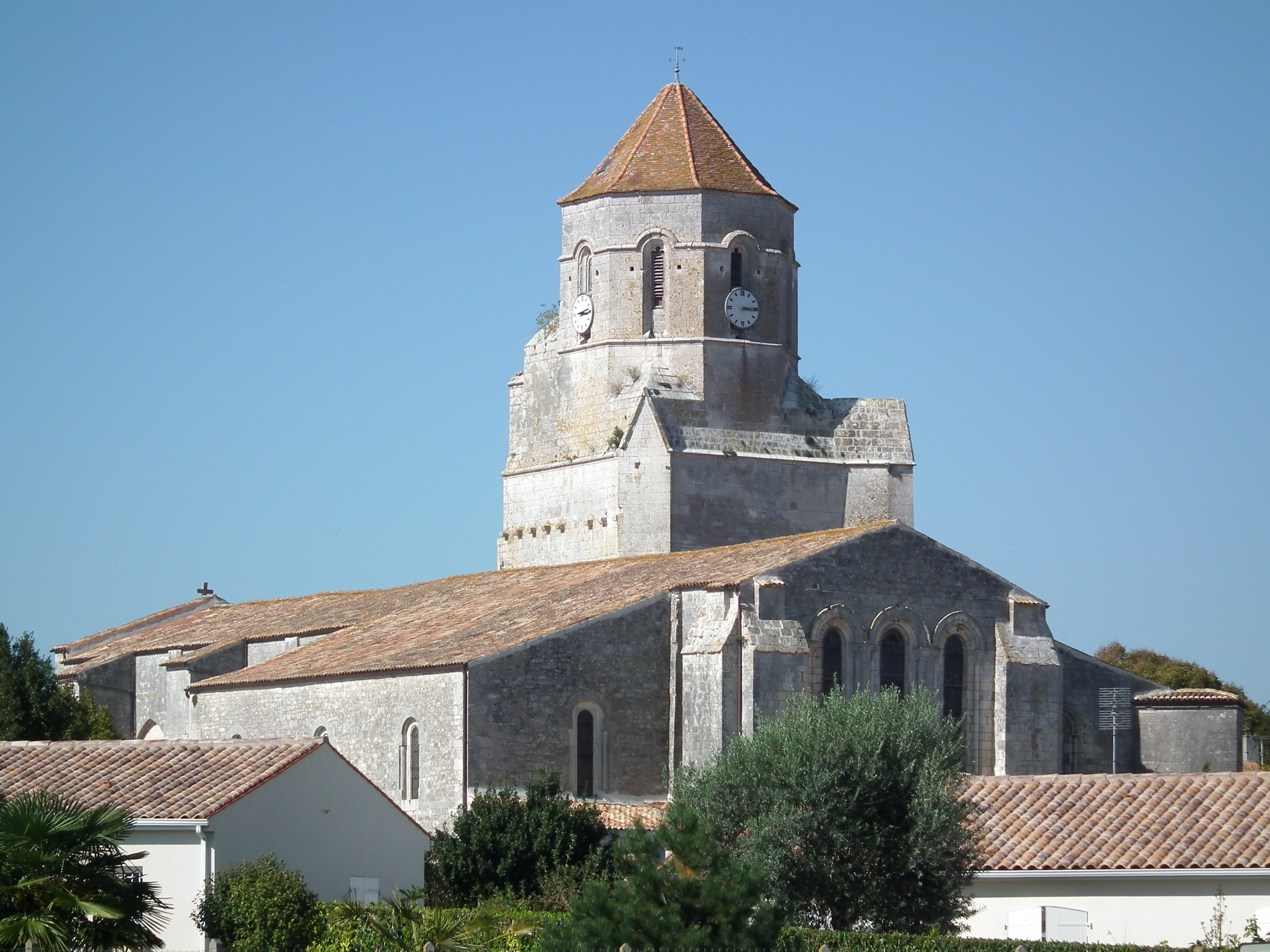
- Church

- Coat of arms
- Location of Cozes
- Location within France Location within Nouvelle-Aquitaine
- Coordinates: 45°35′02″N 0°49′49″W
- Country: France
- Region: Nouvelle-Aquitaine
- Department: Charente-Maritime
- Arrondissement: Saintes
- Canton: Saintonge Estuaire
- Intercommunality: CA Royan Atlantique

Government
  - Mayor (2020–2026): Graziella Bordage
- Area^{1}: 16.56 km^{2} (6.39 sq mi)
- Highest elevation: 59 m (194 ft)
- Lowest elevation: 10 m (33 ft)
- Population (2023): 2,287
  - Density: 138.1/km^{2} (357.7/sq mi)
- Time zone: UTC+01:00 (CET)
  - Summer (DST): UTC+02:00 (CEST)
- INSEE/Postal code: 17131 /17120
- ^{1} French Land Register data, which excludes lakes, ponds, glaciers > 1 km^{2} (0.386 sq mi or 247 acres) and river estuaries.

Cozes (French pronunciation: [kɔz]) is a commune in the Charente-Maritime department in southwestern France in the region of Nouvelle-Aquitaine. Its inhabitants are Cozillions . The town of Cozes forms part of the urban community Royan, which, as of 2006, had a total population of 72,136 inhabitants.

It is part of the rural hinterland of Royan and is a hub of commercial activities and crafts.

The small town, is grouped around a church dating back to 12th and 13th centuries. Its perfectly preserved market place attracts increasing numbers of tourists, who are brought into the area by its proximity to the resorts on the Coast of Beauty (La Côte de Beauté). It annually hosts various cultural events including the 'Southern Exposure' festival, dedicated to the cultures of Africa.

== Population ==
Historical population

Year	Pop.	±% p.a.
1793	1,882	—
1800	1,886	+0.03%
1806	1,706	−1.66%
1821	1,796	+0.34%
1831	1,871	+0.41%
1836	1,948	+0.81%
1841	1,906	−0.43%
1846	1,914	+0.08%
1851	1,890	−0.25%
1856	1,889	−0.01%
1861	1,885	−0.04%
1866	1,898	+0.14%
1872	1,828	−0.62%
1876	1,850	+0.30%
1881	1,837	−0.14%
1886	1,758	−0.88%
1891	1,688	−0.81%
1896	1,600	−1.07%
1901	1,553	−0.59%

Year	Pop.	±% p.a.
1906	1,552	−0.01%
1911	1,446	−1.40%
1921	1,379	−0.47%
1926	1,370	−0.13%
1931	1,433	+0.90%
1936	1,441	+0.11%
1946	1,331	−0.79%
1954	1,446	+1.04%
1962	1,579	+1.11%
1968	1,653	+0.77%
1975	1,697	+0.38%
1982	1,746	+0.41%
1990	1,730	−0.12%
1999	1,830	+0.63%
2007	1,925	+0.63%
2012	2,041	+1.18%
2017	2,142	+0.97%
2023	2,287	+1.10%

Source: EHESS and INSEE (1968-2023)

== See also ==
- Communes of the Charente-Maritime department
