= Saint-Augustin, Charente-Maritime =

Saint-Augustin
- Commune
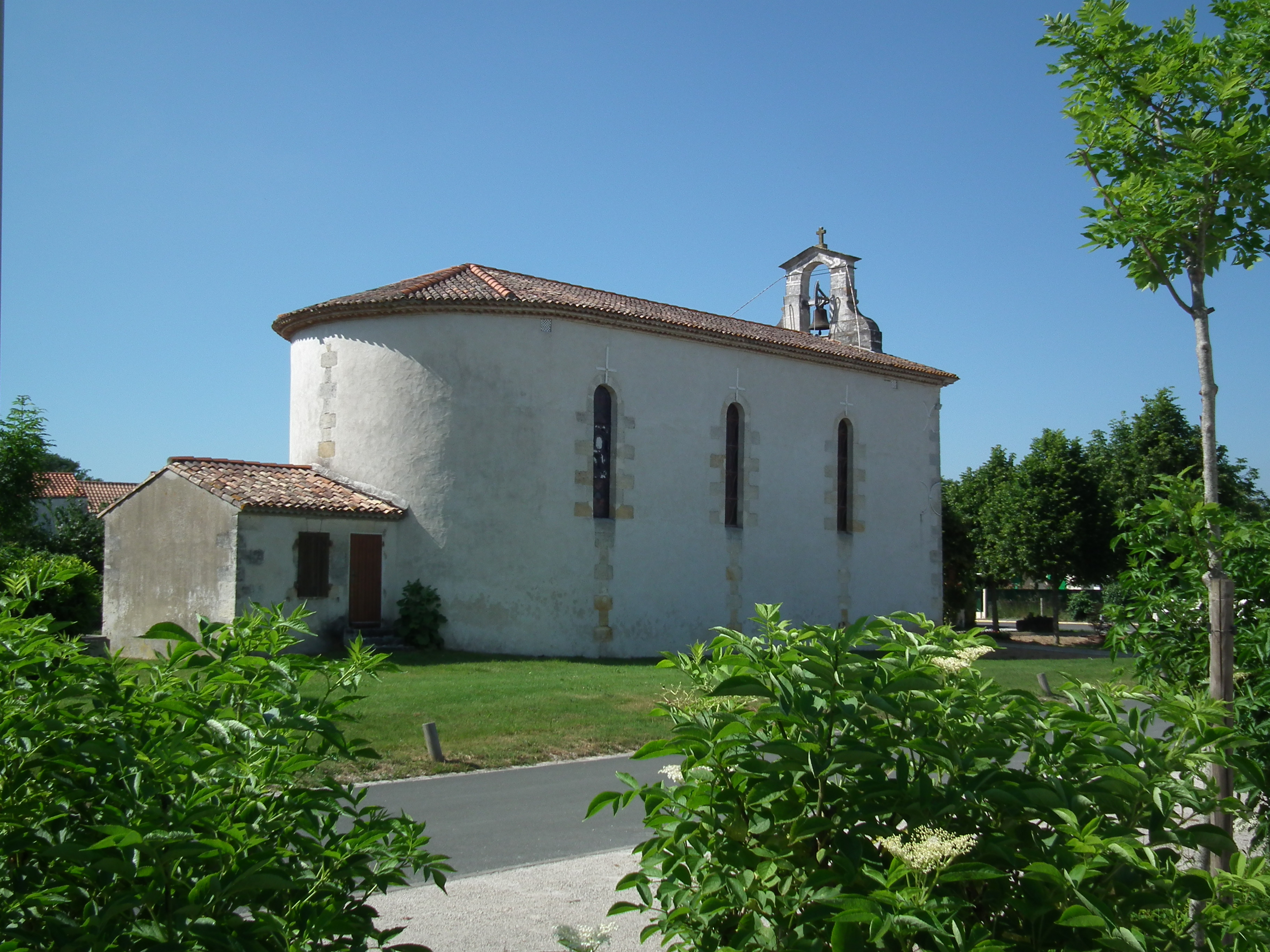
- The church in Saint-Augustin
- Location of Saint-Augustin
- Location within France Location within Nouvelle-Aquitaine
- Coordinates: 45°40′44″N 1°05′53″W
- Country: France
- Region: Nouvelle-Aquitaine
- Department: Charente-Maritime
- Arrondissement: Rochefort
- Canton: La Tremblade
- Intercommunality: CA Royan Atlantique

Government
  - Mayor (2020–2026): Gwennaëlle Dohin-Prost
- Area^{1}: 18.83 km^{2} (7.27 sq mi)
- Elevation: 10 m (33 ft)
- Highest elevation: 45 m (148 ft)
- Lowest elevation: 0 m (0 ft)
- Population (2023): 1,521
  - Density: 80.78/km^{2} (209.2/sq mi)
- Time zone: UTC+01:00 (CET)
  - Summer (DST): UTC+02:00 (CEST)
- INSEE/Postal code: 17311 /17570
- ^{1} French Land Register data, which excludes lakes, ponds, glaciers > 1 km^{2} (0.386 sq mi or 247 acres) and river estuaries.

Saint-Augustin (French pronunciation: [sɛ̃.t‿oɡystɛ̃]) is a commune in the Charente-Maritime department in southwestern France.

== Population ==
Historical population
Year	Pop.	±% p.a.
1968	493	—
1975	539	+1.28%
1982	634	+2.35%
1990	742	+1.99%
1999	851	+1.53%
2007	1,166	+4.02%
2012	1,297	+2.15%
2017	1,351	+0.82%
2023	1,521	+2.00%
Source: INSEE

== See also ==
- Communes of the Charente-Maritime department
