= Flagman =

Flagman may refer to:

- Flagman (rail), an employee of the railroad who is assigned to protect anyone performing work on a railroad right-of-way
- Flagman, a Nintendo Game & Watch game
- Flagman, a Russian Navy counterpart to a flag officer
- Traffic guard, person who sets up warning signs and barricades to slow down the speed of traffic
- Flagman, a person who walked in front of early automobiles carrying a red flag per the Locomotive Acts
