= Tramways de Royan =

Coordinates: 45.65151°N 1.12264°W

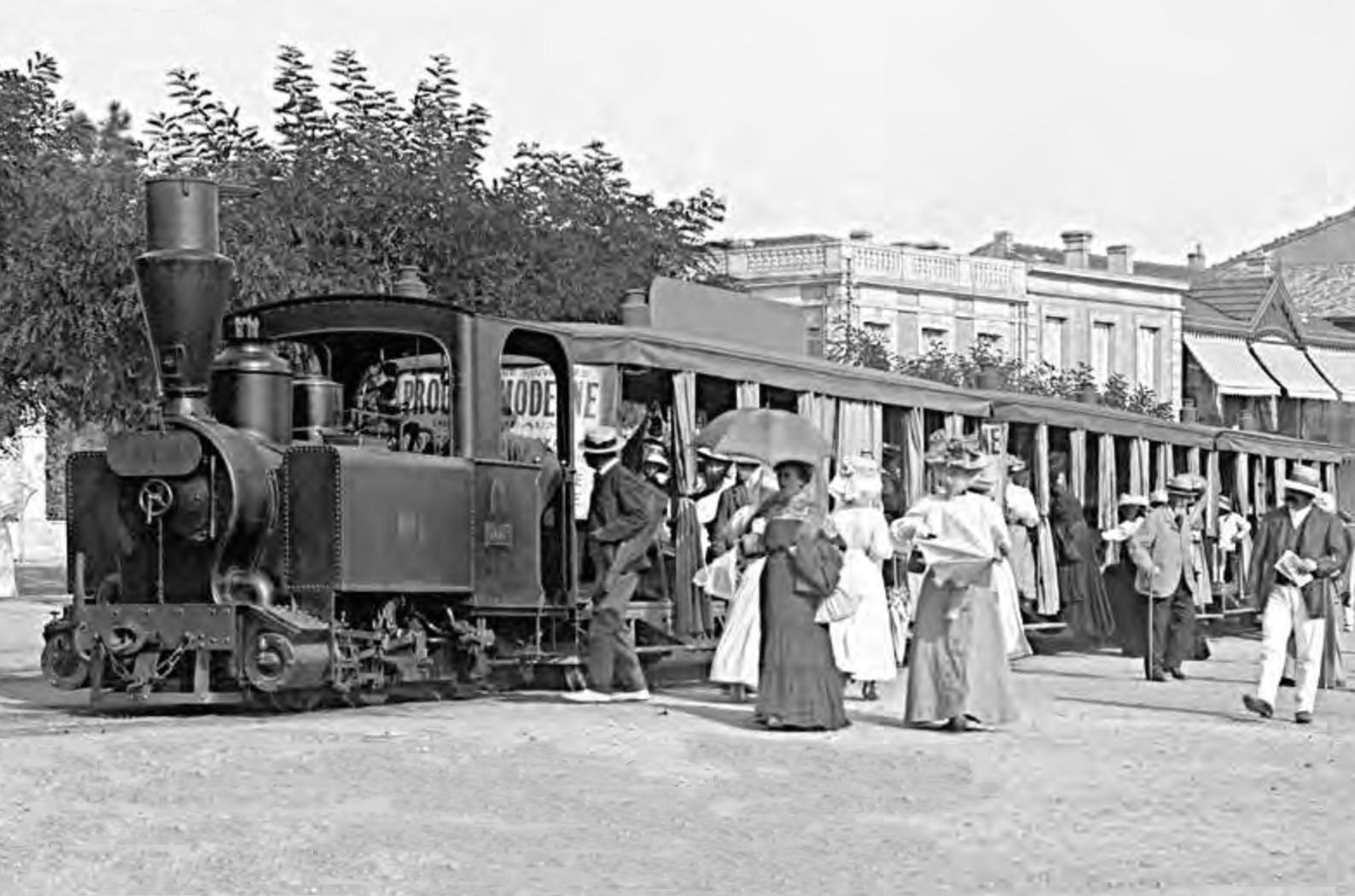

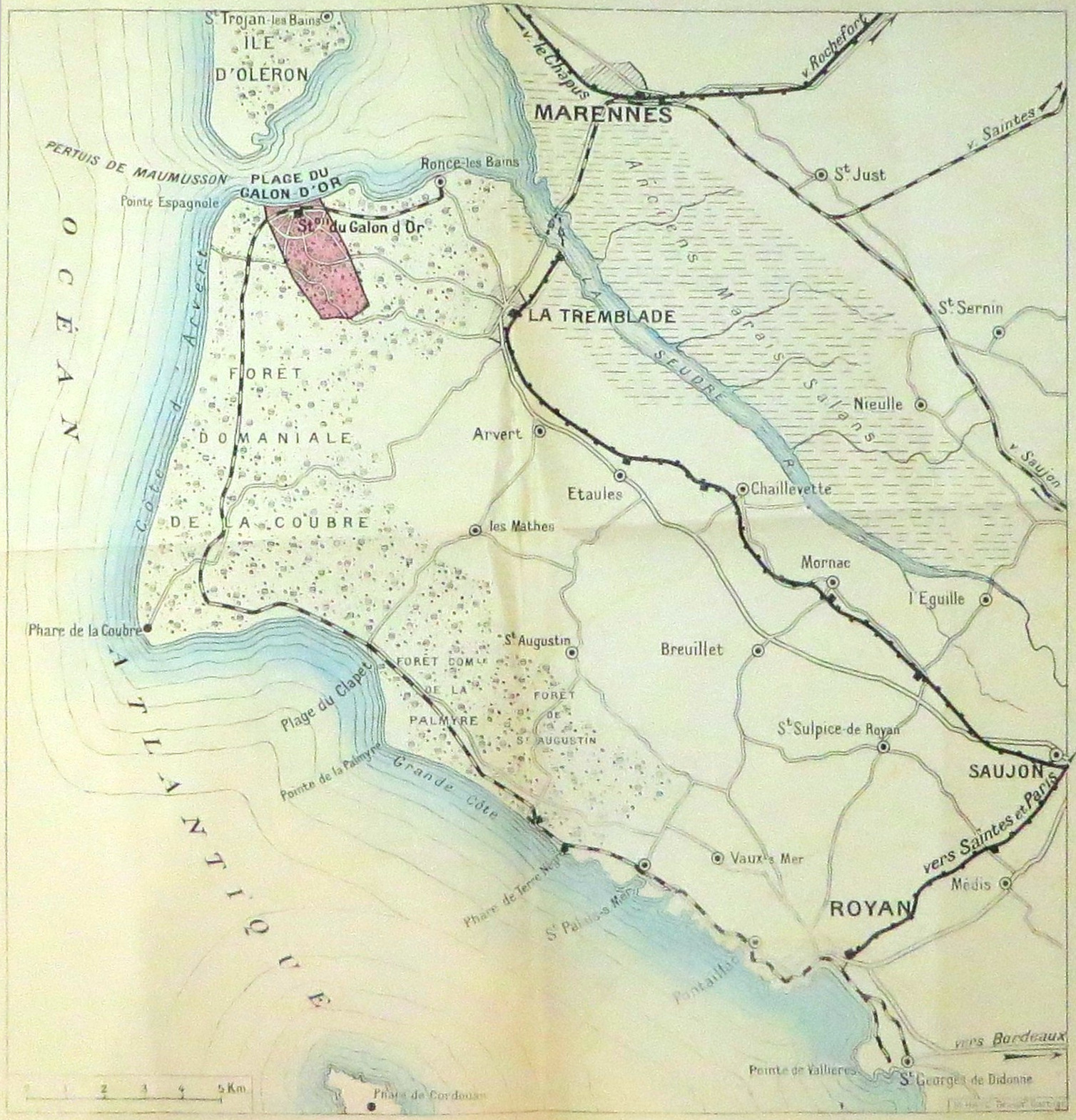
- Route on an old map

Technical
- Line length: 41 km (25 mi)
- Track gauge: 600 mm (1 ft 11 5/8 in)
- Operating speed: Residential: 10 km/h (6.2 mph); Rural: 20 km/h (12 mph)

The Tramways de Royan (French pronunciation: [tʁamwɛ də ʁwajɑ̃]) were two narrow-gauge railways that provided mainly passenger transport in and around the coastal resort town of Royan in western France.

== History ==
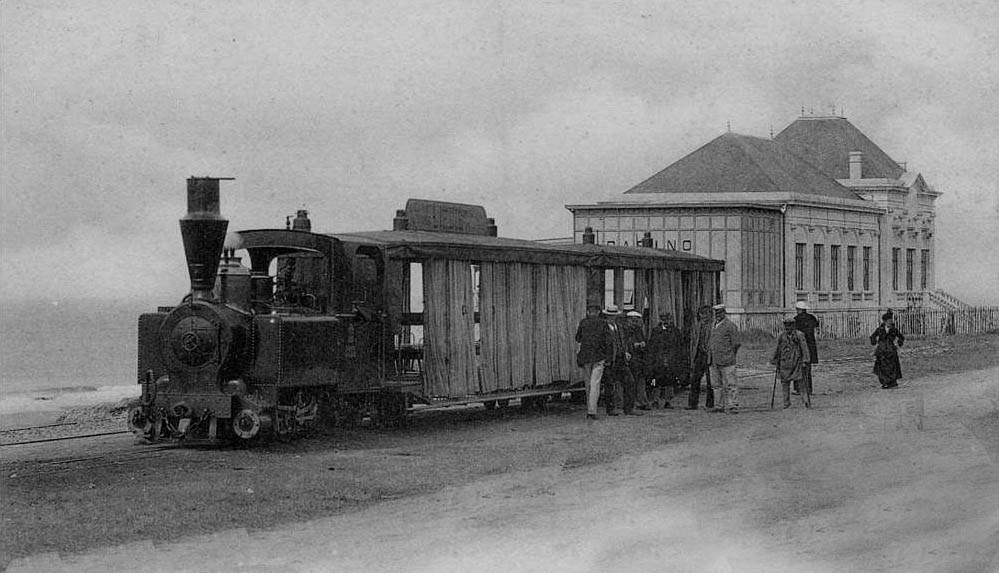
Steam tramway, ready to depart from Grande-Côte, 1904

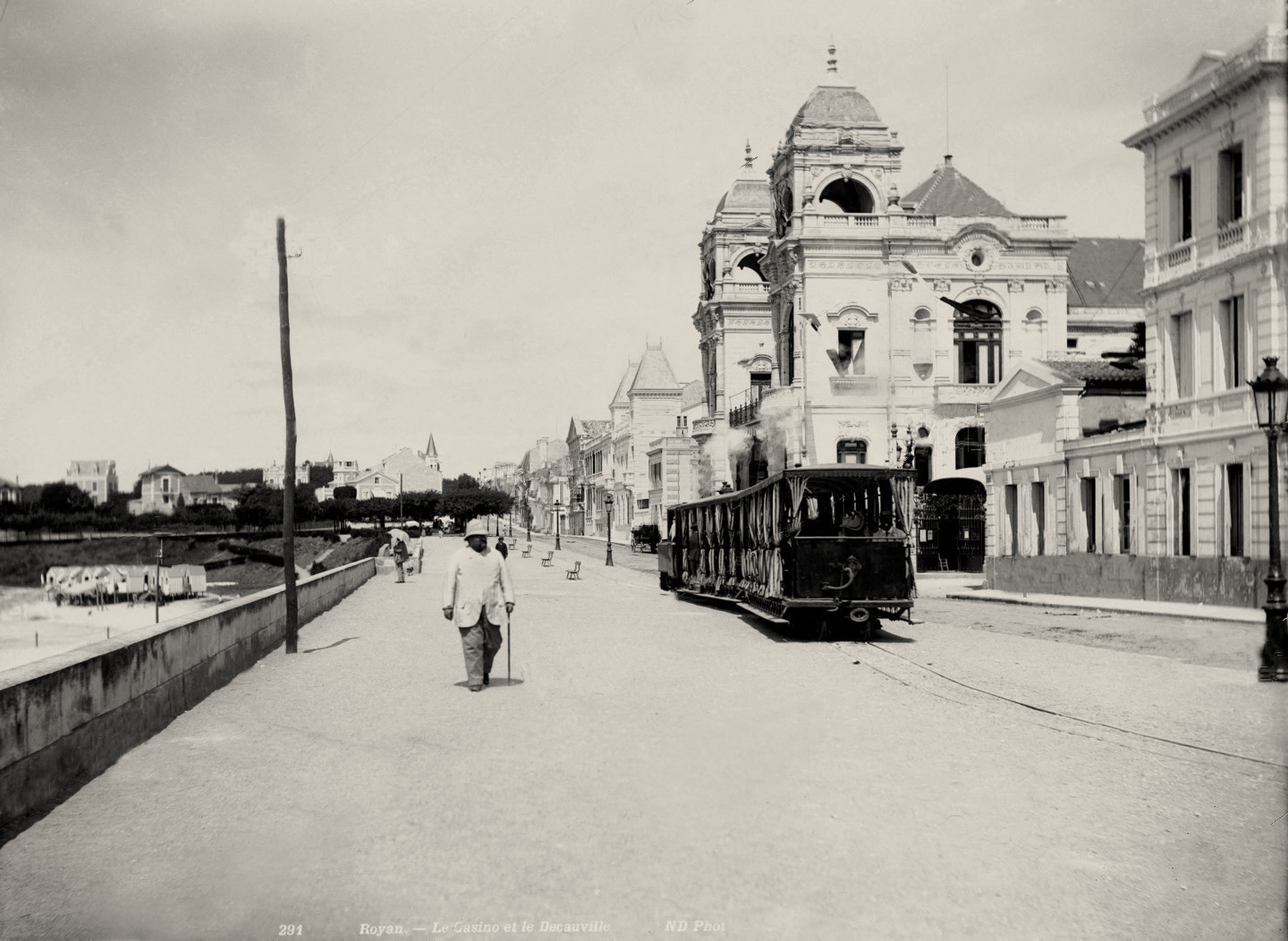
A steam train at the Casino de Foncillon

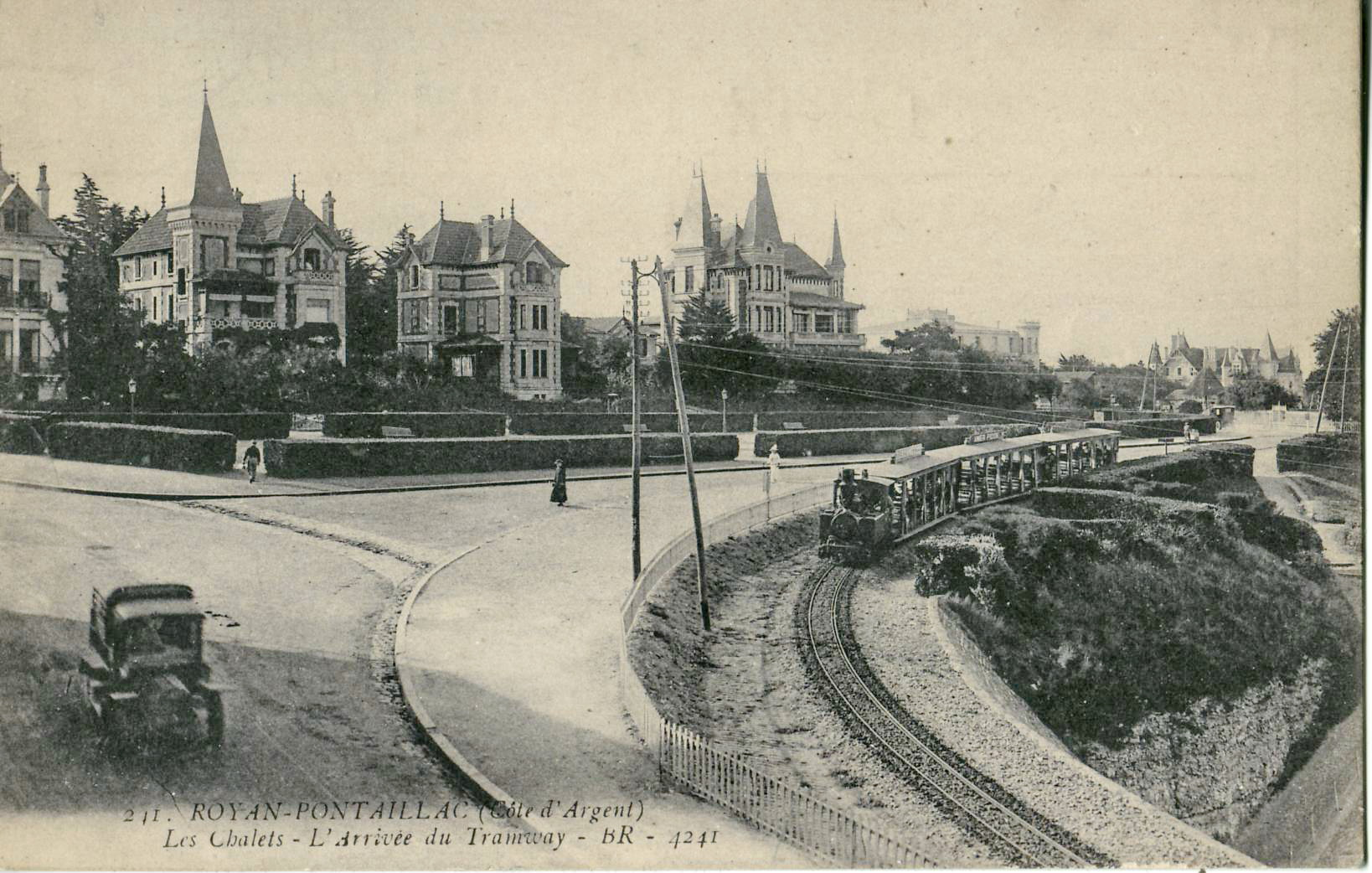
Steam tramway in the sea-side resort of Pontaillac

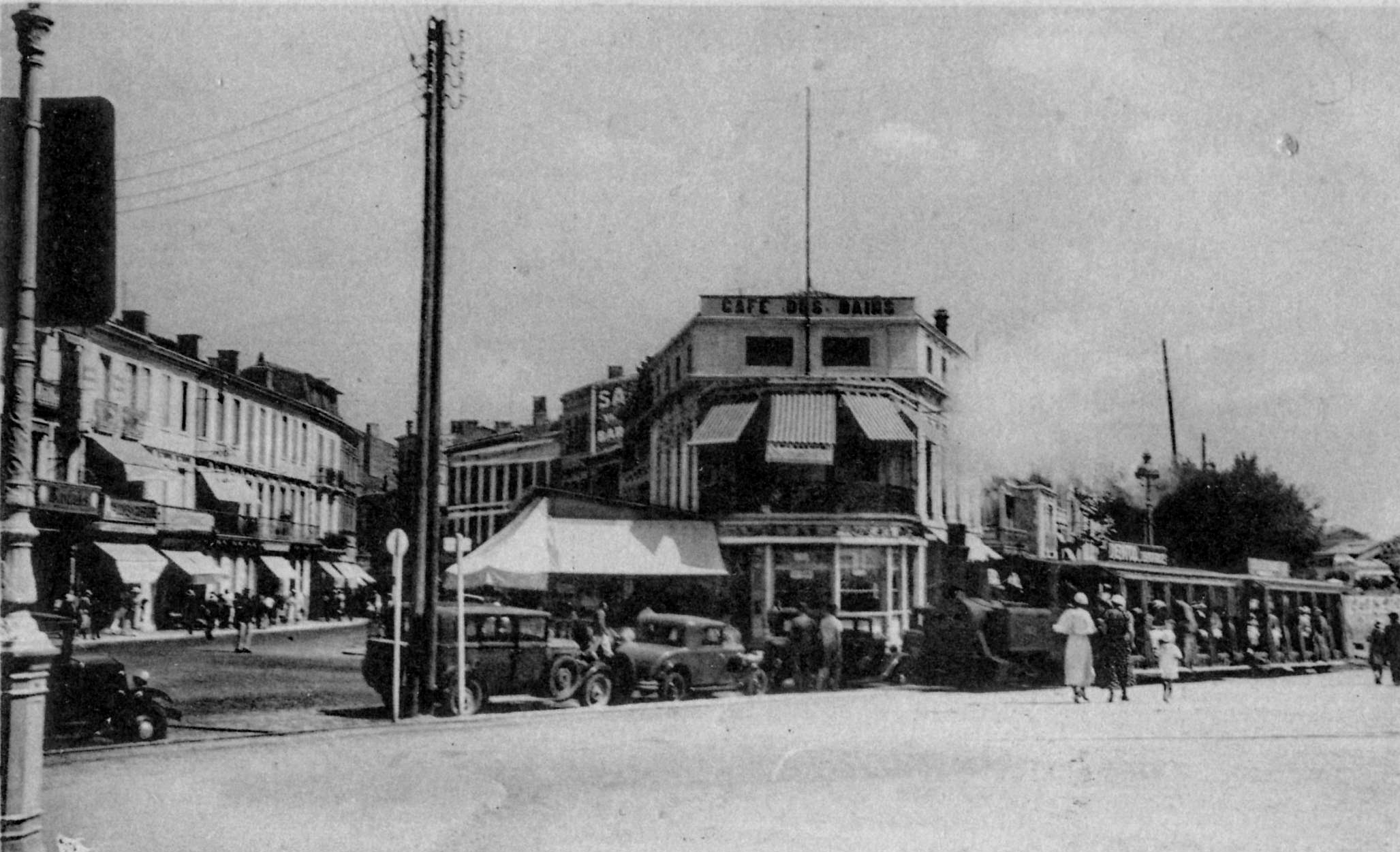
Steam tramway at Café des Bains in Royan, 1930s

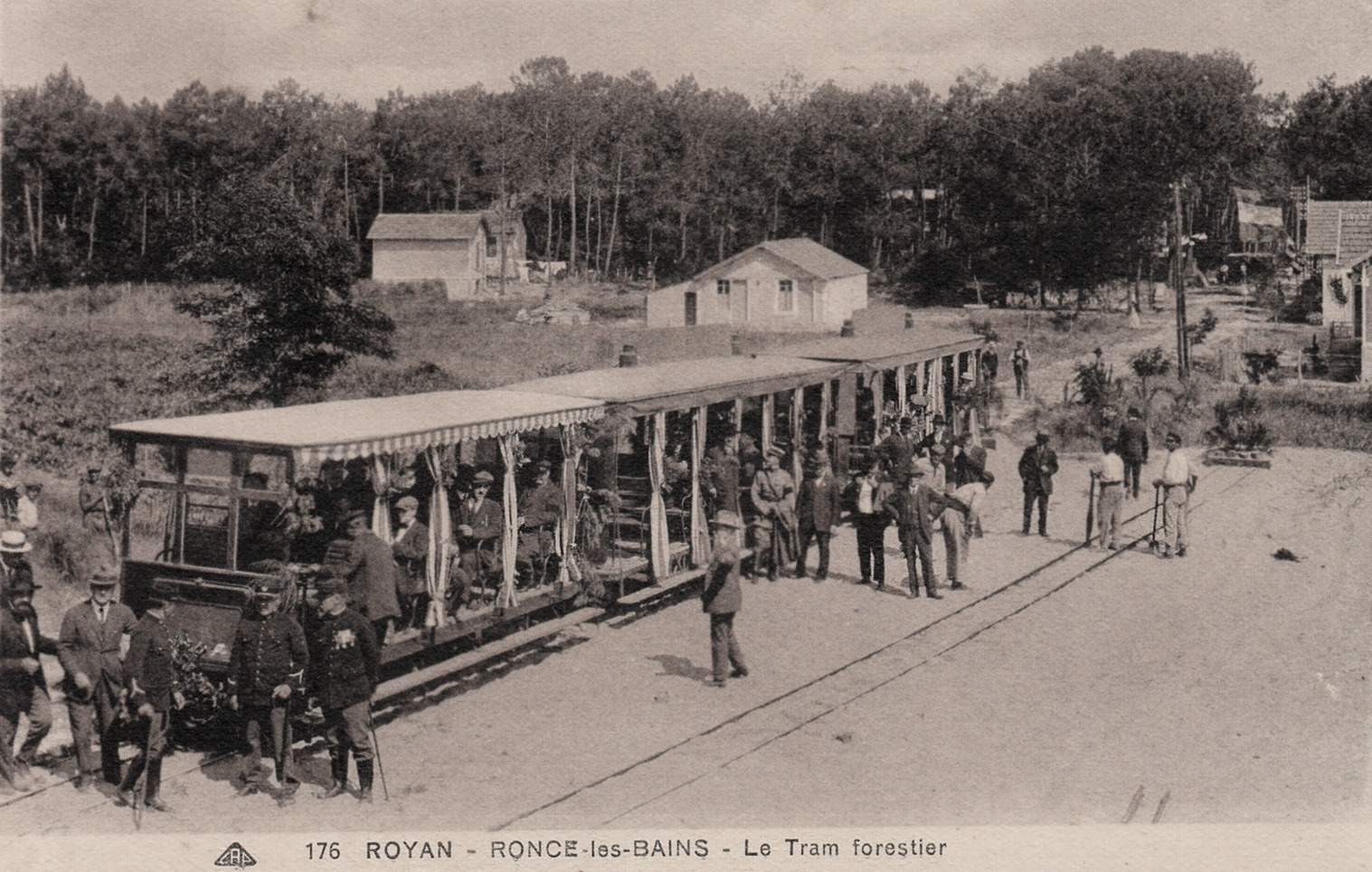
Inauguration of a Campagne petrol railcar (Automotrice) by Gaston Nougarède, director of the SGTR on the left in front of the railcar with black cap. View of the inaugural train departing from Ronce-les-Bains for the return journey of the guests, 1924.

In Royan, the Société Générale de Tramway de Royan (SGTR), a subsidiary of the Société Centrale des Chemins de fer et des Tramways, had a 600 mm (1 ft 11 5/8 in) gauge steam tramway built by the Decauville company on behalf of the town and operated it until 1894. Trains ran on the first sections in the urban area from 1890, but the branch to the railway station was only used until 1893. At the start of the 1891 bathing season, the railway extended to the north-west as far as the suburb of Pontaillac and to the south-east as far as Saint-Georges-de-Didonne. In the summer season, the trains, which were mainly used by the many tourists, ran every half hour.

Initially, 0-4-4-0 Mallet tank locomotives built in 1889 with and an unladen weight of 9.5 t were used, which had run on the Decauville railway at Exposition Universelle of 1889, for which the Eiffel Tower had been built. They were named Kairouan, Australie and Madagascar and were later passed on to the Chemins de fer du Calvados in 1892.

The Compagnie du Tramway de La Grande-Côte à Royan was granted a concession for the 6 km (3.7 mi) long extension to the coastal area of La Grande-Côte in the municipality of Saint-Palais-sur-Mer, which opened in 1897. From the outset, the SGTR managed the operation here and also became the owner from 1903. In 1905, the network had reached a length of 17 km (11 mi) with the La Grande-Côte-Saint Palais-Royan-Didonne line, which mainly ran along the coast, with the new branch from Royan-Paradou to the port of Saint-Georges-de-Didonne.

The 27 km (17 mi) long forest tram of the Tramway de Grande-Côte à Ronce-les-Bains (GCR) company along the Côte Sauvage (Wild Coast) began at La Grande-Côte station. It was opened in 1892 by the forestry commission as a metre-gauge (3 ft 3 3/8 in) gauge horse-drawn tram line and was converted to 600 mm (1 ft 11 5/8 in) gauge in 1913. In 1925, the SGTR took over operation, so that its network then covered a total of 42 km (26 mi).

In 1933, the Département Charente-Maritime took over from the town of Royan. Instead of forest railway trains, the line from La Grande-Côte was served by buses from 1939. The entire operation, which suffered severe damage during the Second World War, was finally closed to passenger traffic in 1945 and to freight traffic in 1947/48.

== Locomotives ==
Normally, the trains of the Royan steam tramway consisted of a 0-4-2 locomotive (with two coupled axles and one trailing axle) and three open carriages. The more powerful 0-6-2 locomotives could also pull four carriages. Trains with four carriages were a rarity, as there were only two or three of these locomotives. According to the numerous reports from people familiar with the Royan tramway, one of the more powerful locomotives was normally stationed in Pontaillac on peak days as a reserve and possible reinforcement.

The first metre-gauge Decauville railcars (Automotrice) were procured around 1903. From 1924, six petrol-powered Campagne railcars from the 1910s were used on the 600 mm forest railway lines, both of which ran on the Groupe Laborie narrow-gauge lines in 1914 after the outbreak of the First World War and were finally used as light railcars on the metre-gauge lines from Cormeilles to Glos and Montfort-sur-Risle in the Eure department around 1933. (Note: The first batch of Campagne railcars had 24 seats, while the second batch only had 20 seats, albeit with upholstered seats. The sidecars were classic Decauville steam tramcars (Baladeuse, type "KE") with 56 seats (including 48 seats), in their original condition with minor adaptations. There were also short sidecars that the SGTR workshops had built themselves on the chassis of an old closed Decavuville carriage (type "IS"). The railcar pulling the inaugural train of the 600 mm forest railway had been re-gauged from metre gauge to 600 mm gauge in order to operate the re-gauged forest railway lines as an extension of the steam tramways.)

== Operation ==
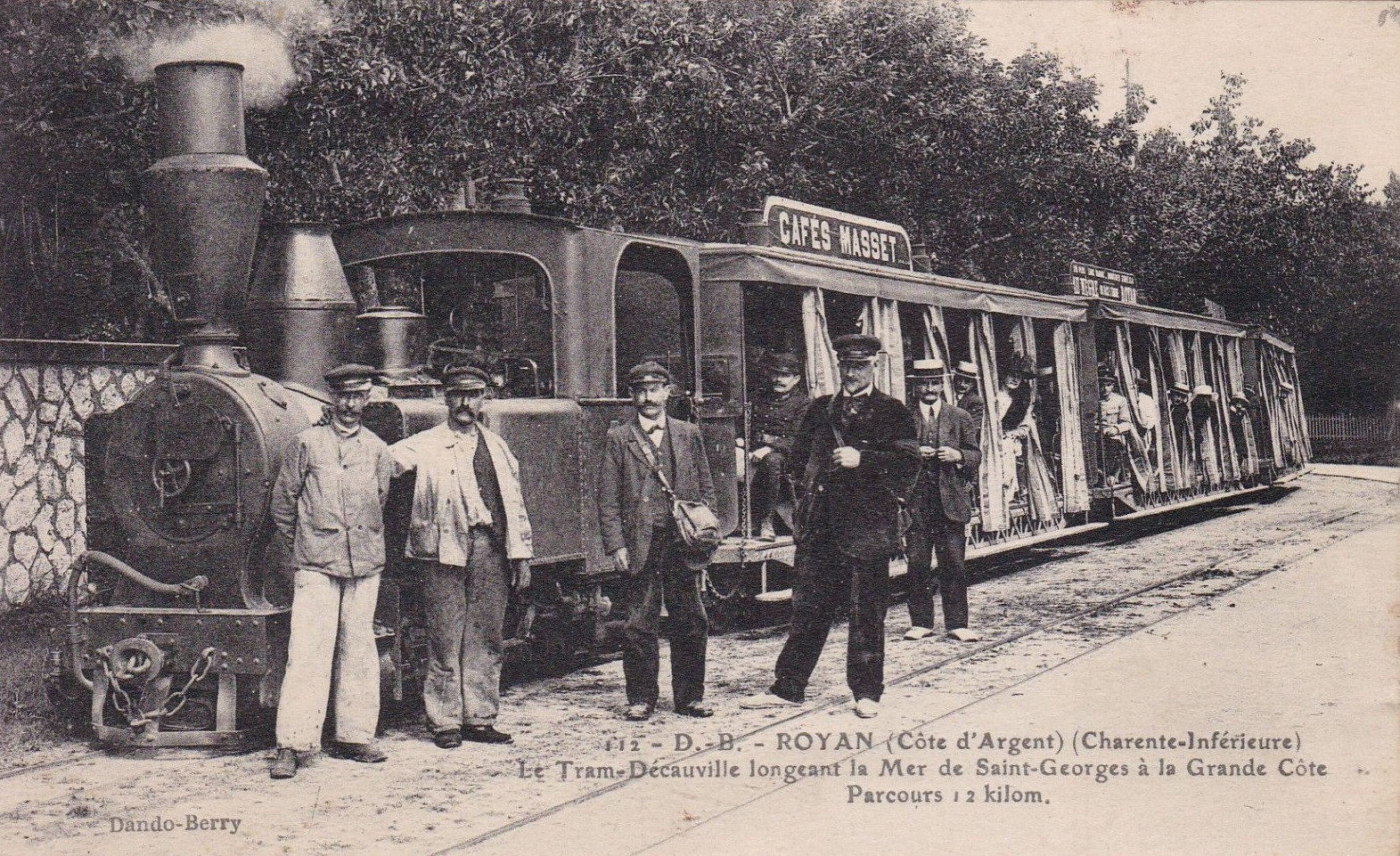
Driver, mechanic, conductor and chief controller of a steam train at Le Chay

Several water supply points were accessible along the line, at which the water tanks attached to the sides of the steam locomotives could be filled: Water towers with a water crane were each at the Bureau de Saint-Palais and Casino stations on the Place des Acacias, while only a simple hose was used for this purpose at Pontaillac and Grande Côte.

In the first season, there were fifty trains a day, departing every 15 minutes. By 1 October 1890, 160,000 passengers had been transported and in the following year, traffic even doubled to 357,000 passengers.

== Proposal to re-install the forest tramway ==
In 2020, the association Les Sept Sentinelles (The Seven Guardians) gave serious thought to re-installing the forest tramway and putting it back into operation. It proposed building a 12 to 13-kilometre line along the Vélodyssée route with three stations and six on-demand stops: Pointe-Espagnole - Les Clônes - Négrevaux - Passe Blanche - La Bouverie - Phare de Coubre - Bonne Anse - La Palmyre.

== Stations of the forest tramway and steam tramway ==
From north to south, there were the following stations with a water supply, double-track stops and single-track stops on demand (as well as other landmarks listed in brackets):

Stations of the forest tramway (Tram forestier) steam tramway (Le tramway Decauville)
Photo	Station	Comment	More photos
Stations of the forest tram line
	Ronce-les-Bains	Ronce-les-Bains was the northern terminus of the forest railway. From there it was possible to take a boat to the Île d'Oléron.	More photos
	To La Tremblade	The Tramway forestier (normally spelt with a capital 'T' and a small 'f') was extended to the road from Ronce-les-Bains to Tremblade by 1913 at the latest. From 1923, it led to the southern outskirts of Ronce-les-Bains. The Organisation Todt extended the line with a military light railway on the road to La Tremblade during the World War II. (Note: The forest tramway and its planned extension to La Tremblade on an Sea Chart of 1896 Surprisingly, a British Admiralty Chart of July 1896 shows already a branch line to La Tremblade and beyond.)	
	Le Galon d'Or	The forest tramway station Galon d'Or was located on the beach at a long, wooden jetty from which boats could be loaded with wood that was felled in the forest of La Coubre and transported to the jetty by forest railway.	More photoss
	La Pointe Espagnole	Approximately 1.2 km (0.75 mi) north of the forestry house Maison Forestière des Clones, a branch line merged the main line from the east. It served the forest area la Pointe Espagnole not far from the beach. (Note: The Maison Forestière de la Pointe Espagnole was, according to contradictory information, probably either identical with the Maison Forestière Roître des Bassets or with the Maison Forestière les Roseaux. In total, there were the following twelve forester's lodges to the right and left of the forest railway from north to south: 1. La Palmyre, 2. Bonne-Anse, 3. Le Requin (demolished), 4. La Grande Courbe (washed away by the sea), 5. La Bouverie, 6. Le Pavillon, 7. Les Brisquettes 8. Roître des Bassets (washed away by the sea), 9. La Passe Blanche, 10. Nègrevaux, 11. Les Clones, 12. Les Roseaux (demolished).)	More photos
	La Bouverie	For the construction of the forest railway and the reforestation of "La Coubre", 48 oxen were used, which were housed in the "Bouverie" (oxen stable), whose name is still preserved today in the "Maison Forestière de la Bouverie" and the "Tranchée de la Bouverie". The Bouverie buildings were owned by the water and forestry authorities.	More photos
	La Coubre	The reforestation of La Coubre began in 1867. The sand was first to be fixed by marram grass and then pines were to be planted where the sand layer was very thick, and aspens, alders or poplars in the old marshes that had just silted up. Initially, the work was carried out on private or communal initiative and only subsidised by the state. However, as the reforestation did not progress quickly, the Water and Forestry Administration took over the project in 1862 and laid a metre-gauge forest railway to carry out the work.	More photos
	(Le Clapet)	At the beginning of the 19th century, the Bréjat marsh (marais de Bréjat) was converted into pastureland. A drainage canal was dug, equipped with a sluice gate (Le Clapet) to prevent salt water from entering at high tide, and the beach was named "Plage du Clapet". From 1824, the dunes were planted with maritime pines. The marsh of Bréjat was eventually flooded by the sea and a sandbank formed at the Pointe de la Coubre, creating the bay of Bonne Anse, which closed, silted up and silted up by the currents.	More photos
	(Phare de Bonne Anse)	The forest restaurants at the lighthouse of La Coubre, also known as the Phare de Bonne Anse, and on the beach of Mathes to the south were popular excursion destinations in the post-war period, which could be reached by forest railway at moderate prices.	More photos
	La Palmyre	The forestry house Maison Forestière La Palmyre was located in the area of today's seaside resort of La Palmyre near Les Mathes, not far from the main entrance to today's Zoo de la Palmyre.	More photos
	La Combe	The metre-gauge forest railway originally started at the La Combe à Massé quarry in 1868. Initially used mainly by workers and employees for silvicultural work, the forest railway was also used by summer visitors after reforestation was completed. In the newspaper Le Gaulois of 21 July 1884 and 11 August 1884, an advertisement appeared for "visits by forest railway to La Palmyre, La Coubre, the Pavillon Bonne-Anse, the Pointe Espagnole, the Galon d'Or, the forest and dolmens of Combots, the forest of Arvert, etc."	
	Terminus de Tram Forestier	Southern terminus of the forest railway. Passengers could change to the steam tramway here. There were no direct trains (without changing at La Grande Côte) from La Coubre or Ronce-les-Bains to Royan. Although the lines were connected by a switch that was normally padlocked, the tracks were several dozen metres apart. The petrol railcars were too weak on the mountainous routes of the steam tramway and the steam locomotives could not be used in the forest areas due to the risk of forest fires.	More photos
Stations of the steam tram line
	La Grande-Côte	Northern terminus of the steam tramway. Here, passengers could change to the petrol railcars of the Waldbahn.	More photos
	Les Puits de l'Auture	Close to the Terre Nègre lighthouse, there was a stop at the Puits de l'Auture, a landmark in the landscape. It was a natural bridge over a washout in the cliffs where the waves broke.	More photos
	Concié	A single-track railway stop above the deeply incised bay of Le Concié.	
	Puyraveau	To the east of Terre Nègre stood the villa Tutta-Mia directly beside the track of the steam tramway.	More photos
	Saint-Palais	The most important station Le Bureau with diverter track, water tower, siding and pastry shop on the beach of Bureau (Plage du Bureau). The name comes from two offices that were set up there to combat smuggling: an agricultural office (Bureau des Fermes) was set up there in 1729, which was replaced by the customs office (Bureau des Douanes) in 1840.	More photos
	St-Palais-Plage	Leon Trotsky lived during his exile in the villa Les Embruns (the sea spray), a solitary house in the middle of a large garden overlooking a cliff and close to the beach, whose name, where the sea was churning, was well justified. When he first arrived there on 25 July 1933, a fire caused by sparks from a steam locomotive had set fire to the nearby bushes, delaying his arrival and worrying those who came.	
	Tré la Chasse		
	Vaux-Nauzan	The 250 metre long Promenade Forestière de Trez-la-Chasse is one of the few places that have remained as they were at the time of the tramway. Between Nauzan (also Nausan or Nauzant) near Vaux-sur-Mer and Pontaillac, the line was laid on its own track. The gradient was 40 ‰ over a length of around 250 metres.	More photos
	Les Fées	Die Halte stelle wurde auch Deffé genannt	
	Les Ajoncs		
	Malakoff		
	Pontaillac	Pontaillac was the northern terminus of the steam tramway from 1890 to 1897. The station had three tracks, which were accessible via a three-way railroad switch. A wagon with coke sacks could be parked on a siding.	More photos
	La Falaise		
	Le Pigeonnier		
	Le Chay	At Chay station there was a double-track passing loop but probably no shelter for passengers. The railway ran through an extensive residential area.	More photos
	Le Fort		
	Les Tennis	The request stop was close to the courts of the Royan Garden Tennis club. The Royan Tournament, however, took place in 1908 on Pontaillac beach at low tide, very close to the steam tramway that can be seen in the background at the top left corner of the picture.	
	Foncillon		
	Le Port	The jetty built in 1898 gave passengers travelling by steamship to or from Bordeaux the opportunity to transfer to the steam tramway at the "Port" station on Boulevard Thiers.	More photos
	(Le Café des Bains)	The Café des Bains was located at the upper end of La Rampe Lessore. Pablo Picasso captured it in a colourful painting, albeit without the steam tram.	
	(La Rampe Lessore)	At the upper end was the Café des Bains, from where the ramp led down to Boulevard Lessore. Many publications mention a maximum gradient of 40 ‰.	More photos
	Croix-Blanche	Croix-Blanche (White Cross) was a stop at the points of a turning loop in the city centre. From the turning loop there were branches to the Dépôt and to the station forecourt of the standard-gauge state railway.	
	Dépôt	Initially, the address was given as "Depot de la Rue de l'Ecluse", although on the 1888 plan it is about 50 metres away (today Rue Colonel Desplats), as Rue des Combes de Mons did not yet exist at the time the specifications were drawn up in 1894.	
	Boulevard Botton	The boulevard is named after Augustin Botton (* 1818 in Marennes, † 30 April 1882 in Royan), a civil engineer from the road and bridge construction department who was the first to propose a beautification plan for the coastal town after the casino was built in 1847. He was responsible for the structural improvement of the town and harbour of Royan, the construction of the Pontaillac lighthouse and the planting of the dry sand dunes in Pontaillac and Le Parc. He presented his urban development plan on 21 August 1847, describing a new town with a garden, which later became the Cours Botton.	
	Gare de Royan	The standard-gauge railway to Saintes began at Royan station.	
	Casino Municipal (Note: From 1890 to 1894: Champ de Foire, since 1894: Royan-Casino, since 1928: Casino Municipal)	At the station in front of the Casino Municipal on the Place des Acacias, there was a water tower where the steam locomotives could collect water and one and a siding for the SGTR's only covered goods wagon, in which coke was transported from the gas works to the Place des Acacias to heat the locomotives. The locomotives required around 10 kg of coke and 50 litres of water per kilometre.	More photos
	Rue de l'Etat		
	Le Grand Hôtel	The double-track Grand Hôtel stop was opposite the hotel of the same name on Boulevard Saint-Georges. The similarly named Grand-Hotel de Paris was also on the tram line, but did not have a stop named after it.	More photos
Stations on the south-western steam tram line
	Le Paradou	The station Paradou was named after the villa of the publisher of Emile Zola, whose garden gate can be seen on the right of the photo. When the new line was built in 1890, the line that had previously run in a curve to St. Georges de Didonne (Ville) was extended in a straight line to St. Georges de Didonne (Port) at the harbour near Le Paradou.	More photos
	Parc Façade	The station Parc Façade had a wooden shelter Boulevard de Saint-Georges (now Boulevard Frédéric Garnier)	
	Vallières	Near the holiday resort Oceanic Parc, which was occupied by German forces in 1941 and subsequently blown up.	
	Plume la Poule	At the Plume la Poule stop in the vineyards of La Crête de Vallières, the line had to overcome a height difference of 18 metres.	
	Saint-Georges (Port)	The line to Saint-George (Port) was only put into operation in 1906 as a branch from the south-eastern steam tramway line, which had been in operation since 1890/1891.	More photos
Stations on the south-eastern steam tram line
	Switch at branch from LeParadou to LeParc.	The road to St Georges de Didonne (Ville) turns off the coastal road into the park at "Le Paradu" with a small radius.	
	Le Parc, später Parc-Oasis	In the first half of the 19th century, the town council decided to fortify an area of dunes that had previously not been used for agriculture or forestry by planting trees in a park-like manner. With the growth of the population and the development of seaside tourism, the forests were gradually parcelled out from 1885 onwards. The Le Parc stop was renamed Parc-Oasis when the new railway line to Saint-Georges (Port) was opened.	More photos
	(Riveau de Belmont)	A small bridge over the Belmont drainage canal (French: Le Riveau, Riveau de Boube, Riveau de Vallières or encore Canal de Boube-Belmont).	
	Parc de Sports		
	Le Coca		
	Saint-Georges (Ville)	The line to Saint-George (Ville or Bourg) was put into operation in 1890/1891.	More photos

== List of Locomotives ==
Steam and internal combustion locomotives
Photo	No Quantity	Name	Type	Manufacturer Seller	Works No	Built in	Commissioned at Royan	Previous owner	Decommissioned at Royan	Subsequent owner
		Ma Camarade	B n2t	Couillet	903	1887	1890	Decauville railway at Exposition Universelle, 1889		De Malzine, Carrieres de Rogeries, Nord (new name: Marc Seguin)
		Ma Camarade	B n2t	Decauville	56	1887	1890	Decauville railway at Exposition Universelle, 1889		De Malzine, Carrieres de Rogeries, Nord (new name: Marc Seguin)
		Ville de Laon	B’B n4vt Mallet	Tubize	713	1888	1890	Decauville railway at Exposition Universelle, 1889	1896	Via the Decauville sales representative Ayulo & C^{ie} to the sugar plantation Pardo in Peru (new name: Diego Ferre)
		Ville de Laon	B’B n4vt Mallet	Decauville	59	1889	1890	Decauville railway at Exposition Universelle, 1889	1896	Via the Decauville sales representative Ayulo & C^{ie} to the sugar plantation Pardo in Peru (new name: Diego Ferre)
		Kairouan	B’B n4vt Mallet	Tubize	736	1889	1890	Decauville railway at Exposition Universelle, 1889	1892	Chemins de fer du Calvados (Nr. 6, new name: Varaville), later: Dussus Dompmartin in Nauroy-le-Bavard^{(?)}, later: Turat, Meung-sur-Loire, Loiret
		Kairouan	B’B n4vt Mallet	Decauville	72	1889	1890	Decauville railway at Exposition Universelle, 1889	1892	Chemins de fer du Calvados (Nr. 6, new name: Varaville), later: Dussus Dompmartin in Nauroy-le-Bavard^{(?)}, later: Turat, Meung-sur-Loire, Loiret
		Australie	B’B n4vt Mallet	Tubize	751	1889	1890	Possibly Decauville railway at Exposition Universelle, 1889	um 1892	Chemins de fer du Calvados (Nr. 1, new name: Cabourg), since 1906: C^{ie} Algerienne de Phosphates
		Australie	B’B n4vt Mallet	Decauville	74	1889	1890	Possibly Decauville railway at Exposition Universelle, 1889	um 1892	Chemins de fer du Calvados (Nr. 1, new name: Cabourg), since 1906: C^{ie} Algerienne de Phosphates
		Madagascar	B’B n4vt Mallet	Tubize	752	1889	1890	Possibly Decauville railway at Exposition Universelle, 1889	1892	Chemins de fer du Calvados (Nr. 2, new name: Sallenelles), later: Bourillon & Pelleron
		Madagascar	B’B n4vt Mallet	Decauville	75	1889	1890	Possibly Decauville railway at Exposition Universelle, 1889	1892	Chemins de fer du Calvados (Nr. 2, new name: Sallenelles), later: Bourillon & Pelleron
	1	Royan	B’1 n2t	Weidknecht		1891	1891		approx 1948	Scrapped
	1	Royan	B’1 n2t	Decauville	137	1891	1891		approx 1948	Scrapped
	2	Le Chai	B’1 n2t	Weidknecht		1891	1891		um 1948	Scrapped
	2	Le Chai	B’1 n2t	Decauville	138	1891	1891		um 1948	Scrapped
	3	S^{t} Georges	B’1 n2t	Weidknecht		1891	1891		um 1948	Scrapped
	3	S^{t} Georges	B’1 n2t	Decauville	139	1891	1891		um 1948	Scrapped
	4	Pontaillac	B’1 n2t	Weidknecht		1891	1891		um 1948	Scrapped
	4	Pontaillac	B’1 n2t	Decauville	140	1891	1891		um 1948	Scrapped
	5	S^{t} Palais	B’1 n2t	Weidknecht		1891	1891		um 1948	Scrapped
	5	S^{t} Palais	B’1 n2t	Decauville	141	1891	1891		um 1948	Scrapped
	6	Foncillon	B’1 n2t	Weidknecht		1891	1891		um 1948	Scrapped
	6	Foncillon	B’1 n2t	Decauville	142	1891	1891		um 1948	Scrapped
	7	Vallieres	B’1 n2t	Weidknecht		1891	1891		um 1948	Scrapped
	7	Vallieres	B’1 n2t	Decauville	143	1891	1891		um 1948	Scrapped
	8	Le Parc	B’1 n2t	Weidknecht		1891	1891		um 1948	Scrapped
	8	Le Parc	B’1 n2t	Decauville	144	1891	1891		um 1948	Scrapped
	9	Marie	C’1 n2t	Decauville	235	1896	1896		approx. 1948	Scrapped
	10	Fernande	C’1 n2t	Decauville	234	1896	1896		um 1948	Sold to the Société des Mines de Bormettes in Var departement. Scrapped
	11	Elena	C’1 n2t	Decauville	267	1898	1898		um 1948	Scrapped
	10^{II}	La Coubre	B’1 n2t	Weidknecht		1895	1907		um 1948	Scrapped
	12 (ex 1)	Alsacienne (ex Paramé)	B’1 n2t	Decauville	215	1896	um 1925	Tramway from Paramé to Rothéneuf	um 1948	Scrapped
	13 (ex 2)	Italienne (ex Rothéneuf)	B’1 n2t	Decauville	216	1896	um 1925	Tramway from Paramé to Rothéneuf	um 1948	Scrapped
	2 Pieces	Metre gauge rail car, 8 hp, 24 km/h (15 mph), 24 seated and 6 standing passengers	B	Decauville				1923 re-gauged to 600 mm gauge		
	6 Pieces	600 mm railcar, 40 hp at 1000 rpm, four-speed transmission with reversing gear, 24 leather seats (Note: All Campagne railcars had two driver's cabs, a petrol engine, a transmission with reversing gear, a cone coupling and a chain drive that acted on both axles. A vacuum pump supplied the brakes for the sidecars. The weight was 5 tonnes when empty and 6.5 tonnes in operation and they could pull two tramcars of the Royan tramway (Decauville, type KE with 56 seats). Due to their low power, they could not be used on the Royan tramway, but were taken to the depot for repairs and maintenance during the off-season.)	B	Campagne			um 1923		1952-1954	
			B	Billard			1939–1945	Organisation Todt	um 1948	
	1 Piece	600 mm Benzene locomotive	B	O&K			1939–1945	Organisation Todt		
		OME117 F	B	Deutz	36230	19. Juni 1941	1945	Organisation Todt		Chemin de fer Touristique de la Forêt de Mervent-Vouvant, Hotel de Pierre Brune, Mervent, Vendée.
	2 Pieces	600 mm Benzene locomotive	B	Deutz		1940	1939–1945	Organisation Todt		
	1 Piece	Draisine with Gasoline motor	B	Japy			1939–1945	Organisation Todt		

== Literature ==
- Henri Domengie: Les petits trains de jadis – Band 8: Ouest de la France. Editions du Cabri, Breil-sur-Roya 1990, ISBN 2-903310-87-4
- Federation des Amis des Chemins de Fer Secundaires: Chemins de fer regionaux et urbains. Revue bisemestrielle, N° 139, 1977-I.
