= Saint-Georges-de-Didonne =

- Commune
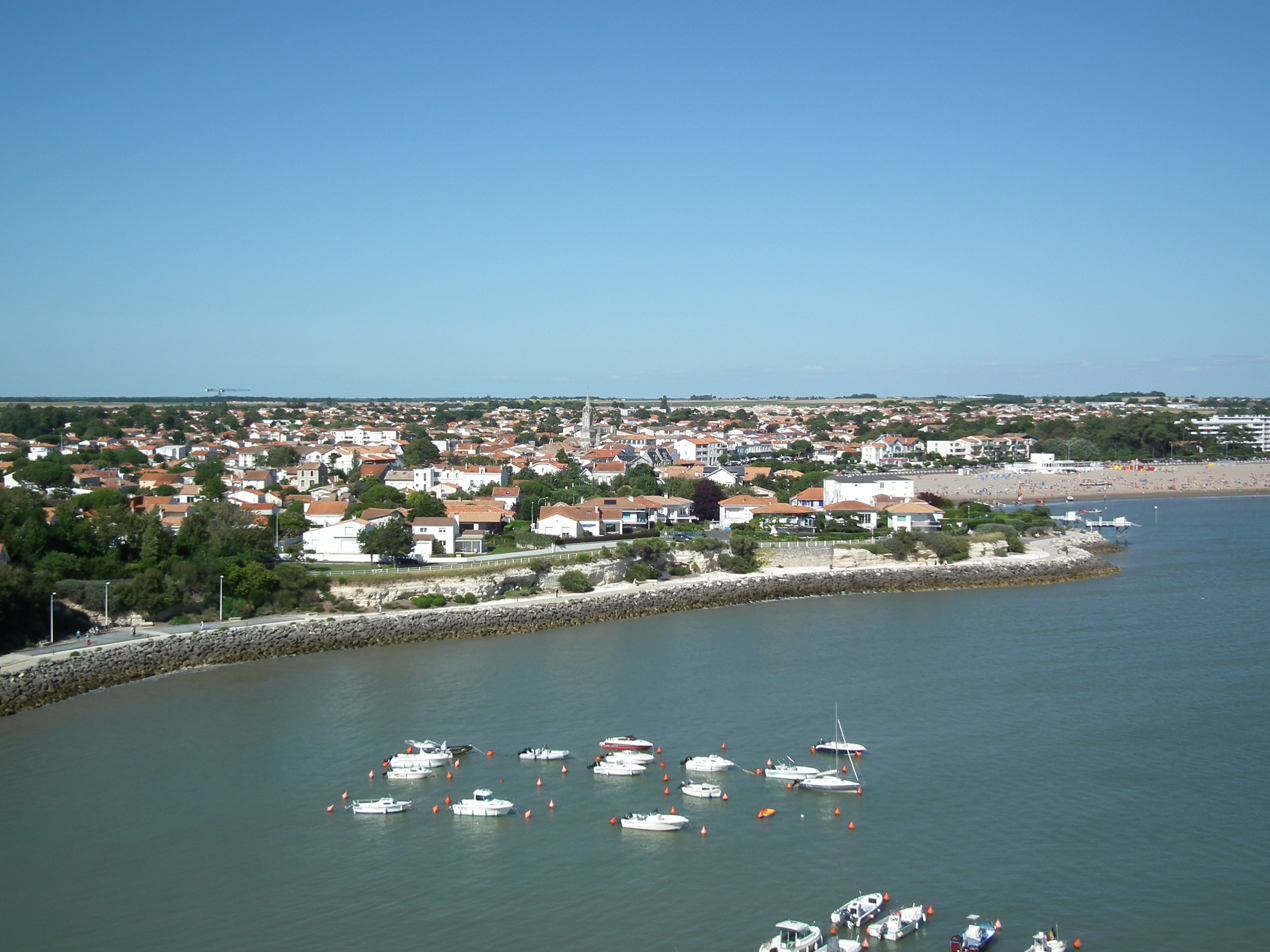
- Saint-Georges-de-Didonne seen from the lighthouse

- Coat of arms
- Location of Saint-Georges-de-Didonne
- Location within France Location within Nouvelle-Aquitaine
- Coordinates: 45°36′20″N 0°59′55″W
- Country: France
- Region: Nouvelle-Aquitaine
- Department: Charente-Maritime
- Arrondissement: Rochefort
- Canton: Royan
- Intercommunality: CA Royan Atlantique

Government
  - Mayor (2020–2026): François Richaud
- Area^{1}: 10.58 km^{2} (4.08 sq mi)
- Elevation: 15 m (49 ft)
- Highest elevation: 45 m (148 ft)
- Lowest elevation: 0 m (0 ft)
- Population (2023): 5,092
  - Density: 481.3/km^{2} (1,247/sq mi)
- Time zone: UTC+01:00 (CET)
  - Summer (DST): UTC+02:00 (CEST)
- INSEE/Postal code: 17333 /17110
- ^{1} French Land Register data, which excludes lakes, ponds, glaciers > 1 km^{2} (0.386 sq mi or 247 acres) and river estuaries.

Saint-Georges-de-Didonne (French pronunciation: [sɛ̃ ʒɔʁʒ də didɔn]) is a commune in the Charente-Maritime department and Nouvelle-Aquitaine region in southwestern France.

An important seaside resort of Royan and the coast of Beauty, on the right bank of the mouth of the Gironde estuary and adjacent Atlantic Ocean, Saint-Georges-de-Didonne is a major economic and tourist center of the Royan urban area, of which it is now becoming a residential suburb. It hosts over 50,000 people during the summer season.

== Population ==
Historical population

Year	Pop.	±% p.a.
1793	697	—
1800	702	+0.10%
1806	632	−1.74%
1821	768	+1.31%
1831	808	+0.51%
1836	909	+2.38%
1841	934	+0.54%
1846	905	−0.63%
1851	884	−0.47%
1856	905	+0.47%
1861	920	+0.33%
1866	964	+0.94%
1872	972	+0.14%
1876	1,081	+2.69%
1881	1,127	+0.84%
1886	1,251	+2.11%
1891	1,211	−0.65%
1896	1,355	+2.27%
1901	1,409	+0.78%

Year	Pop.	±% p.a.
1906	1,454	+0.63%
1911	1,541	+1.17%
1921	1,522	−0.12%
1926	1,782	+3.20%
1931	1,743	−0.44%
1936	2,004	+2.83%
1946	2,626	+2.74%
1954	3,391	+3.25%
1962	3,388	−0.01%
1968	3,680	+1.39%
1975	3,983	+1.14%
1982	4,287	+1.06%
1990	4,705	+1.17%
1999	5,034	+0.75%
2007	5,040	+0.01%
2012	5,054	+0.06%
2017	5,360	+1.18%
2023	5,092	−0.85%

Source: EHESS and INSEE (1968-2023)

== Notable people ==
- Jean-Michel Coulon, Abstract painter
- Colette Besson, Athlete
- Jean-Paul Gonzalez, Virologist

== See also ==
- Communes of the Charente-Maritime department
