= Lafaille =

Lafaille is a French surname. Notable people with the surname include:

- Bernard Lafaille (1900–1955), French engineer
- Jean-Christophe Lafaille (1965–2006), French mountain climber
