= Decauville railway at Exposition Universelle (1889) =

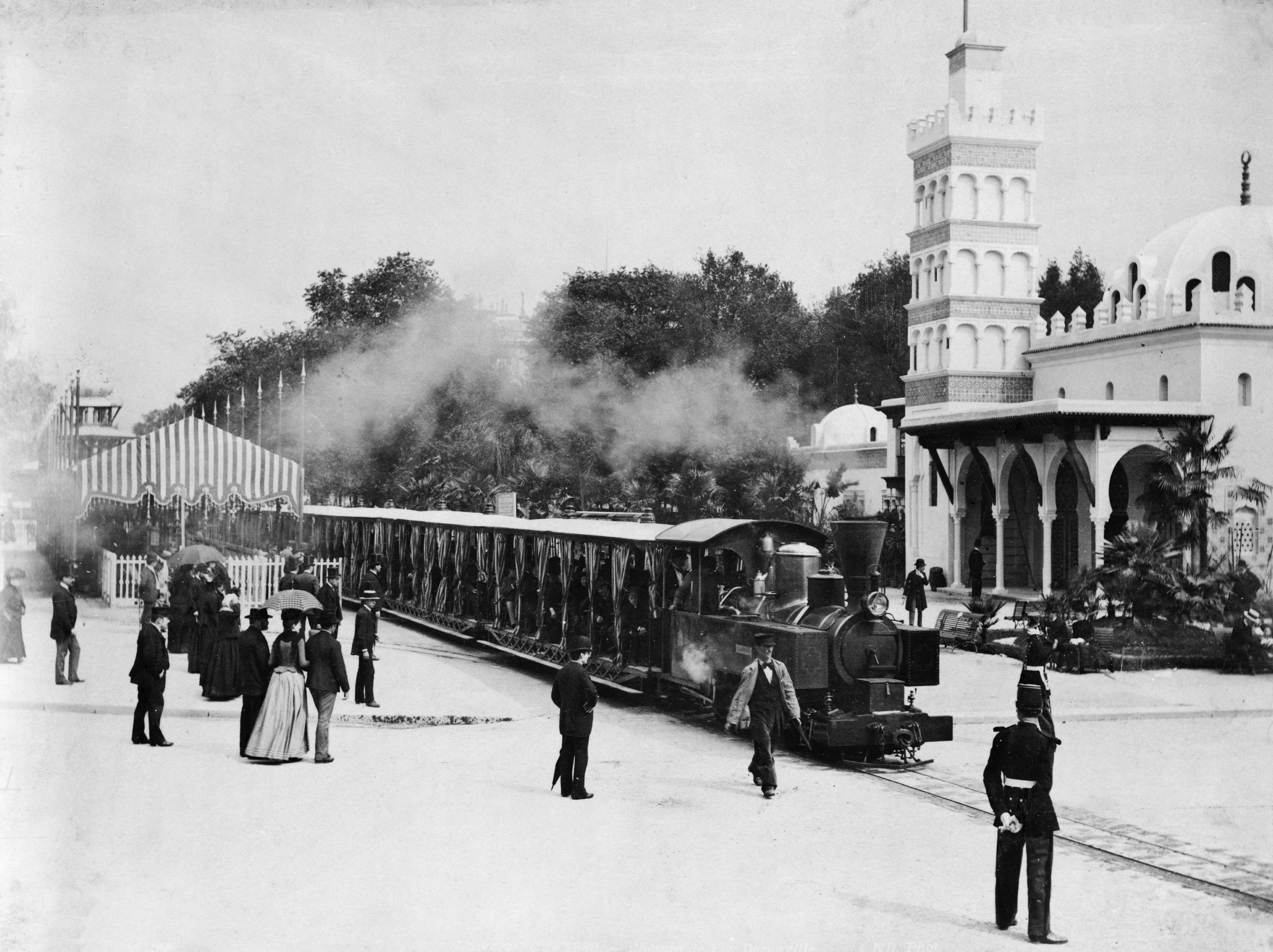

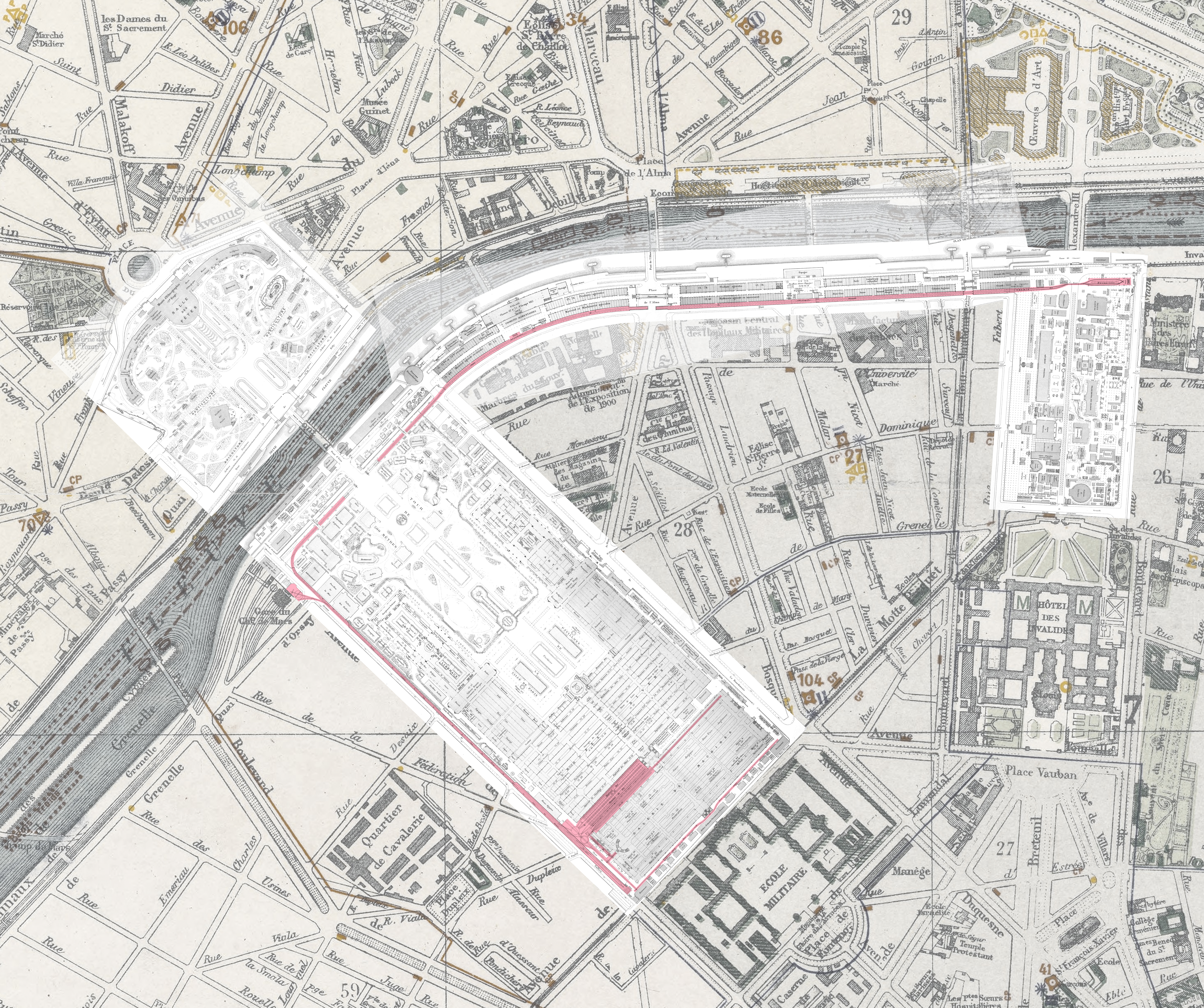
- Route

Technical
- Line length: 3 km (1.9 mi)
- Track gauge: 600 mm (1 ft 11 5/8 in)
- Operating speed: 10 kilometres per hour (6.2 mph)

The Decauville railway at Exposition Universelle (1889) (French Le chemin de fer intérieur de l'Exposition) was a 3 km (1.9 mi) long 600 mm (1 ft 11 5/8 in) gauge railway line, which operated during the Exposition Universelle world fair from 6 May to 31 October 1889 from Esplanade des Invalides to Avenue de Suffren in Paris.

== Route ==
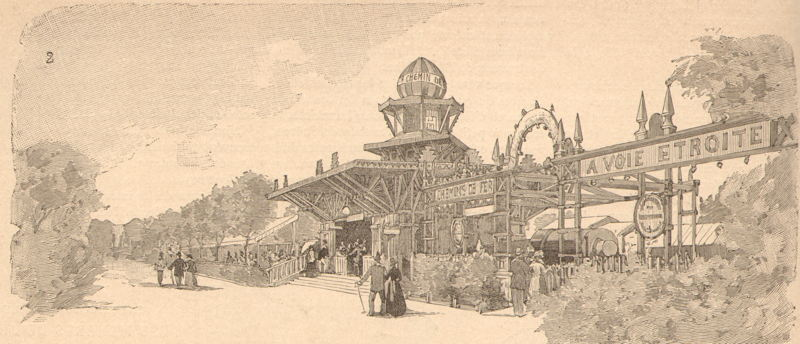
Station de la Concorde (Esplanade des Invalides)

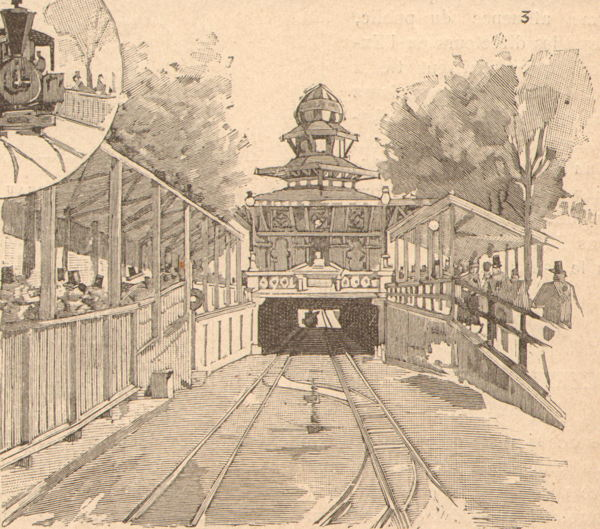
Underpass at Eiffel Tower (Pont d'Iéna)

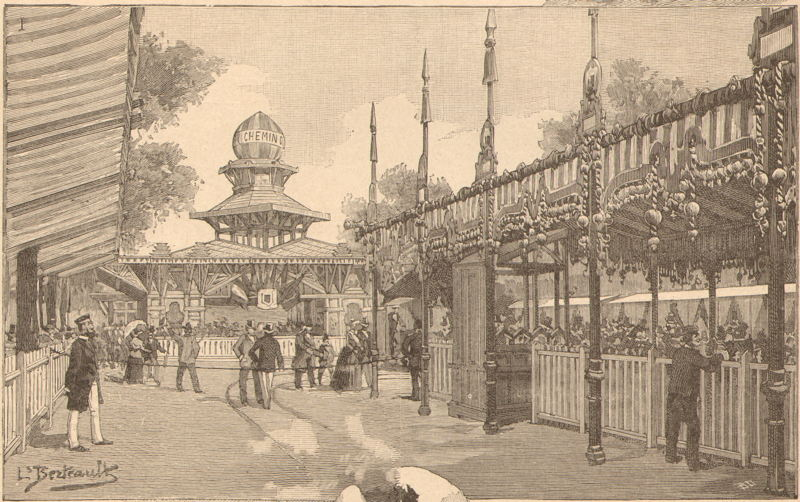
Station de la Tour Eiffel (Pont d'Iéna)

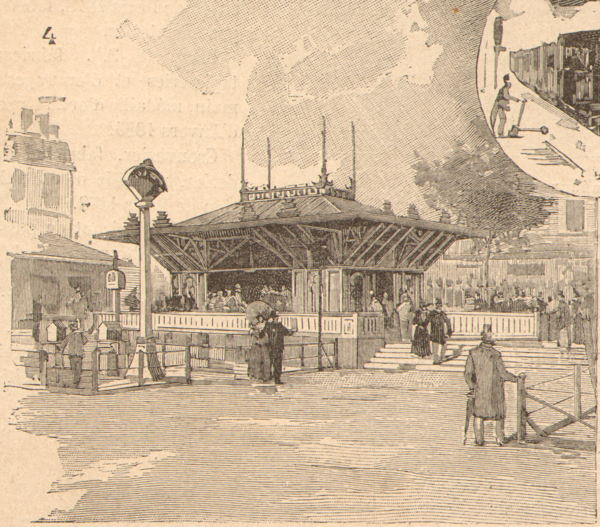
Station du Palais des Machines (Avenue de Suffren)

The 90-hectare (220-acre) site of the 1889 Exposition Universelle was too large to be explored on foot only. Therefore, an internal railway was built to connect the exhibition buildings on the Esplanade des Invalides with those under the Eiffel Tower. The more than 3-kilometre (1.9 mi) long railway line began 250 metres (270 yd) from the Concorde Bridge at the Ministry of Foreign Affairs near the Seine. It crossed the Esplanade des Invalides and followed the Quai d'Orsay on the banks of the Seine, within the fence of the Universal Exhibition, between the two rows of trees furthest away from the river. It crossed the Boulevard de la Tour-Maubourg at a level railroad crossing, ran through a 106-meter tunnel underneath Avenue Rapp and Avenue Bosquet, crossed the Avenue de la Bourdonnais and ran then through a deep cut past the Eiffel Tower, made then a perpendicular turn left onto Avenue de Suffren and followed it to the final stop at the Galerie des Machines.

In addition to the two termini, there were three stops at the Quai d'Orsay: the first at the Malar intersection, the second opposite the Palais des Produits Alimentaires, the third at the corner of Quai d'Orsay and Avenue de Suffren. The infrastructure and rolling stock were supplied by the Decauville company. The line was double-tracked with a distance of two meters between the opposing tracks.

The station buildings at the stops were visible from afar sights to attract the passengers. The son of one of the concessionaires, Louis Gaillot, a young architect, gave them shapes of unusual originality and functionality. The awnings, which covered the platforms, protected the passengers from the weather. At the final stations, the passengers could meet and rest at buffets.

== Construction ==
The track was designed by Monsieur Alphand, the general manager of the works, who commissioned Antoine Gaillot and Paul Gallotti of Gaillot et Cie to build the track under the supervision of Monsieur Lion, the exhibition's engineer. The works were led by the Deputy Chief Engineer J. Charton, who was responsible for the metalworking and dealt in particular with the construction of the railway on the Champ de Mars.

== Operation ==
Some specifications regulated the operation of this railway line by the concessionaire. The trains had to leave every ten minutes from 9 am to midnight from the terminus stations, i.e. six trains per hour or 54 trains per day in each direction. Although the route was completely fenced-off to the public over most of its length, a low top speed of 10 kilometres per hour (6.2 mph) was set. This maximum speed should even be reduced to 4 kilometres per hour (2.5 mph) at certain points along the route, especially at level crossings, where each train was preceded by a flagman. The length of the trains should not exceed 50 metres (160 ft), and all trains were equipped with a fast-acting brake.

The transport price was uniformly set at 0.25 Francs per person and 0.50 Francs for a seat in the saloon car, regardless of the length of the journey. The passengers were able to buy their tickets in advance at many places. It was sufficient to submit the tickets to the railway staff to get in the car. At the exit they were deposited at the turnstiles. It was claimed that the railway carried 6,342,446 visitors in just six months of operation.

For safety, there was a remote-controlled semaphore disc signal at each stop, which could only clear, when the barrier was closed. All trains were announced by a system of electric bells that led from the level crossings to the nearest station. Finally, there was a telephone service in each station.

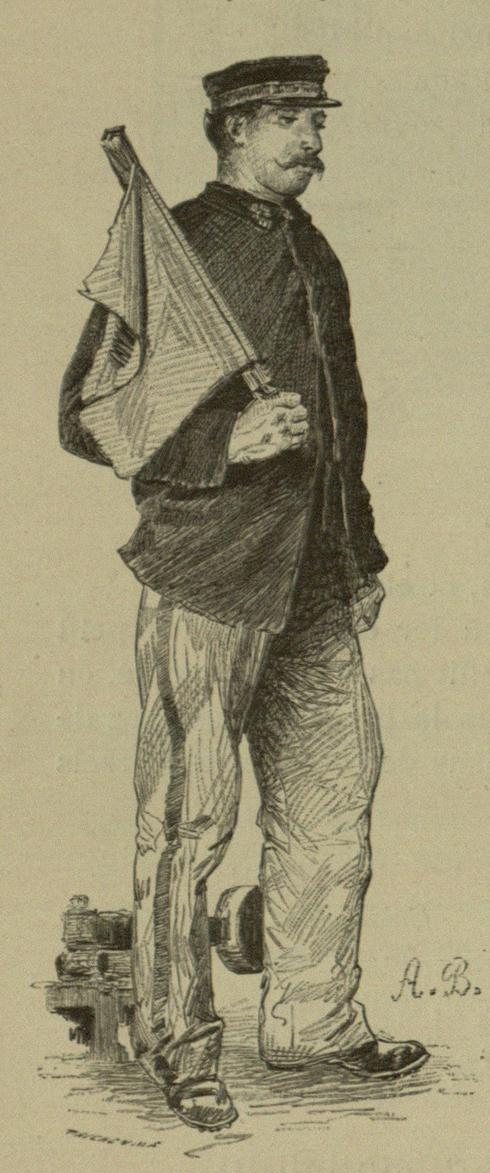
Flagman

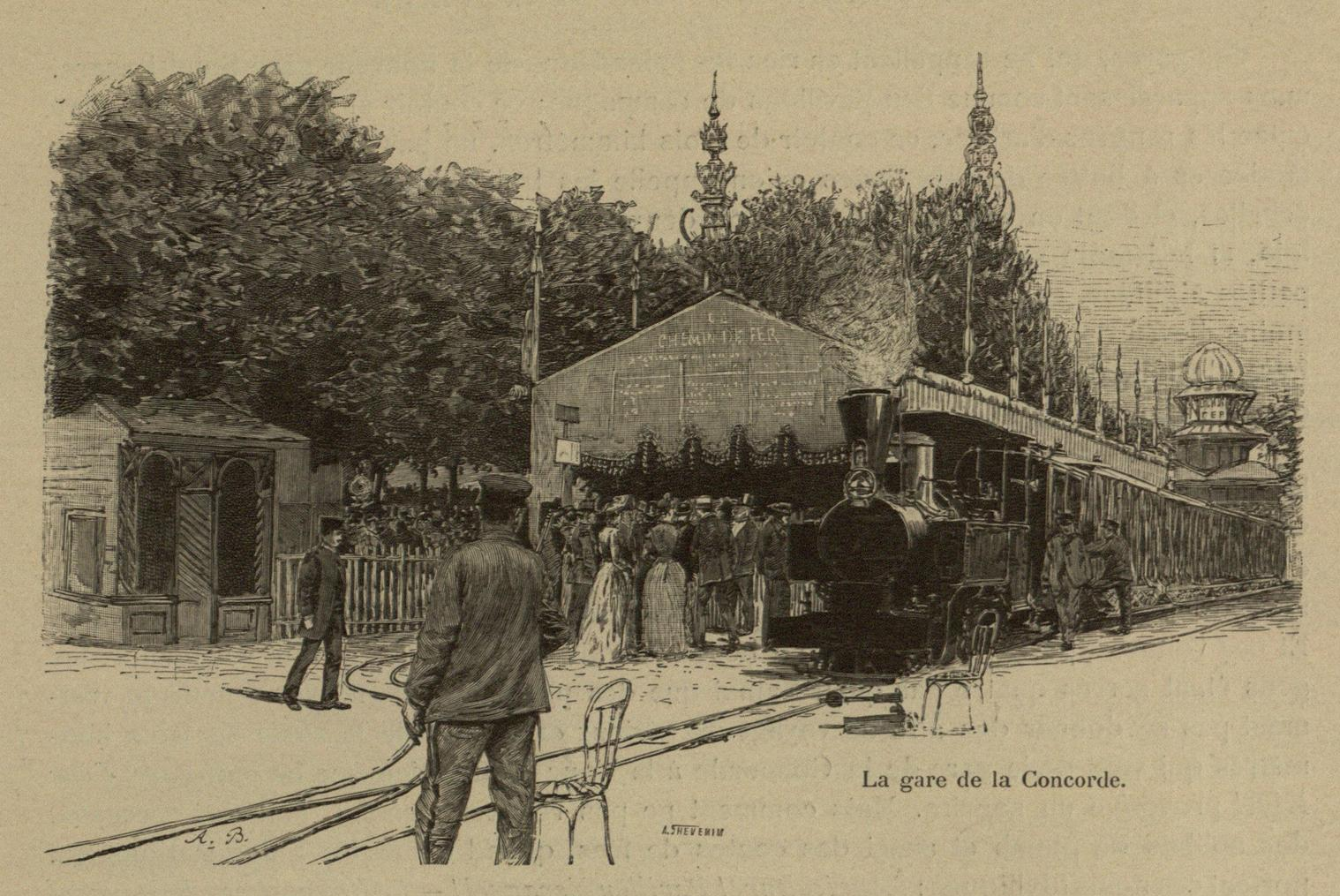
Station de la Concorde

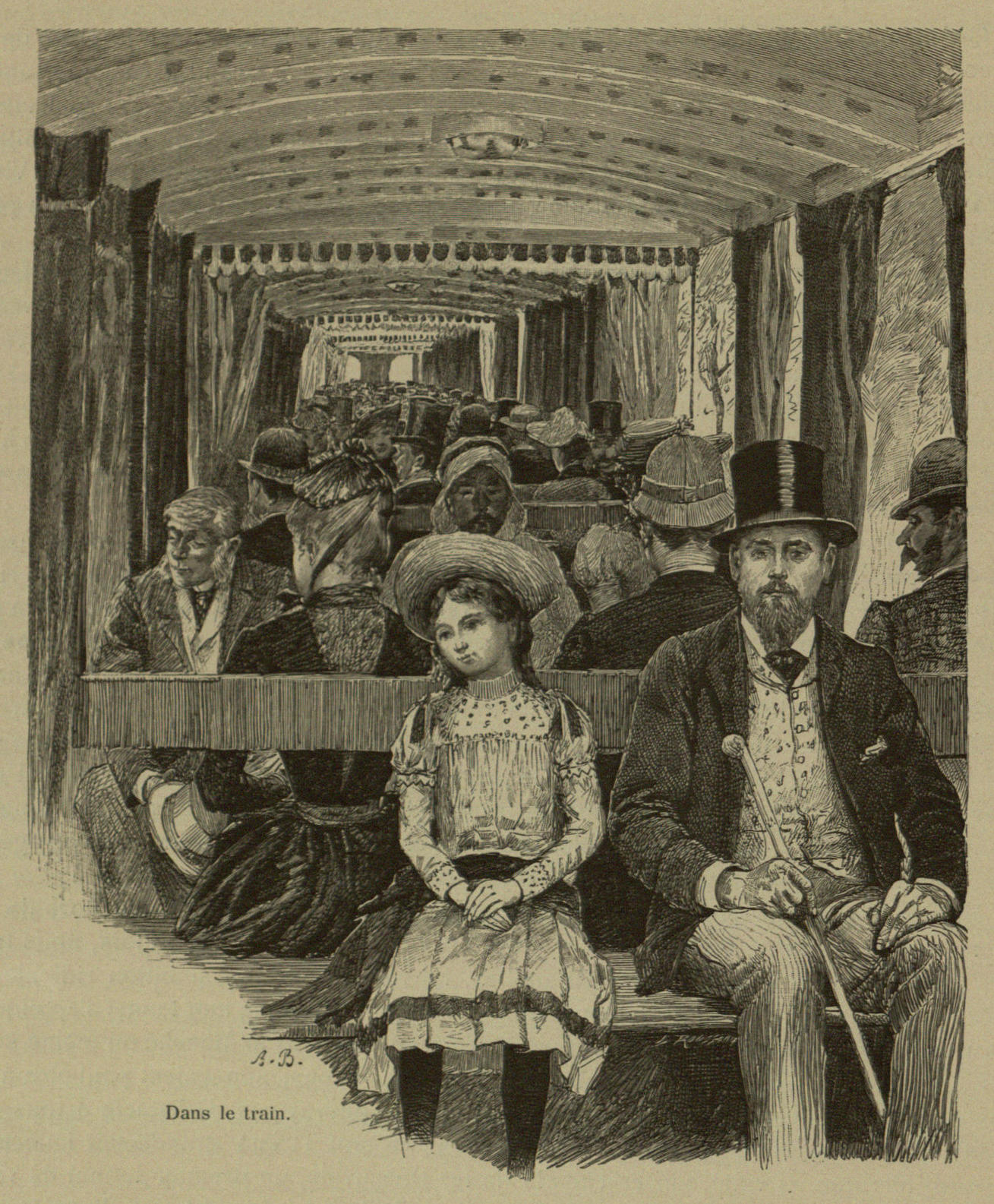
Interior

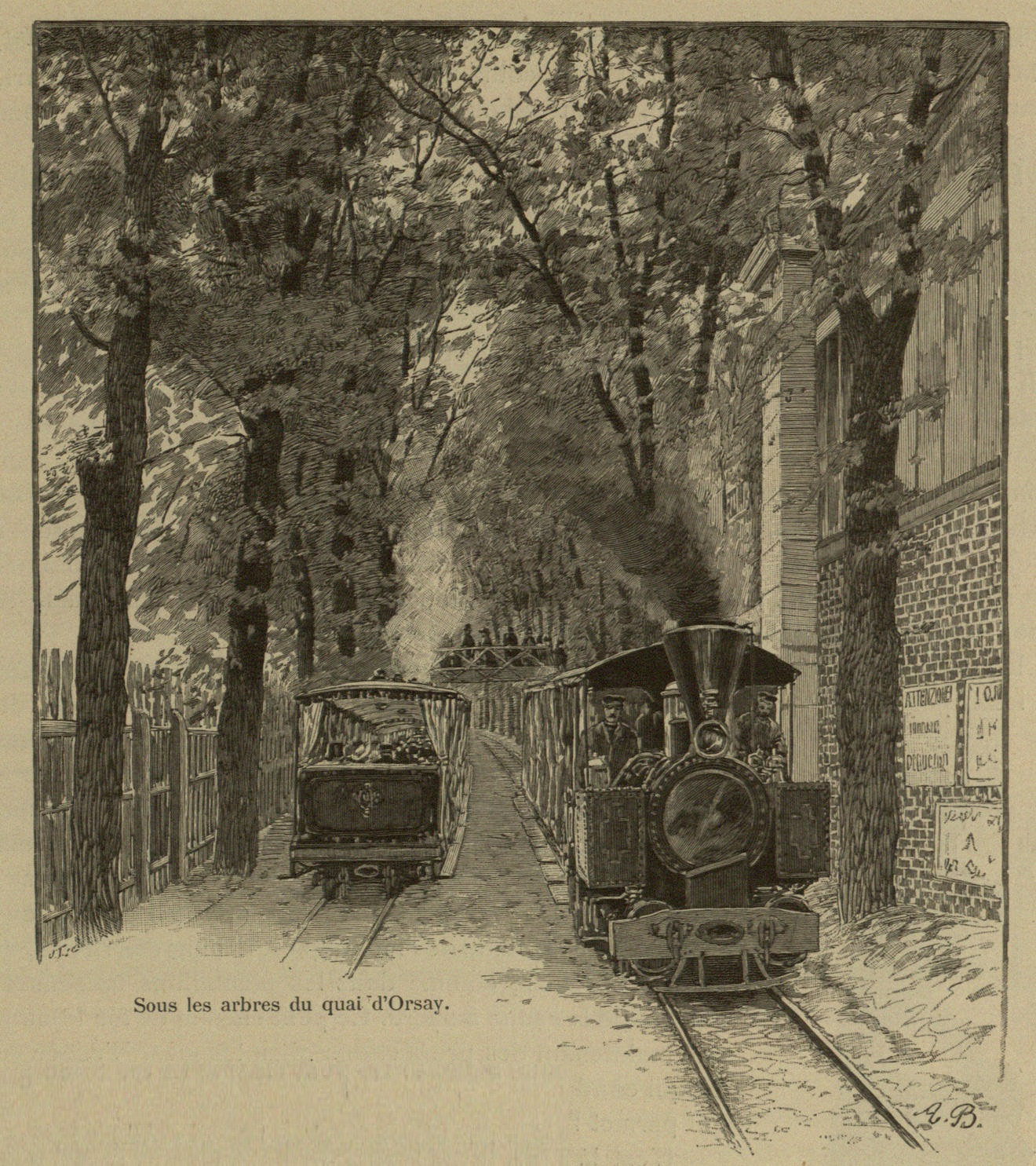
Double-track line

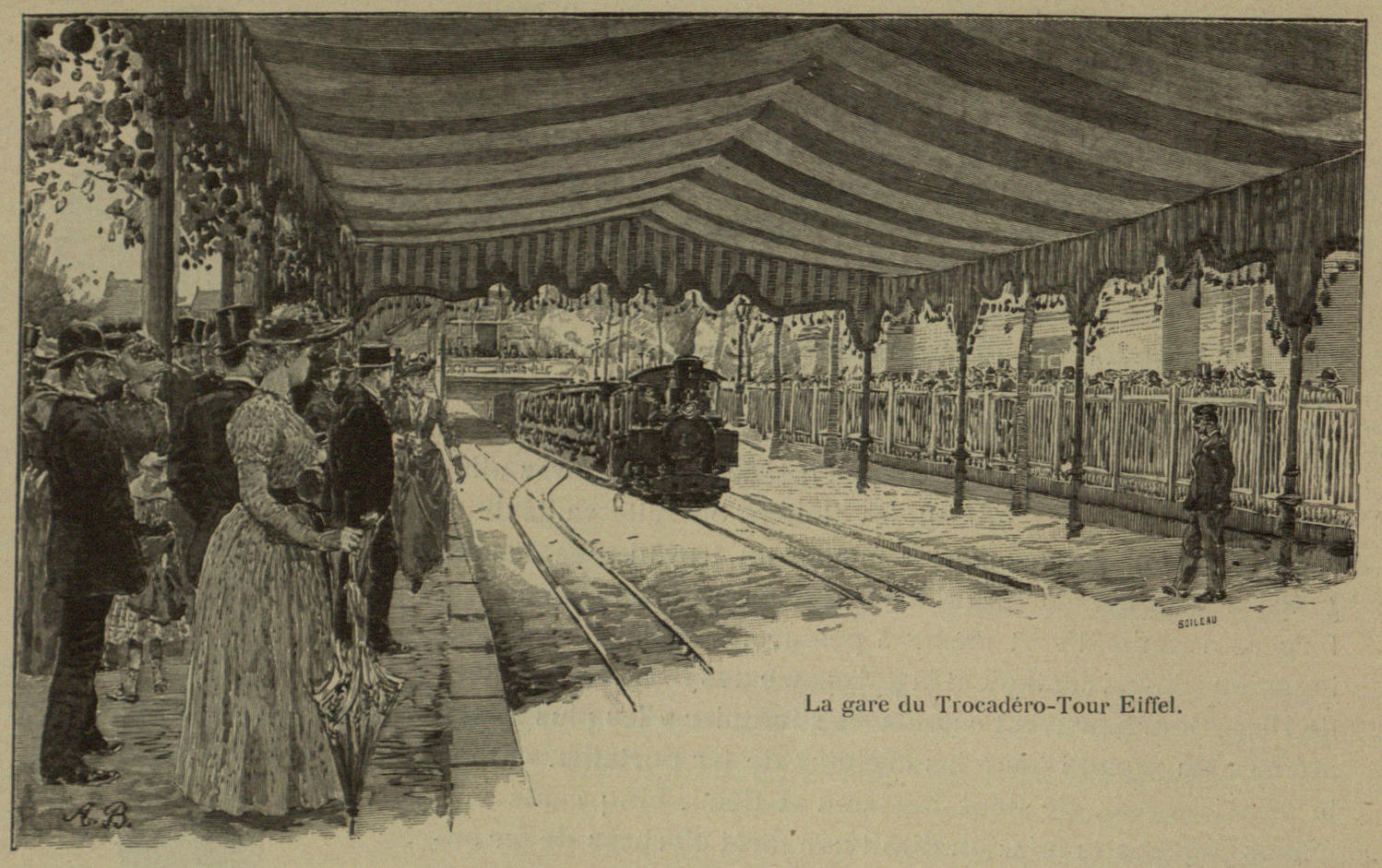
At the Eiffel tower

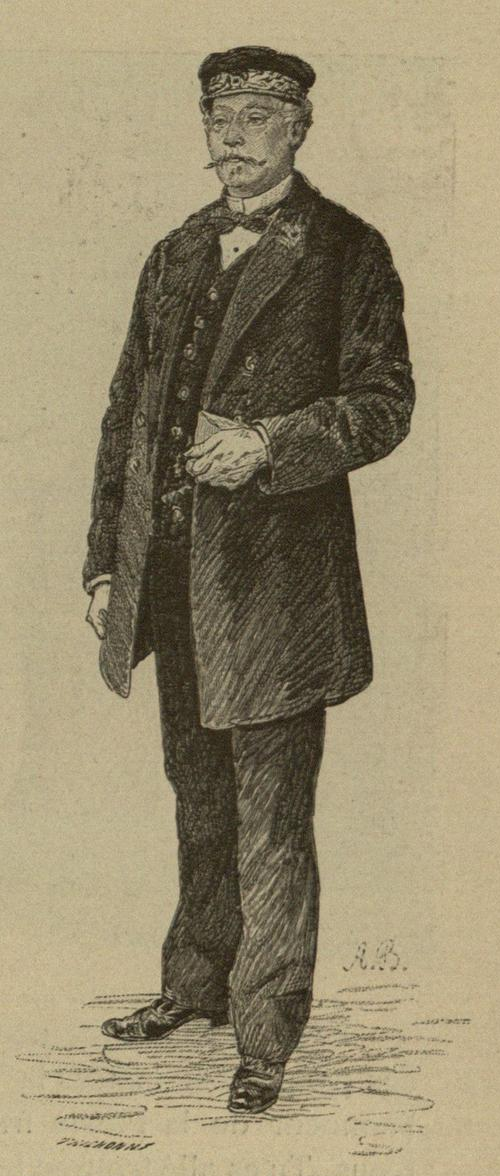
Station master

== Locomotives ==
Steam locomotives of different types were used. One of the most interesting came from the artillery captain Péchot. This Fairlie locomotive and was specially designed for being used by the army. There were also Mallet locomotives that were used under the same conditions as the previous ones. The cars, which were used for passenger traffic, were of different designs, which resembled those of the Ministry of the Armed Forces.

Approximately 12 steam locomotives and 100 carriages of different types were used. They had names like Australie, Turkestan, Massouah, Kairoruan, Dumbarton and Hanoi after the locations, where Decauville trains were used. Two of them, Massouah and Turkestan, two passenger cars and some pieces of rail track were subsequently sold to the Helsingborg–Råå–Ramlösa Järnväg in Sweden. Others were re-used at the Chemins de fer du Calvados, Tramway de Royan, the Chemins de fer du Calvados and the Decauville railway at Diego Suarez in Madagascar.

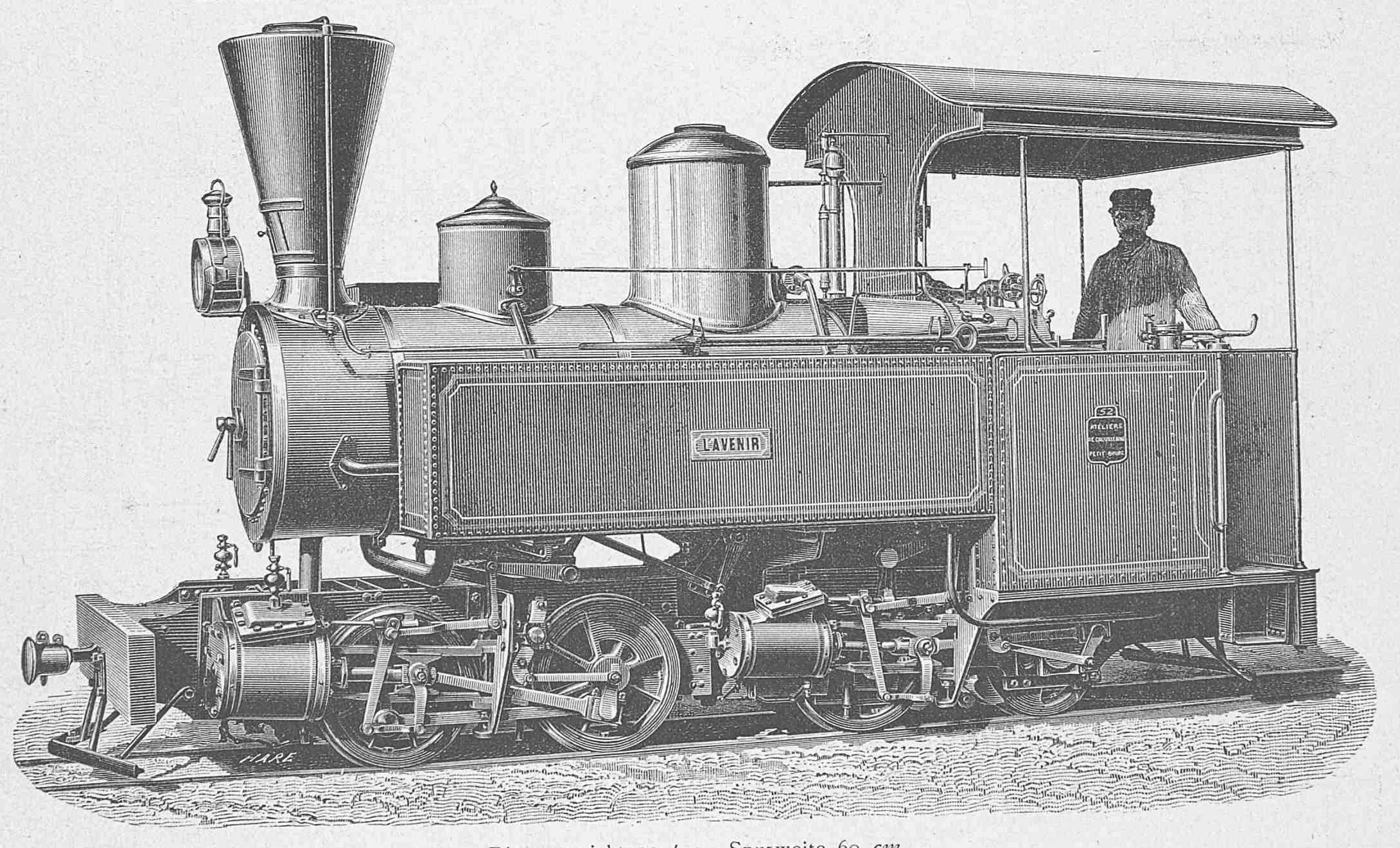
L'Avenir by Tubize

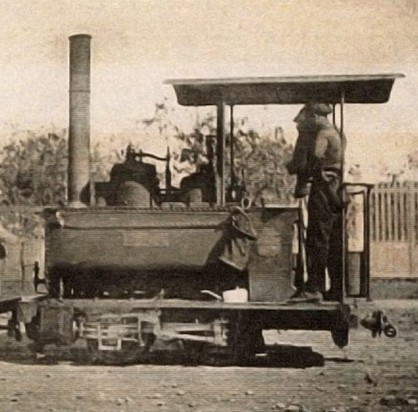
La Mignone

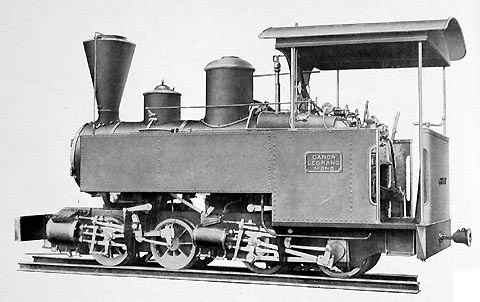
Kosta by Tubize

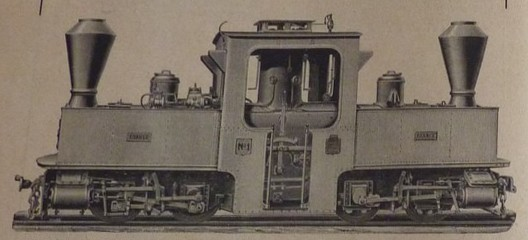
France by Péchot

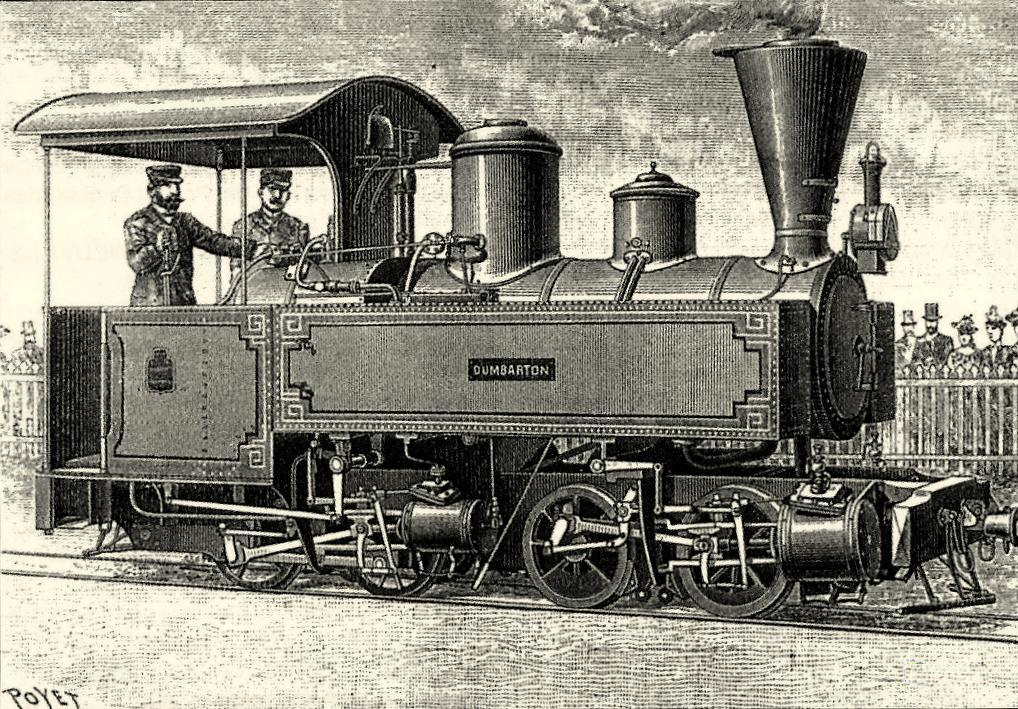
Dumbarton by Tubize

== See also ==
- List of Decauville railways
