= Canton of Royan =

Administrative division of France

Coordinates: 45.63°N 1.03°W

The canton of Royan is an administrative division of the Charente-Maritime department, western France. It was created at the French canton reorganisation which came into effect in March 2015. Its seat is in Royan.

It consists of the following communes:

1. Royan
2. Saint-Georges-de-Didonne
3. Vaux-sur-Mer

The Canton of Royan was organized in the district of Rochefort. The altitude varies from 0 m (Breuillet) to 50 m (Saint-Palais-sur-Mer) for an average altitude of 18 m.

The Canton of Royan was divided in 1973 leading to the formation of Canton of Royan-Ouest.
