= Jeanne Pelisson-Mallet =

French painter

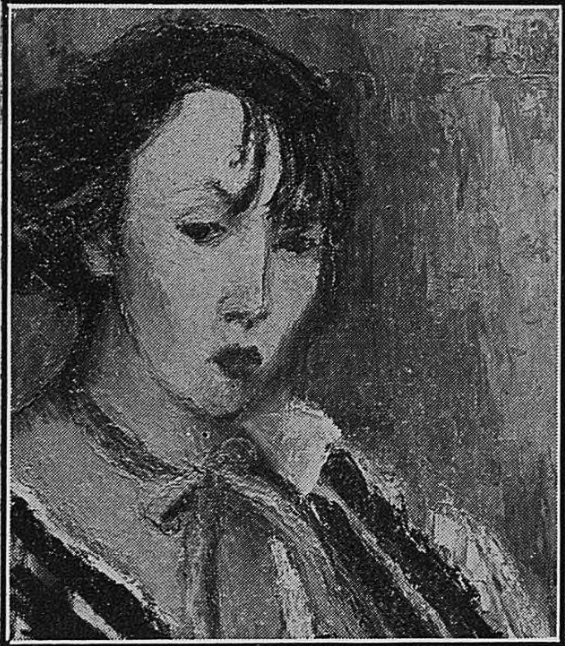
- Born: 1873; Royan (France)
- Died: 1961 (aged 87–88)
- Known for: Painter
- Movement: Post-Impressionism

Jeanne Pelisson-Mallet (1873 in Royan, France – 1961), was a French painter.

== Biography ==
Jeanne Pélisson was a Post-Impressionist painter.

Beginning as a fauvist, she moved into a Post-Impressionist style and was affiliated with an art movement known as the School of Paris. She painted landscapes, still lifes, nudes and portraits.

Since 1920s Pelisson exhibited at the Salon des Tuileries. The painter exhibited at the Salon d'Automne, at the Salon des Indépendants.

In 1932, another major solo exhibition was held at the Galerie Mallet.

In the 1930s, Jeanne was a member and exhibited her works at Femmes Artistes Modernes (F. A. M.).

Her husband was Dr Raymond Mallet (1882-1936)

== Illustrations ==
- L'Archer (Toulouse); 1932-02

== Notes ==
- Bénézit, 1976 : Jeanne Pelisson-Mallet
