= Royan =

Royan Roeyan (Poitevin–Saintongeais)
- Commune
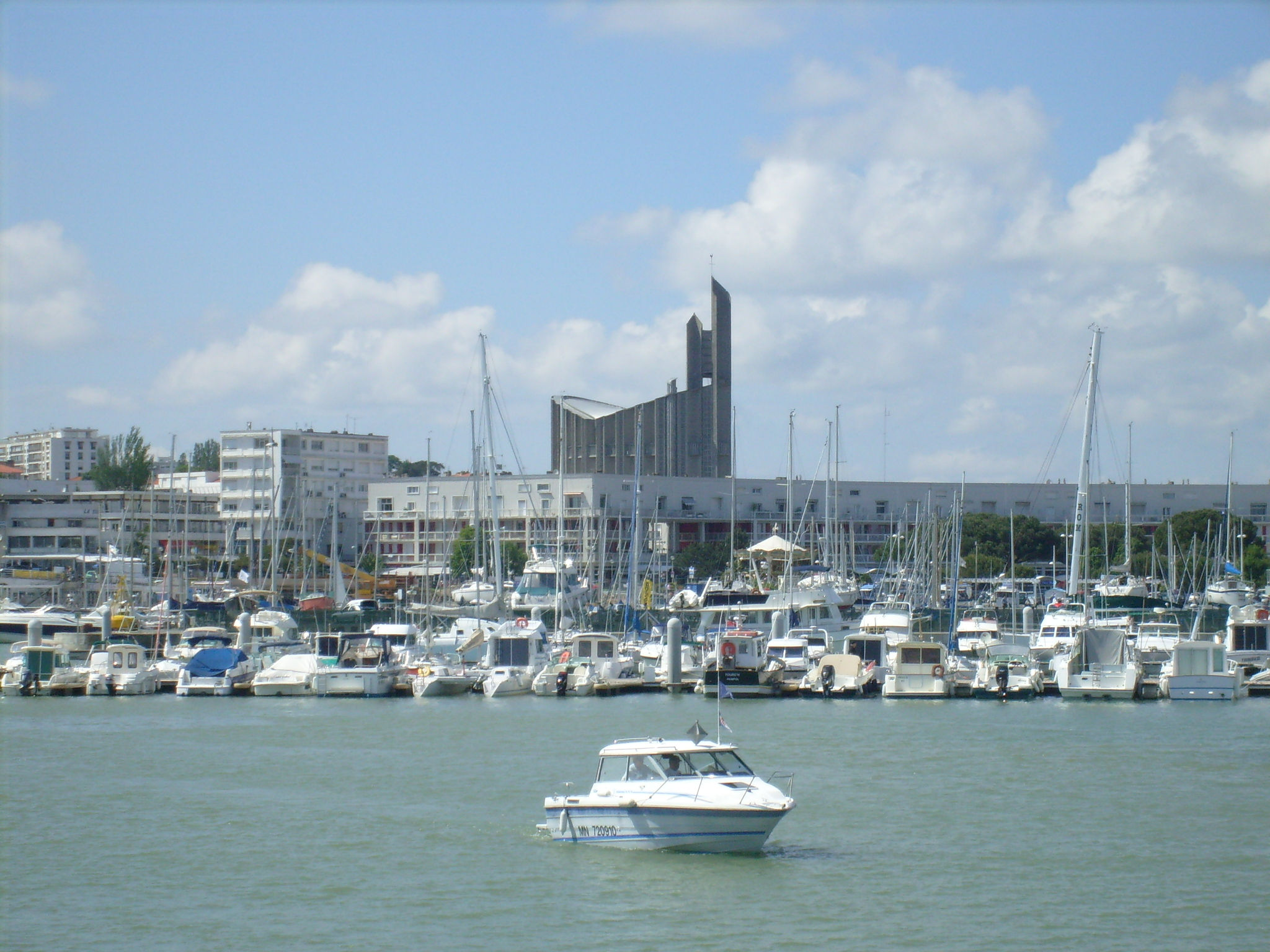
- The port of Royan

- Coat of arms
- Location of Royan
- Location within France Location within Nouvelle-Aquitaine
- Coordinates: 45°37′N 1°02′W
- Country: France
- Region: Nouvelle-Aquitaine
- Department: Charente-Maritime
- Arrondissement: Rochefort
- Canton: Royan
- Intercommunality: CA Royan Atlantique

Government
  - Mayor (2020–2026): Patrick Marengo
- Area^{1}: 19.30 km^{2} (7.45 sq mi)
- Elevation: 20 m (66 ft)
- Highest elevation: 35 m (115 ft)
- Lowest elevation: 0 m (0 ft)
- Population (2023): 19,425
  - Density: 1,006/km^{2} (2,607/sq mi)
- Time zone: UTC+01:00 (CET)
  - Summer (DST): UTC+02:00 (CEST)
- INSEE/Postal code: 17306 /17200
- ^{1} French Land Register data, which excludes lakes, ponds, glaciers > 1 km^{2} (0.386 sq mi or 247 acres) and river estuaries.

Royan (French pronunciation: [ʁwajɑ̃]; Roeyan [ʁwejɑ̃] in the Saintongeais dialect; Occitan: Roian) is a commune and town in the south-west of France, in the department of Charente-Maritime in the Nouvelle-Aquitaine region. Capital of the Côte de Beauté, Royan is one of the main French Atlantic coastal resort towns, and has five beaches, a marina for over 1,000 boats, and an active fishing port.

Royan is located on the peninsula of Arvert, at the mouth of the Gironde estuary on its eastern shore. Royan was once of strategic importance, coveted in particular by the Visigoths and the Vikings. During the Reformation the city became a Protestant stronghold, and was besieged and destroyed by King Louis XIII (ruled 1610–43). During the Bourbon Restoration (1814–1830), and especially during the Second Empire (1852–1870), Royan was celebrated for its sea baths. It attracted many artists during the Roaring Twenties.

Allied bombing between September 1944 and April 1945 destroyed the town. Known then as the "martyred city", it was declared a "Laboratory of research on urbanism", and it is now a showcase of the Modernist architecture of the 1950s. It was classified as a Town of Art and History (Ville d'Art et d'Histoire) in 2010. Royan today is a tourist and cultural hub, with some 90,000 visitors each summer season.

== Geography ==
Royan is a seaside resort town situated in the west of the department of Charente-Maritime, in the former province of Saintonge. It lies near the Atlantic coast on the eastern shore of the mouth of the Gironde, Europe's largest estuary. Along the coastline of the commune, limestone cliffs alternate with the five beaches known locally as conches.

== Geology ==
The town of Royan is built on a calcareous rock plateau dating from the Cretaceous Period (c. 150 million years ago). It is bounded by the Pousseau marshes to the north and the Pontaillac marshes to the west. The estuary, the cliffs and the conches were shaped approximately 66 million years ago by the folding of limestone layers as the Alps and the Pyrenees formed.

== Transport ==
=== Road ===
Royan is approximately 65 kilometres (40 mi) from the administrative capital (prefecture) of the department, La Rochelle, by departmental road D 733 and national road (Route nationale, RN) 137. It is 98 km (61 mi) from Bordeaux by departmental road D 730 and the A10 freeway, and 507 km (315 mi) from Paris. Between Royan and the town of Saintes, the historic capital of Saintonge and an important centre of art and history, travel time on the RN 150 is just under half an hour.

=== Train ===
Royan SNCF railway station is the terminus of a line connecting the town to Saintes, Angoulême, and Niort (for the high-speed TGV rail link to Bordeaux and Paris).

Across the Gironde estuary, the station of La Pointe-de-Grave at Le Verdon-sur-Mer connects through the Médoc region to Bordeaux-Saint-Jean station.

The Tramways de Royan provided mainly passenger transport along the coast from 1890 to 1945 and partially even longer.

=== Airports ===
The conurbation of Royan does not have its own airport. 30 km (19 mi) away, Rochefort-Saint-Agnant Airport offers flights to several European destinations, including the British Isles. La Rochelle – Île de Ré Airport is 70 km (43 mi) away. 100 km (62 mi) to the south, Bordeaux–Mérignac Airport provides international connections.

=== Ferry ===
A ferry provides bicycle, car and lorry transport across the Gironde estuary to Le Verdon-sur-Mer in the Médoc region. The crossing takes about 30 minutes.

== Climate ==
The climate is oceanic: rainfall is relatively moderate in autumn and in winter and the winters are mild. Sea breezes keep summer temperatures moderate. Two winds, the north-westerly noroît and the south-westerly suroît, blow in from the ocean and along the coast of the department. The very high average insolation of 2,250 hours a year is comparable to the French Riviera.

Charente-Maritime was the department most affected by Cyclone Martin on 27 December 1999. Winds speeds of up to 198 kilometres per hour (123 mph) were recorded on the island of Oléron, and 194 kilometres per hour (121 mph) in Royan, with severe damage to local buildings, woodland and harbour facilities.

Climate data for Royan - Medis (RYN), elevation: 12 m (39 ft) (1991-2020 normals, extremes 1991-present)
Month	Jan	Feb	Mar	Apr	May	Jun	Jul	Aug	Sep	Oct	Nov	Dec	Year
Record high °C (°F)	17.6 (63.7)	22.9 (73.2)	26.0 (78.8)	29.0 (84.2)	35.3 (95.5)	41.7 (107.1)	40.5 (104.9)	39.9 (103.8)	35.2 (95.4)	31.5 (88.7)	23.5 (74.3)	19.3 (66.7)	39.9 (103.8)
Mean daily maximum °C (°F)	9.7 (49.5)	11.1 (52.0)	14.3 (57.7)	16.8 (62.2)	20.4 (68.7)	23.6 (74.5)	25.4 (77.7)	25.7 (78.3)	23.1 (73.6)	18.8 (65.8)	13.6 (56.5)	10.4 (50.7)	17.7 (63.9)
Daily mean °C (°F)	6.7 (44.1)	7.3 (45.1)	9.8 (49.6)	12.1 (53.8)	15.6 (60.1)	18.7 (65.7)	20.4 (68.7)	20.5 (68.9)	17.8 (64.0)	14.6 (58.3)	10.2 (50.4)	7.4 (45.3)	13.4 (56.1)
Mean daily minimum °C (°F)	3.7 (38.7)	3.5 (38.3)	5.4 (41.7)	7.3 (45.1)	10.8 (51.4)	13.8 (56.8)	15.4 (59.7)	15.2 (59.4)	12.6 (54.7)	10.5 (50.9)	6.8 (44.2)	4.3 (39.7)	9.1 (48.4)
Record low °C (°F)	−9.5 (14.9)	−9.2 (15.4)	−9.1 (15.6)	−2.9 (26.8)	1.3 (34.3)	5.5 (41.9)	7.8 (46.0)	8.0 (46.4)	4.6 (40.3)	−2.5 (27.5)	−7.0 (19.4)	−8.9 (16.0)	−9.5 (14.9)
Average precipitation mm (inches)	87.3 (3.44)	60.4 (2.38)	60.1 (2.37)	68.5 (2.70)	63.1 (2.48)	53.7 (2.11)	42.6 (1.68)	49.7 (1.96)	71.2 (2.80)	88.9 (3.50)	107.3 (4.22)	102.7 (4.04)	855.5 (33.68)
Average precipitation days (≥ 1.0 mm)	12.9	10.4	10.2	10.4	9.0	7.3	6.9	6.9	8.3	11.1	13.4	13.6	120.6
Mean monthly sunshine hours	87.5	137.8	177.9	219.2	248.3	267.7	294.7	265.3	227.1	149.5	102.3	85.8	2,263.1
Source 1: Meteociel
Source 2: Infoclimat (sunshine hours)

== History ==
=== Prehistory and antiquity ===
The site of Royan has been occupied since prehistoric times, as evidenced by archaeological finds of knapped flint. The Santones, a Celtic people, were early arrivals on the peninsula of Arvert. The Romans developed vineyards, oyster farming, and the saltern technique for salt production. The poet Tibullus celebrates the coast after the victory of his patron, the general Marcus Valerius Messalla Corvinus, and the poet Ausonius built a villa here. The Visigoths arrived in Saintes in 418. In 419, defensive walls were built around Royan. Gregory of Tours mentions the usurpation of the church of Royan by the Arian Visigoths. In the summer of 844, the Vikings came up the Gironde, plundering everything in their path.

=== Middle Ages ===
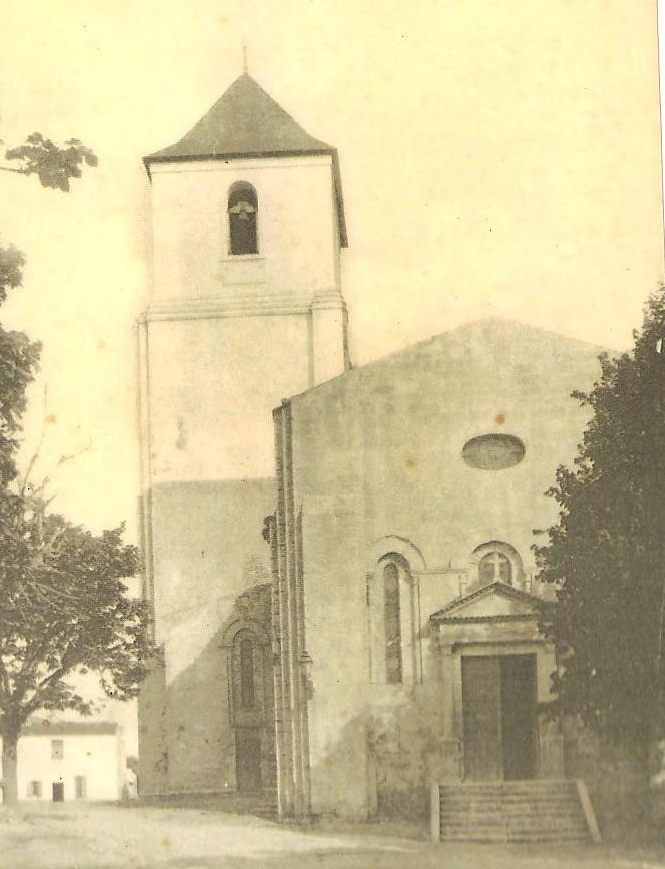
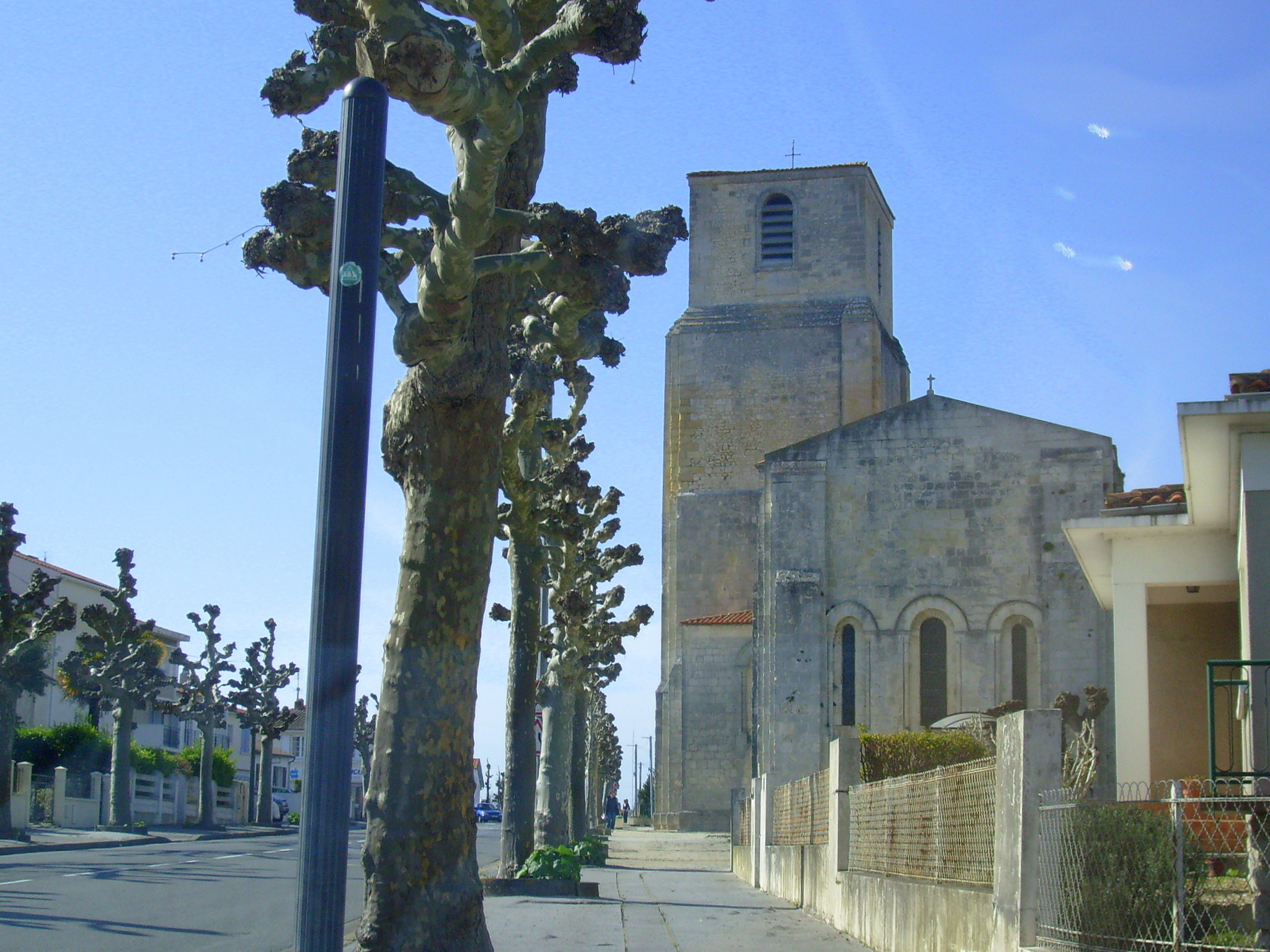
Left image: Saint-Pierre church in 1918
Right image: Saint-Pierre church in 2010

At the beginning of the 11th century, a precarious peace returned to the peninsula. Small fiefdoms and abbeys emerged. Between 1050 and 1075, the Prieuré de Saint-Vivien de Saintes built the Saint Pierre priory on the Saint-Pierre plateau, two kilometres from Royan and a small settlement grew there. In 1092, the Grande-Sauve Abbey built the Saint Nicolas priory nearby, on the Foncillon rock on the coast. A small castle in Royan protected the beach of Grande Conche, used as a harbour. Harbour activity was significant by the end of the 11th century, and many vessels used the Gironde estuary as a stopping point while waiting for favourable winds or currents. The Lord of Didonne took advantage of this to impose a tax on any boat mooring at the foot of the castle.

In 1137, Eleanor of Aquitaine married King Louis VII of France. Royan became part of the Duchy of Aquitaine, under direct royal control. In 1152, the marriage was annulled and Eleanor married Henry Plantagenet, who became King Henry II of England in 1154. Royan passed into English control.

The English king strengthened the town's defences with robust bulwarks and a solid keep. The various taxes paid by ships in the 13th century were codified by the Lords of Royan in 1232 as the Custom of Royan (Coutume de Royan). On May 20, 1242, King Henry III of England, at war with King Louis IX of France (Saint Louis), landed at Royan with 300 knights. Although defeated at Taillebourg, under the Treaty of Paris (1259) the English retained control of the south of Saintonge, and with it the town of Royan. In 1355, during the Hundred Years' War, the Black Prince, heir to the throne of England, occupied Saintonge and further strengthened Royan's defences. Royan became a large town, administered by twelve magistrates (échevins) and twelve councillors. In 1451, at the end of the Hundred Years' War, the region had become definitively French but the town was in ruins.

In 1458, Marie de Valois (1444–1473), natural daughter of King Charles VII of France and his mistress Agnès Sorel, married Olivier de Coëtivy, Count of Taillebourg. She brought a dowry of 12,000 écus and the fiefdoms, or châtellenies, of Royan and Mornac. In 1501, by his marriage to Louise de Coëtivy, Charles de la Trémoille became Baron of Royan. Commerce developed in the town, but access was made difficult by the town's fortifications. From the beginning of the 16th century, a new quarter developed along the beachfront.

During the French Wars of Religion in the 16th century, many of the great captains of the time fought beneath the walls of the citadel, among them Henri de Navarre, who would become King Henry III of Navarre and then King Henry IV of France, and Pierre de Bourdeille, seigneur de Brantôme, later a prior of Saint-Pierre-de-Royan). In 1592, Henry IV made the town a marquisate, granted to Gilbert de la Trémoille. At the beginning of the 17th century, Jean Louis de Nogaret de La Valette, the first Duke of Épernon, considered Royan "one of better places of its size in France". After the signing of the Edict of Nantes in 1598, it became a Protestant stronghold.

The town was besieged a first time in 1622 by King Louis XIII, but resisted. A second siege in 1623 caused great hardship. Many inhabitants abandoned the city and were banned from returning. The garrison was forced to surrender. In 1631, Cardinal Richelieu ordered the levelling of the town; the citadel was dismantled, and the ditches were filled in. The city, which no longer had a church, was associated with the rural parish of Saint Pierre.

After the revocation of the Edict of Nantes, a majority of the population emigrated, many people going to the Dutch Republic. Persecution continued under King Louis XV. A great storm in 1735 destroyed the harbour embankment, and navigation was not restored until the 19th century.

=== French Revolution ===
On 22 December 1789, the National Constituent Assembly set up in the early stages of the French Revolution voted for the administrative division of France into departments in place of the former provinces. The department of Charente-Inférieure was created on 4 March 1790 with the entry into force of this law. Each department was subdivided into districts, and each district into cantons. Royan became the administrative centre of its canton.

Royan elected a city council at that time, chaired by Daniel Renaud, a Protestant, and mayor Nicolas-Thérese Vallet of Salignac. On July 12, 1790, the National Constituent Assembly passed a law, the Civil Constitution of the Clergy, which subordinated the Catholic Church to the government. The priests of the parishes of Royan, Vaux and Saint-Sulpice refused to take an obligatory oath of allegiance to France under this law, so joining the group of "refractory priests" (prêtres réfractaires) condemned to deportation.

Throughout the country, church properties were seized. In Royan, the 1622 convent of the Récollets, set in grounds of 33 hectares (82 acres), was put up for sale. It was bought on 25 February 1791, and then demolished, by shipowner Jean Boisseau.

As elsewhere, economic crisis caused growing dissatisfaction in Royan. To counter this, patriotic clubs were formed. On 14 July 1790, on the occasion of the first Festival of the Federation (Fête de la Fédération celebrations the French Revolution, a ceremony was organized in the church of Saint Pierre for the swearing of the solemn oath to the coming first French Constitution, adopted in 1791.

At the end of November 1790, mayor Nicolas-Thérese Vallet of Salignac was removed from office and was replaced by François d' Aulnis de Puiraveaux. In 1791, Daniel Renaud was elected mayor of the commune. In May 1791, the pro-republican, anti-royalist Society of the Friends of the Constitution established a branch in Royan. In general terms, however, the Reign of Terror (la Terreur) after the creation of the First French Republic had little impact in the area, and few of the local nobles were affected.

=== Seaside resort ===
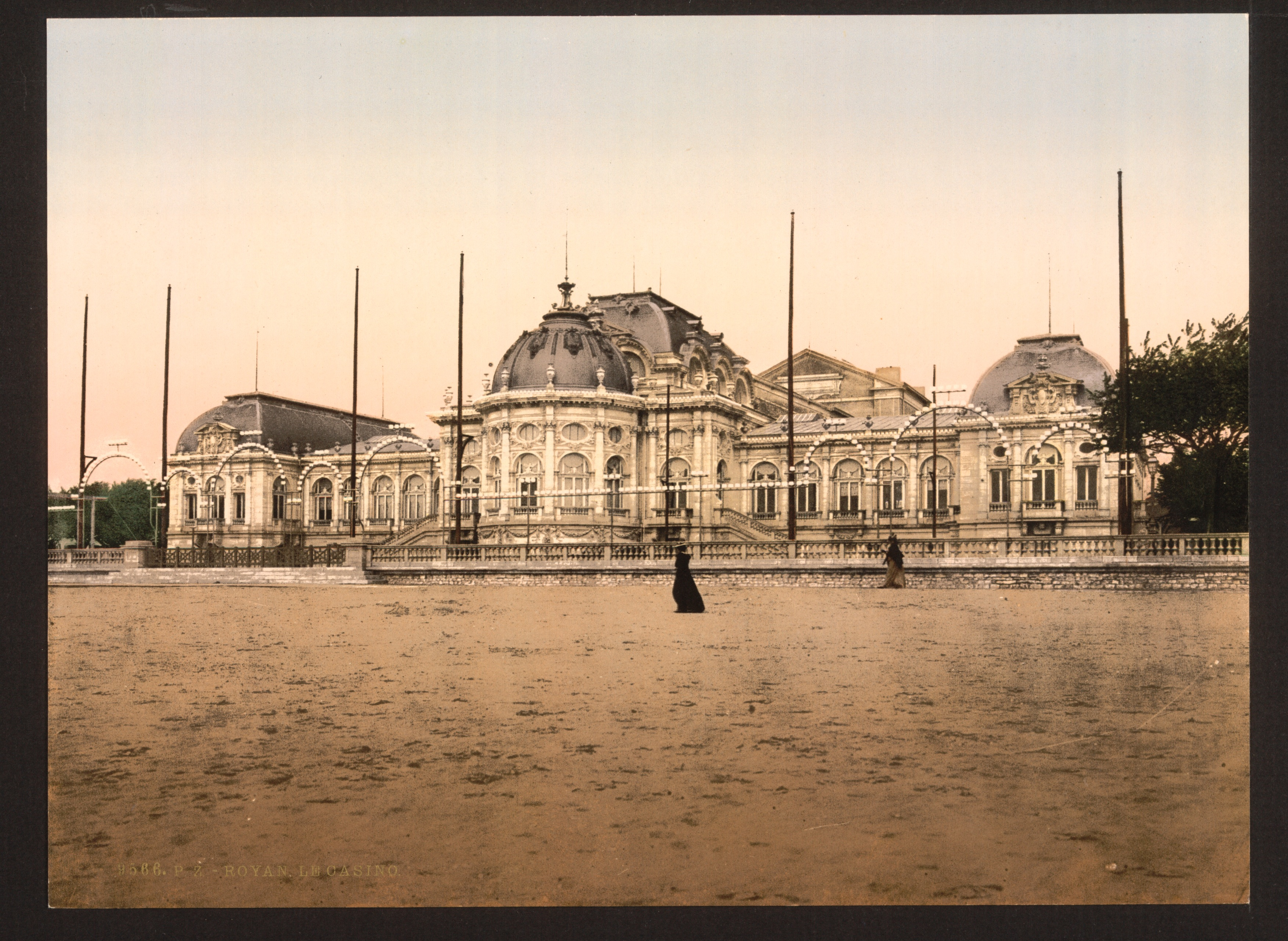
The casino in 1895, destroyed in 1945

Work to pave the town's streets began in 1816, and was finally completed in 1826. In July 1819, mayor Raymond Labarthe signed the first order regulating sea bathing. This forbade nude bathing at beaches neighbouring houses, and reserved Foncillon beach for women. In 1820, it was forbidden "to wash pigs, horses and other cattle in the sea as we have baths". In 1836, a staircase was cut out of the rock to facilitate the landing of passengers from boats. By 1845, civil engineering works by the engineer Botton incorporated the Foncillon cliff into Royan's port. In 1847, the engineer Lessore built the town's first casino. The first street lights were installed in 1854, during a time of considerable development in the town under the Second Empire (1852–1870). Between 1850 and 1870, tourist numbers increased from 9,000 to 10,000, and the population from 3,329 to 4,500.

Royan was a fashionable seaside resort in the late 19th and early 20th centuries, with magnificent boulevards. In 1922, Royan achieved the classification of "summer resort". The town welcomed many prominent guests such as Sacha Guitry, Yvonne Printemps, Mary Marquet, Jacques Henri Lartigue, and the painter Pablo Picasso.

=== Destruction ===
During World War II, two German forts defended the Gironde estuary: Gironde Mündung Nord (to the north, at Royan) and Gironde Mündung Süd (to the south, at La Pointe de Grave). These constituted one of the last pockets of Third Reich resistance along the Atlantic coast of France, well after the liberation of the rest of the country. A force of some 350 heavy bombers of the Royal Air Force (RAF) bombed Royan in two raids conducted in the early hours of 5 January 1945, destroying the town. Four Lancaster heavy bombers were shot down; no aircrew survived. Two other bombers also crashed after colliding. The raid was ordered by Supreme Headquarters Allied Expeditionary Force (SHAEF), which had been told that the only people left in Royan were Germans and collaborators. Responsibility for this raid is generally attributed to General de Larminat of the Free French Forces.

After the bombing of the French city of Royan on 5 January 1945, because of inadequate intelligence details transferred to RAF, US Air Force General Ralph Royce was removed from the European theater of operations by Supreme Allied Commander Dwight D. Eisenhower.

The Allied operation against the German forces on the island of Oléron and at the mouth of the Gironde estuary began with a general naval bombardment on 15 April 1945, some 10 months after D-Day. For five days, the American naval task force assisted the French ground forces with naval bombardment and aerial reconnaissance in the assault on Royan and the Pointe de Grave area at the mouth of the Gironde. American B-17 Flying Fortress and B-24 Liberator aircraft carried out aerial bombing missions, including extensive and pioneering use of napalm, finishing the destruction of 5 January.

The first (RAF) bombing raids on 5 January 1945 killed about 500 civilians and wounded about 1,000 for only 23 German soldiers casualties. When the US Air Force bombers returned later to Royan on 15 April 1945 (only 3 weeks before Nazi Germany surrendered) and used napalm, they destroyed the entire town for, once more, mainly French civilian casualties.

Blandford writes, "There was a Free French commander with the U.S. Seventh Army outside Royan, who was not informed until too late. The message was in French and the American signalman could not understand it. It took four hours to get it translated".

Howard Zinn, author of A People's History of the United States, was one of many bombardiers who participated in the World War II attacks on Royan. He later wrote of the bombardment.

== Royan today ==
The town was rebuilt as part of an urban development programme in the 1950s, and is representative of the Modernist architecture of the period.

== Population ==
The inhabitants of Royan are known as Royannais (male) and Royannaises (female) in French. Royan is the centre of an urban area with about 40,000 inhabitants.

Historical population

Year	Pop.	±% p.a.
1793	2,182	—
1800	2,129	−0.35%
1806	2,202	+0.56%
1821	2,339	+0.40%
1831	2,589	+1.02%
1836	2,761	+1.29%
1841	2,881	+0.85%
1846	3,106	+1.52%
1851	3,329	+1.40%
1856	3,568	+1.40%
1861	4,005	+2.34%
1866	4,170	+0.81%
1872	4,685	+1.96%
1876	5,155	+2.42%
1881	5,445	+1.10%
1886	6,702	+4.24%
1891	7,247	+1.58%
1896	8,287	+2.72%
1901	8,374	+0.21%

Year	Pop.	±% p.a.
1906	8,843	+1.10%
1911	9,330	+1.08%
1921	10,242	+0.94%
1926	10,388	+0.28%
1931	11,328	+1.75%
1936	12,192	+1.48%
1946	6,649	−5.88%
1954	12,289	+7.98%
1962	16,521	+3.77%
1968	17,292	+0.76%
1975	18,062	+0.62%
1982	17,540	−0.42%
1990	16,837	−0.51%
1999	17,102	+0.17%
2007	18,424	+0.94%
2012	17,690	−0.81%
2017	18,398	+0.79%
2023	19,425	+0.91%

Source: EHESS and INSEE (1968-2023)

== International relations ==
Royan is twinned with:

- Balingen, Baden-Württemberg, Germany
- (England) Gosport, Hampshire, United Kingdom
- Nafplion (Ναύπλιο), Peloponnese, Greece
- Annapolis Royal, Nova Scotia, Canada

== Sights ==
=== Church of Notre-Dame (église Notre-Dame) ===
Royan's 1877 neo-Gothic church, on what is now the Square Charles de Gaulle, was destroyed when Royan was bombed on January 5, 1945. After the war a new church was built, bigger, architecturally ambitious and spectacular, and drawing its aesthetic inspiration from the large Gothic cathedrals.

Notre-Dame de Royan, completed in 1958 and built entirely of reinforced concrete by architects Guillaume Gillet and Marc Hébrard and engineers Bernard Lafaille, René Sarger and Ou Tseng, is considered a masterpiece of contemporary architecture. The church took three years to build. The elliptical nave is 45 metres long by 22 metres wide (148 ft × 72 ft) and has a seating capacity for some 2000 people. It is flanked by an ambulatory, and a gallery three metres above the floor. The gallery is lit by rhombus-shaped stained glass representing the Stations of the Cross. The building's structure alternates prestressed V-shaped reinforced concrete elements made using the Lafaille process, named for its inventor, French engineer Bernard Lafaille, with huge windows, made by master glazier Henri Martin-Granel and covering a total area of 500 square metres (5,400 sq ft). The church was classified as a historical monument in 1988.

=== Convention Centre (Palais des congrès) ===
The Palais des congrès was built in 1957 by Bordeaux architect Claude Ferret. Its design is based on cubic geometry, relieved by the oblique lines of external staircases and by the subtle interweaving of convex inner walls. A glass wall opens a broad outlook onto the Gironde estuary, and the building was later extended with gardens under a transparent cube. It was classified as a historical monument in 2004.

=== Central Market (Marché central) ===
Built in 1955 by architects Louis Simon and Andre Morisseau and engineer René Sarger, the Marché central de Royan is a round concrete shell with walls 8 centimetres (3 in) thick. It rests on thirteen peripheral support-points, and has no internal pillars. The structure is 52.4 metres (171.9 ft) in diameter, with a central height of 10.5 metres (34.4 ft). It served as the model for the market in Nanterre and for the Centre of New Industries and Technologies (CNIT) in the La Défense neighbourhood of Paris.

== Education ==
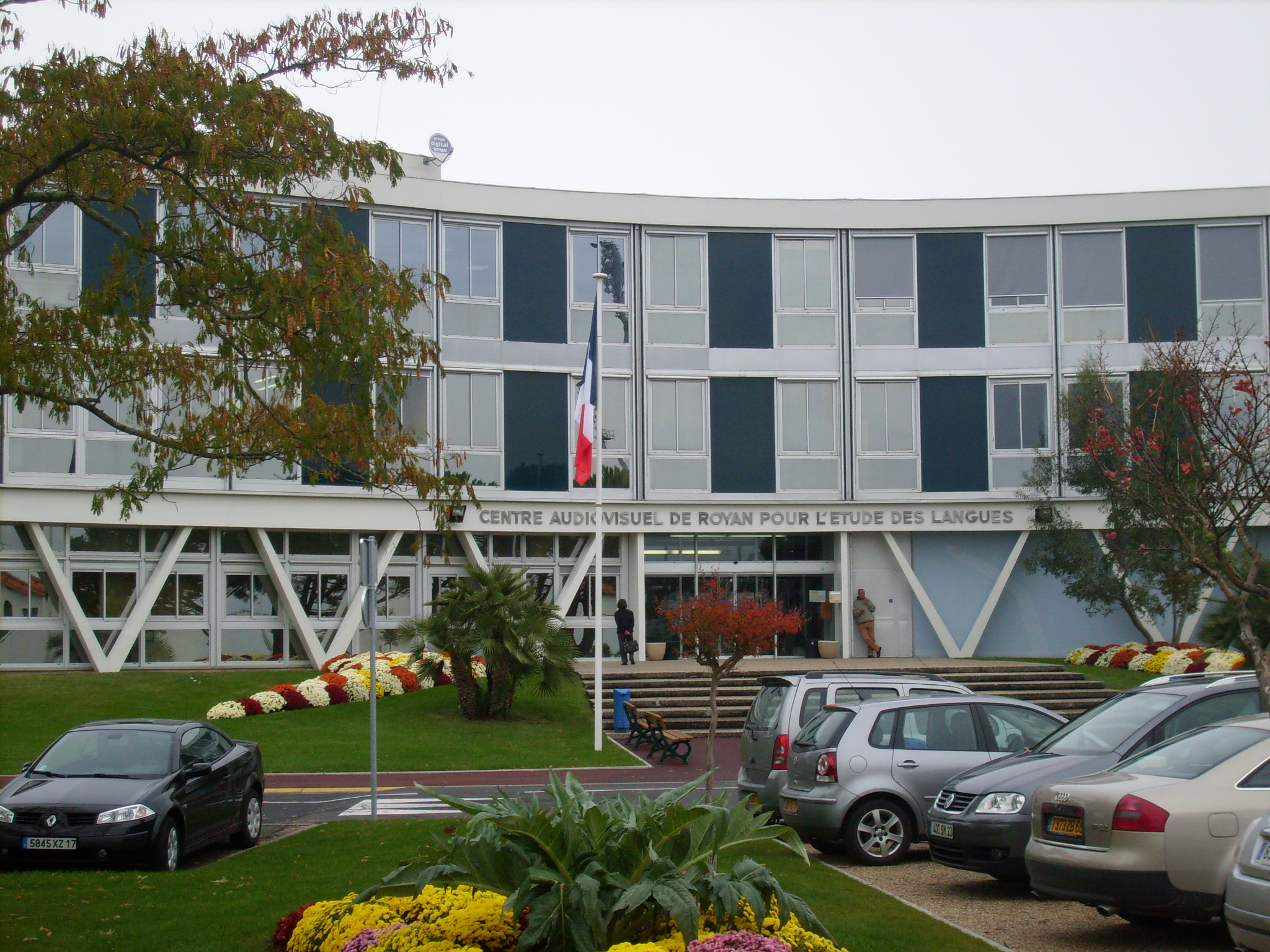
CAREL (Centre Audiovisuel de Royan pour l'Étude des Langues)

Royan has a language centre, CAREL (Centre Audiovisuel de Royan pour l'Étude des Langues). It prepares students to sit language examinations, including the Diplôme approfondi de langue française (DALF), the Diplôme d'études en langue française (DELF), the Test de connaissance du français (TCF), and the Test de français international (TFI).

Junior high schools (collèges) include the Collège Émile Zola, Collège Henry Dunant and Collège Sainte-Marie.

Senior high schools (lycées) include the Lycée de l'Atlantique and the Lycée de Cordouan.

== Sports ==
The main stadium of the city is the Stade d'honneur, near the railway station. Royan has numerous other sports facilities, including two swimming pools, of which one, at Foncillon, is an outdoor seawater pool open in the summer months; several gymnasiums; a sports hall; several tennis courts; a Basque pelota wall; a rugby ground; and a golf course.

The commune also has a surf-club, based near Pontaillac beach, and a karting circuit (KFM - Circuit of the côte de beauté).

Nearby, La Palmyre, in the commune of Les Mathes, has a racecourse, a riding school and an 18-hole golf course.

On 18–24 June 2017, the World Flying Disc Federation (WFDF) World Championships of Beach Ultimate were held in Royan.

== Notable people from Royan ==
Born in the commune of Royan:

- Hadrien David (born 2004), racing driver
- Pierre Dugua, Sieur de Mons, (c. 1558–1628), merchant, explorer and colonizer
- Marie Léopold-Lacour (1859-1942), feminist, journalist, writer
- Eugène Pelletan (1813–84), writer, journalist and politician
- Jeanne Pelisson-Mallet (1873–1961), painter

Famous residents:

- Pablo Picasso
- Leon Trotsky
- Émile Zola

== See also ==
- Communes of the Charente-Maritime department
