= Bernard Lafaille =

French engineer

- Born: 2 April 1900; Reims, France
- Died: 24 June 1955 (aged 55); Paris, France

Bernard Lafaille (2 April 1900 in Reims, France - 24 June 1955 in Paris, France) was a French engineer. He graduated from the École Centrale Paris in 1923 and was active until his death in 1955.

== Famous works ==
Some of his most famous works include:

- Church of Our Lady in Royan
- Roundabout of Hirson station
- Roundabout of Longueau station
- The French pavillon at the international Zagreb expo in 1937
- SNCF in Pantin
- Roundabout for locomotives in Avignon
- Les Gonaïves church in Haiti
- Notre-Dame-de-France church in Bizerte, Tunisia
- Notre-Dame-de-la-Paix church in Villeparisis
