= Arvert =

- Commune
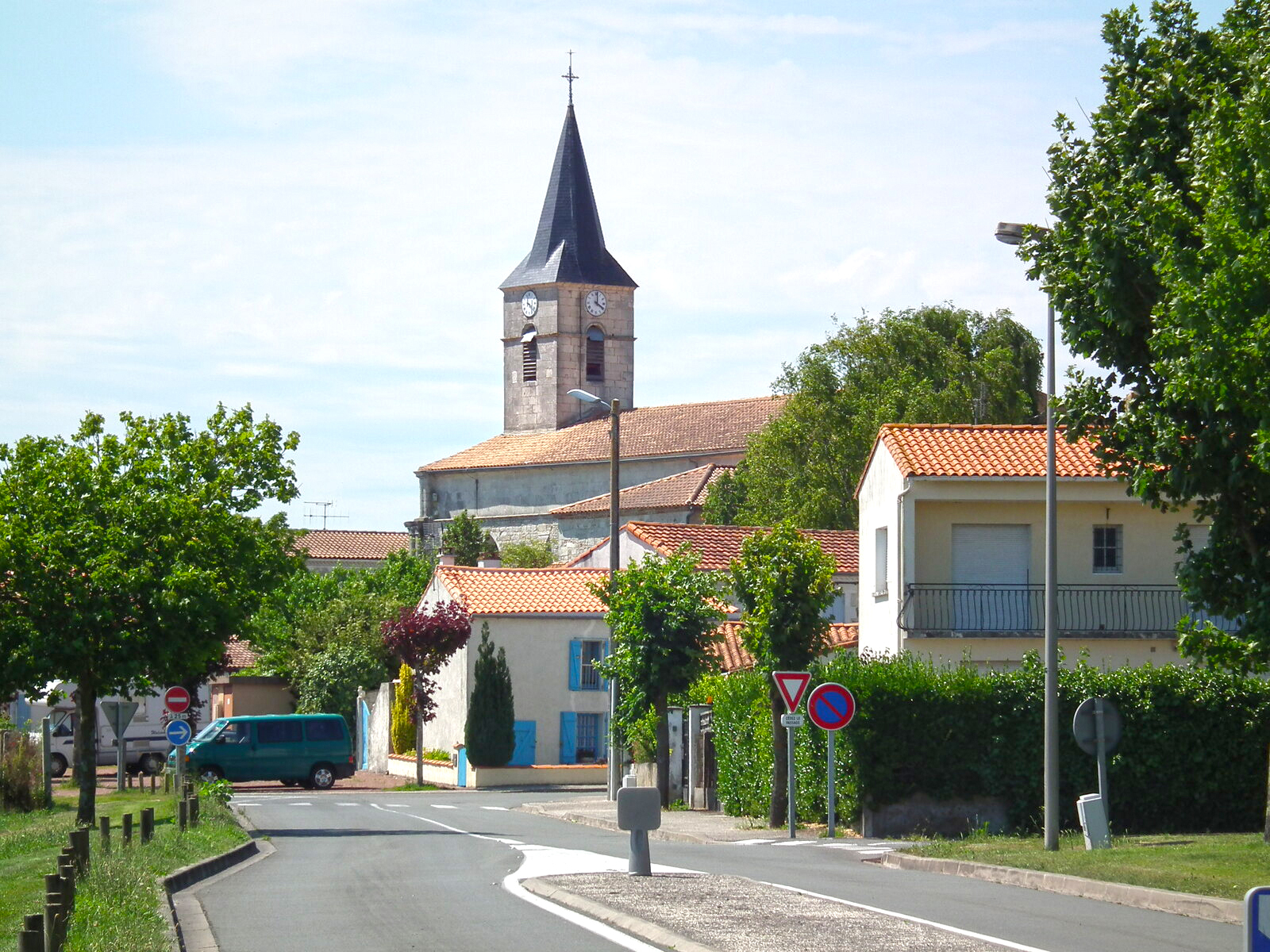
- Saint Stephen church (17th century)
- Location of Arvert
- Location within France Location within Nouvelle-Aquitaine
- Coordinates: 45°44′30″N 1°07′36″W
- Country: France
- Region: Nouvelle-Aquitaine
- Department: Charente-Maritime
- Arrondissement: Rochefort
- Canton: La Tremblade
- Intercommunality: CA Royan Atlantique

Government
  - Mayor (2020–2026): Marie-Christine Peraudeau
- Area^{1}: 26.22 km^{2} (10.12 sq mi)
- Elevation: 23 m (75 ft)
- Highest elevation: 25 m (82 ft)
- Lowest elevation: 0 m (0 ft)
- Population (2023): 3,917
  - Density: 149.4/km^{2} (386.9/sq mi)
- Time zone: UTC+01:00 (CET)
  - Summer (DST): UTC+02:00 (CEST)
- INSEE/Postal code: 17021 /17530
- ^{1} French Land Register data, which excludes lakes, ponds, glaciers > 1 km^{2} (0.386 sq mi or 247 acres) and river estuaries.

Arvert (French pronunciation: [aʁvɛʁ]) is a commune in the Charente-Maritime department and Nouvelle-Aquitaine region of south-western France.

The inhabitants of the commune are known as Alvertons or Alvertonnes.

== Geography ==
Arvert is located some 14 km north-west of Royan and 8 km south of Marennes in the heart of the Peninsula of Arvert and the Royannnais Natural Region in the continental section of the Côte de Beauté and near the famous Marennes-Oléron Oyster basin between the Seudre, Gironde, and the Atlantic Ocean. There are two oyster ports in the commune: Coux and Grève à Duret.

The commune is the centre of a conurbation comprising La Tremblade (the main urban centre), Étaules, and Chaillevette and could be considered part of the outlying "suburbs" of Royan which is the main urban centre and economic hub of the area. Administratively it is part of the canton of La Tremblade and the arrondissement of Rochefort.

Access to the commune is by the D14 main road running north-west to south-east connecting La Tremblade to Saujon and passing north-west of the town. Access to the town is by the D14E1 road from La Tremblade through the town to Étaules. The D141 also connects the town to the D14 and continues south-west to Les Mathes. The D25 starts in the commune and bypasses La Tremblade to the north and continues to Ronce-les-Bains. The D268 branches of the D25 in the commune and goes west to the beaches on the west coast.

As a significant economic and tourism centre, Arvert is located close to several large urban centres: Royan (14.7 km SE), Rochefort (30 km NE), and Saintes (38 km E). To a lesser extent, La Rochelle (47 km N) and Bordeaux (110 km SSE) are large regional cities whose influence remains strong. Arvert is also close to many small centres of lesser importance: Étaules (2 km SE) and La Tremblade (3 km NW), which form a single urban area; Breuillet (8 km SE), Marennes (10 km N), and Bourcefranc-le-Chapus (12 km N) near the island of Oléron.

Arvert with the rest of the department belongs to the Southern France area - or more specifically "South Atlantic". The commune also lies within two major geographical areas: the Grand-Ouest and the Grand South-West. Arvert has an area of 2,622 hectares consisting largely of agricultural land, forests (the edge of the Forest of la Coubre) and reclaimed land (the city centre and the main villages of Piochet, Maine-Amouroux, Dirée, Villeneuve, le Boudignon, Avallon, and the oyster ports of Coux and Grève à Duret). The eastern part of the commune directly borders the Seudre estuary and is made up of oyster farms within the famous Marennes-Oléron basin. The countryside consists of humid green meadows and extensive gray-blue mudflats (the Seudre marshes) highlighted by golden lines of reeds, hedges, and aquatic plants with, in line of sight, the Marennes steeple forming a landmark.

The commune has a low relief, being formed of a Cretaceous plateau with a slightly wavy border against the Seudre marshlands. It is partially dry (Pré des Landes is a relic of the former Gulf of Arvert which became the Barbareu Pond in the Middle Ages) drained by small rivers (Le Grand Ecours). The highest point of the commune barely exceeds 25 metres. The plateau rises to 12 metres at Martichou, 17 metres in front of the church, 20 metres at Maine-Amouroux, and 22 metres near the school.

=== Places and Hamlets ===
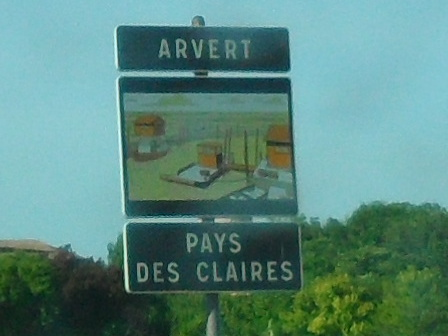
Entrance to Arvert

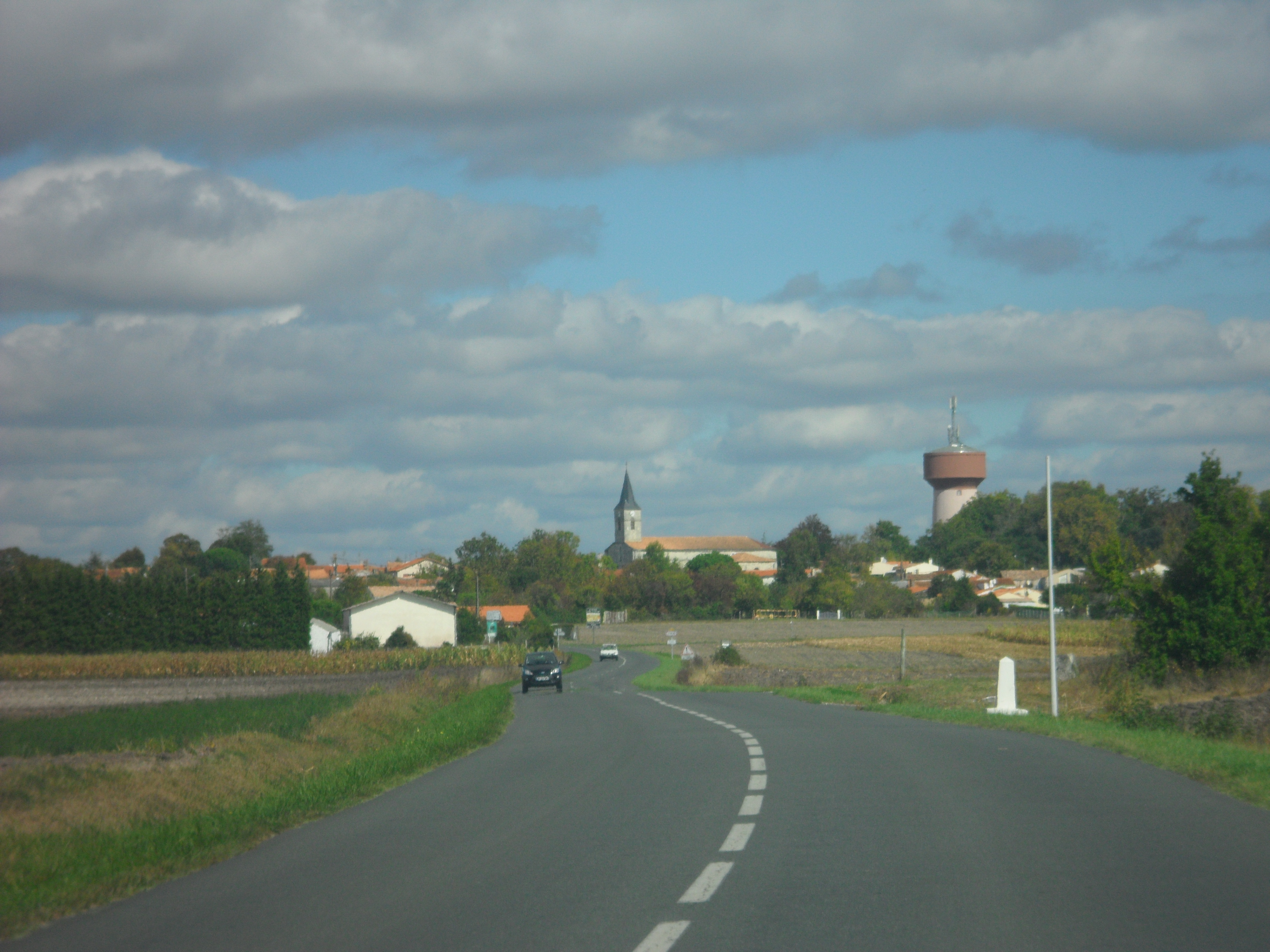
Arvert road

- Les Allains
- L'Anglade
- Arse
- Avallon
- Les Baudits
- La Beaune
- La Blague du Monde
- Blanchette
- Bois Volet
- Le Boudignon
- Les Boutinaudes
- Les Brassons
- Le Calme
- La Carolie Farm
- Cayenne
- La Champagne
- La Chapelaine
- Les Cinq Journaux
- Les Coutures
- Coux
- L'Etrade
- Fief de Bellevue
- Fief de Besse
- Le Fond d'Arse
- Les Fouilloux
- Le Fourniller
- Le Geay
- Grève à Duret
- La Guillate
- La Jument
- Les Justices
- Lerpine
- Maine
- Le Maine Amouroux
- Le Maine Gabaud
- La Metairie
- Montravail Farm
- Le Moulin Brute
- Le Moulin de Toinet
- Prise de Bremont
- Prise de Chateur Paire
- Prise de la Couronne
- Prise du Grand Jas de Coux
- Prise de la Peu Mignon
- Prise de la Roche
- Le Petit Pont
- Le Piochet
- La Pirouette
- Les Robinettes
- Les Romanes
- Savigny
- Treilebois Farm

== Transport ==
=== Bicycle paths ===
The commune has a network of bicycle paths as part of the "Pathways of Seudre" - a collaboration between the Department Council, the Agglomeration Community Royan Atlantique, and the Community of communes of the Marennes basin. The network has been operated since 2007 and allows the exploration of oyster farms and the Seudre Marsh landscape.

=== Public Transport ===
The town is served by the Cara'Bus public transport network which connects to other communes in the Royannaise agglomeration. It was inaugurated on 2 January 2006 under the name " Très Royannais" and was originally composed of hybrid minibuses (electric and diesel). It has been operated since September 2008 by the Veolia Transport company and was renamed "Cara'Bus" since then.

A modernization of the urban transport network in the agglomeration on 5 January 2009 led to the purchase of Heuliez shuttle buses as well as increasing the number of regular routes from three to ten with three additional routes in summer.

Five Cara'Bus stops are located in the commune: Maine-Giraud, Arvert-Mairie, Les Fouilloux, L'Étrade, and Le Petit Pont at the exit from the town on the border of Les Mathes and La Tremblade. Three bus routes serve the commune:

- Route 42 starts at Étaules passing all the stops in the commune and going to La Tremblade, Ronce-les-Bains, and Marennes; *Route 41 starts from Ronce-les-Bains and goes to Cozes via La Tremblade, Arvert, Étaules, Chaillevette, Breuillet (Le Magarin stop), Saint-Sulpice-de-Royan (Fontbedeau stop), Saujon, Le Chay, and Grézac;
- Route 22 connects Ronce-les-Bains to the Royan multimodal railway station via La Tremblade, Arvert, Étaules, Chaillevette, Breuillet (Centre-Ville), Vaux-sur-Mer (Val Lumière shopping centre), and Royan.

The commune is also served by the Les Mouettes departmental transport company, more specifically by the routes 409, 410, and 411 which connect Breuillet to Bourcefranc-le-Chapus via Étaules, La Tremblade, and Marennes. This service links to the main cities of the department.

=== Air transport ===
The nearest airport is that of Rochefort Saint-Agnant, about 25 kilometres north. The La Rochelle – Île de Ré Airport, 50 kilometres north, has services to some major French cities such as Paris and Lyon as well as the British Isles and Northern Europe. About 100 kilometres south-east of the commune, Bordeaux - Merignac Airport is an international airport with connections to many countries.

The Royan – Médis Aerodrome, about 17 kilometres south-east, is reserved for light aviation.

== Toponymy ==
The name Arvert comes from the Latin artum meaning a "narrow place" and viride meaning "green".

== History ==
Arvert has been inhabited since Neolithic times, the site of the present commune of Arvert was formerly limited to a narrow strip of land between two ocean bays. Although a first village appeared in Roman times, it was only from the 12th century that it grew in importance and a monastic community was established built using a grant from the Lord of Mornac.

Shortly afterwards Arvert became an independent lordship with many parishes under its jurisdiction: those of Trembledam (now La Tremblade), Notre-Dame de l'Isle (now Étaules), Chaillevette, Les Mathes, and the parish of La Roche which no longer exists.

In 1534 Calvin made speeches at Angoulême and Poitiers that young Saintonge monks from heard. Reform was soon preached in all of the Arvert peninsula and by 1550 the majority of the population was Protestant. In 1546 and again in 1553 a total of three monks were condemned to the stake for having preached reform in Arvert.

In 1568 the church was burned and almost completely destroyed. In the same year the first Protestant church was built in the village.

In 1598 the Edict of Nantes was promulgated. All means were tried to convert the Protestants. In 1644 the Protestant denomination was prohibited in Arvert.

In 1682 King Louis XIV ordered the destruction of the Protestant church. The revocation of the Edict of Nantes in 1685 accelerated the exodus of Protestants from the peninsula despite the ban on leaving France imposed on them. Fugitives were arrested and sent to the galleys. On 21 February 1687 three boats loaded with fugitives leaving Mornac, Chaillevette, and La Tremblade were immobilized by soldiers on the Seudre.

Despite the arrests, the peninsula was emptied of its people. Those who remained created an underground church they called the Church of the Desert. Clandestine meetings were held in the dunes, woods, or in barns. Jean-Louis Gibert, pastor of the Desert, fitted out the barns as "Houses of Prayer" from 1751. There were two near Arvert: one at Avallon and one at Chaillevette. In 1754 the pastor was sentenced to death and went into exile in America.

Arvert was a barony under the ancien régime, belonging to Cardinal Richelieu before moving to the Senectère family. In 1790 Arvert was made into a commune. Shortly after a quarrel erupted between the representatives of the communes of La Tremblade and Arvert: each trying to become the capital of the canton. For economic reasons it was La Tremblade who finally obtained that privilege.

Occupied by German troops during the Second World War, the village was the scene of heavy fighting during the liberation of the Royan pocket in April 1945.

== Policy and Administration ==
=== Municipal administration ===
From 1789 to 1799, under the Act of 14 December 1789, the municipal agents (equivalent to mayors) were directly elected for 2 years and re-elected by the working citizens of the town aged 25 years or more who paid a tax of at least 3 days of work in the commune. Those who were eligible paid a tax equivalent to at least ten working days.

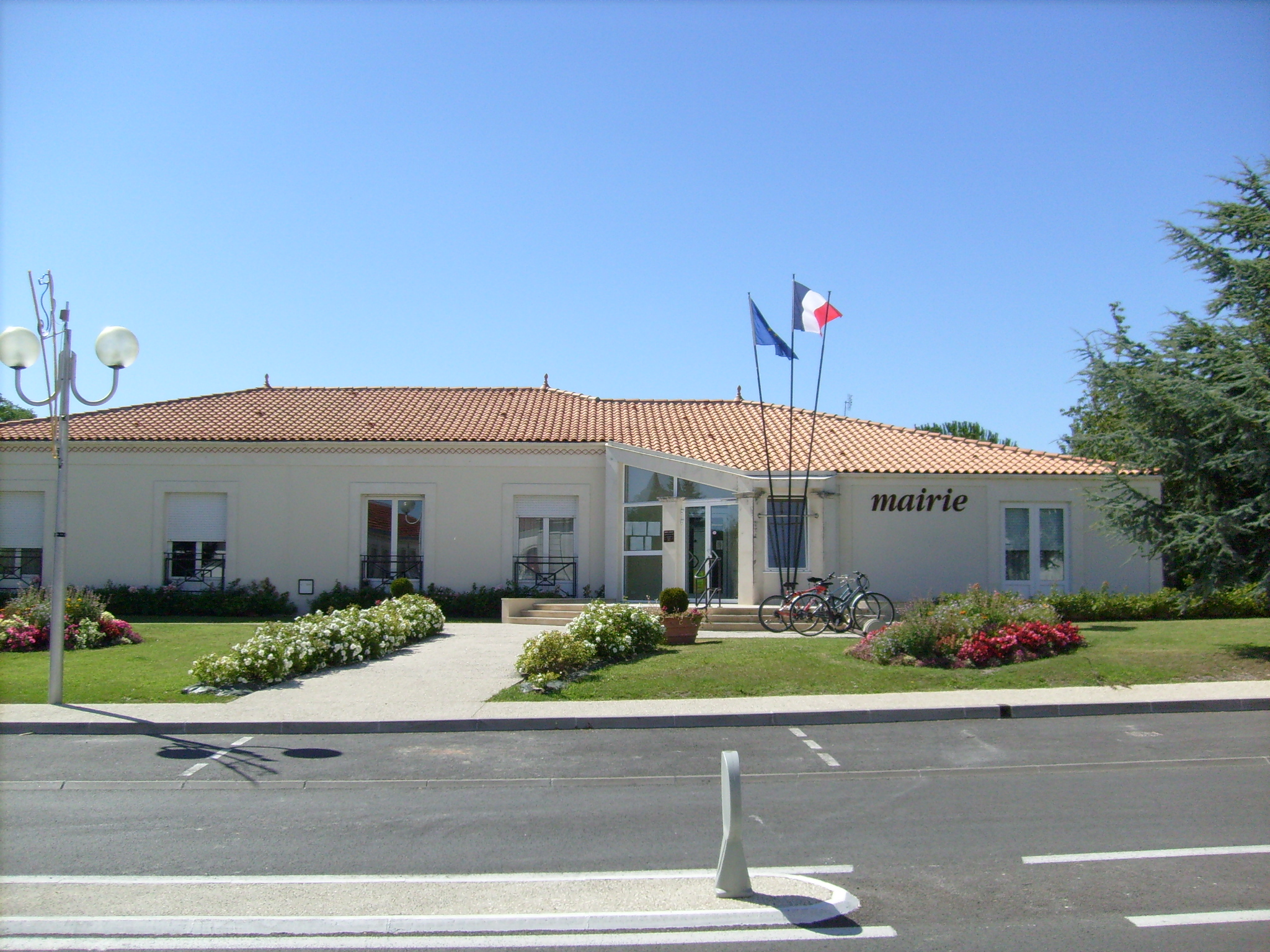
The new Town Hall in the centre of town

From 1799 to 1848, under the constitution of 22 Frimaire Year VIII (13 December 1799), mayors were appointed by the prefect for communes with less than 5,000 inhabitants. The Restoration established the appointment of mayors and councillors. After the 1831 organic law mayors were appointed (by the king for communes with more than 3,000 inhabitants, by the prefect for smaller) but councillors were elected by censal suffrage for six years.

From 3 July 1848 to 1851 mayors were elected by the municipal council for communes with fewer than 6,000 inhabitants.

From 1851 to 1871 mayors were appointed by the prefect for communes with less than 3,000 inhabitants and for 5 years from 1855. After 1871 mayors were elected again except in the capital towns (of departments, arrondissements, or cantons).

It was on 28 March 1882 that the current law on municipal organization was passed which governed the principle of election of the mayor and the deputy by the council whatever the size of the commune (except for Paris). The law of 5 April 1884 fixed the term to four years, a duration increased to six years on 10 April 1929.

According to its size, the commune has a council of 23 members (Article L2121-2 of the General Code of local authorities).

== List of Successive Mayors ==
From	To	Name	Party
1989	2001	René Morillon	PCF
2001	2020	Michel Priouzeau	DVG
2020	2026	Marie-Christine Peraudeau	

=== Canton ===
Arvert is one of the six communes in the Canton of La Tremblade. In 2010 it was the second most populous town behind La Tremblade and above Étaules.

=== Inter-communality ===
Arvert is one of 34 communes adhering to the Urban Community of Royan Atlantique which includes the communes in the greater periphery of Royan.

=== Courts ===
Arvert depends on the Tribunal d'instance (district court) and the Conseil de prud'hommes (Labour Court) of Rochefort; the Tribunal de grande instance (High Court), the Tribunal pour enfants (Juvenile court), and the Tribunal de commerce (Commercial Court) of La Rochelle; the Tribunal administratif (Administrative Court) and the Cour d'appel ( Court of Appeal) of Poitiers. The Cour administrative d'appel (Administrative Court of Appeal) is in Bordeaux.

=== Local taxation ===
The taxation of households and businesses in Arvert in 2010
Taxe	Communal part	Inter-communal part	Departmental part	Regional part
Dwelling Tax (TH)	10.48%	0.00%	7.12%	0.00%
Land value tax on built properties (TFPB)	18.01%	0.00%	14.01%	3.32%
Land value tax on vacant land (TFPNB)	37.69%	0.00%	29.17%	8.63%
Business Tax (CFE)	0.00%	22.54%	0.00%	0.00%

A regional share of the Dwelling tax is not applicable.

Professional tax was replaced in 2010 by the Land premium for companies (CFE) on the rental value of their property and the value added contribution of the business sector (CAVE) (the two forming the Territorial Economic Contribution (CET) which is a local tax introduced by the Finance Act 2010).

== Population and Society ==
=== Demography ===
Historical population

Year	Pop.	±% p.a.
1793	2,650	—
1800	2,717	+0.36%
1806	2,496	−1.40%
1821	2,425	−0.19%
1831	2,402	−0.10%
1836	2,360	−0.35%
1841	2,432	+0.60%
1846	2,430	−0.02%
1851	2,539	+0.88%
1856	2,620	+0.63%
1861	2,627	+0.05%
1866	2,773	+1.09%
1872	2,483	−1.82%
1876	2,443	−0.41%
1881	2,532	+0.72%
1886	2,496	−0.29%
1891	2,571	+0.59%
1896	2,485	−0.68%
1901	2,494	+0.07%

Year	Pop.	±% p.a.
1906	2,334	−1.32%
1911	2,323	−0.09%
1921	2,036	−1.31%
1926	1,957	−0.79%
1931	1,926	−0.32%
1936	2,071	+1.46%
1946	2,028	−0.21%
1954	2,003	−0.15%
1962	2,155	+0.92%
1968	2,183	+0.22%
1975	2,380	+1.24%
1982	2,541	+0.94%
1990	2,734	+0.92%
1999	2,887	+0.61%
2007	3,069	+0.77%
2012	3,259	+1.21%
2017	3,448	+1.13%
2023	3,917	+2.15%

Source: EHESS and INSEE

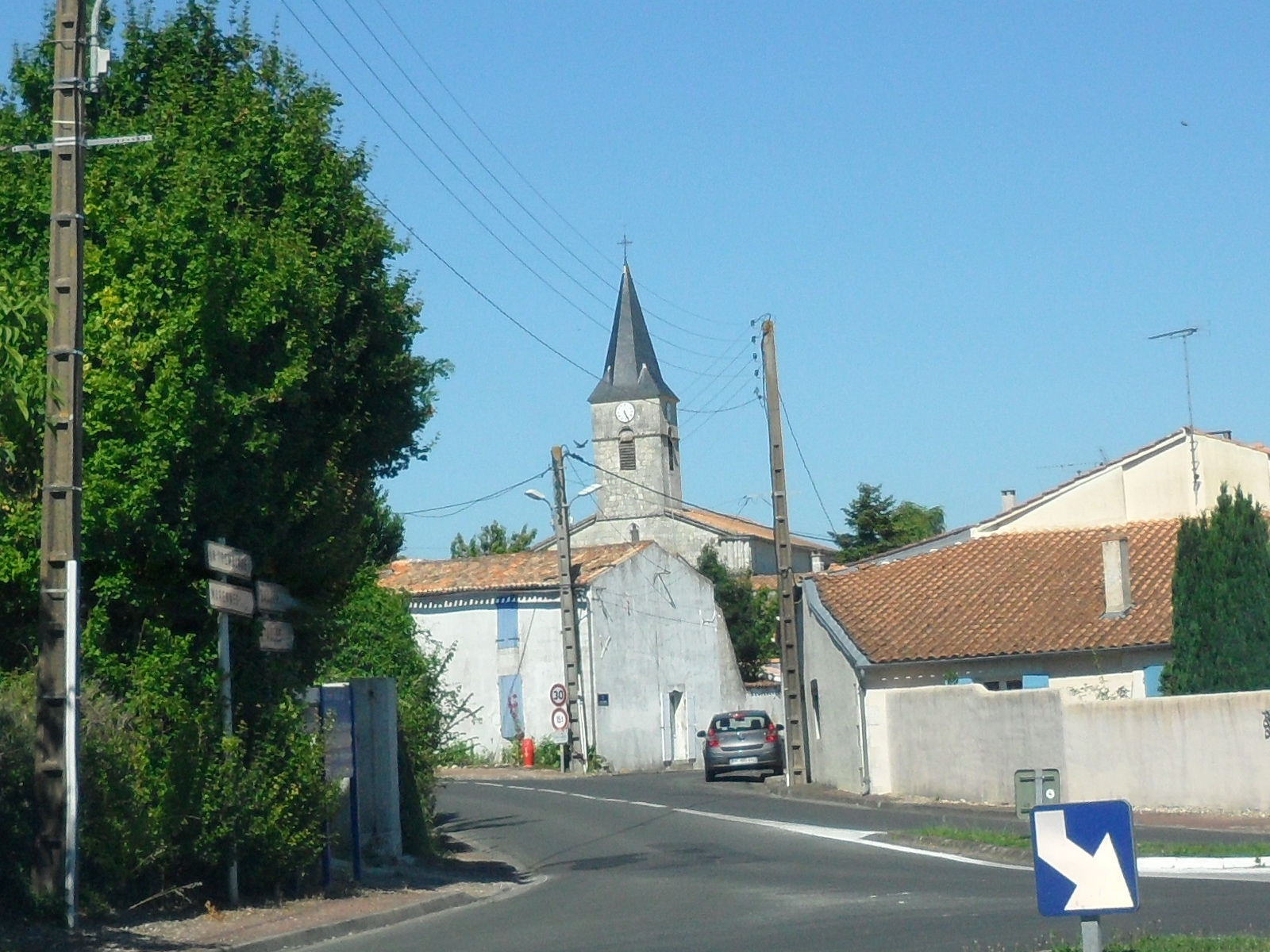
Arvert Town Centre

=== Education ===
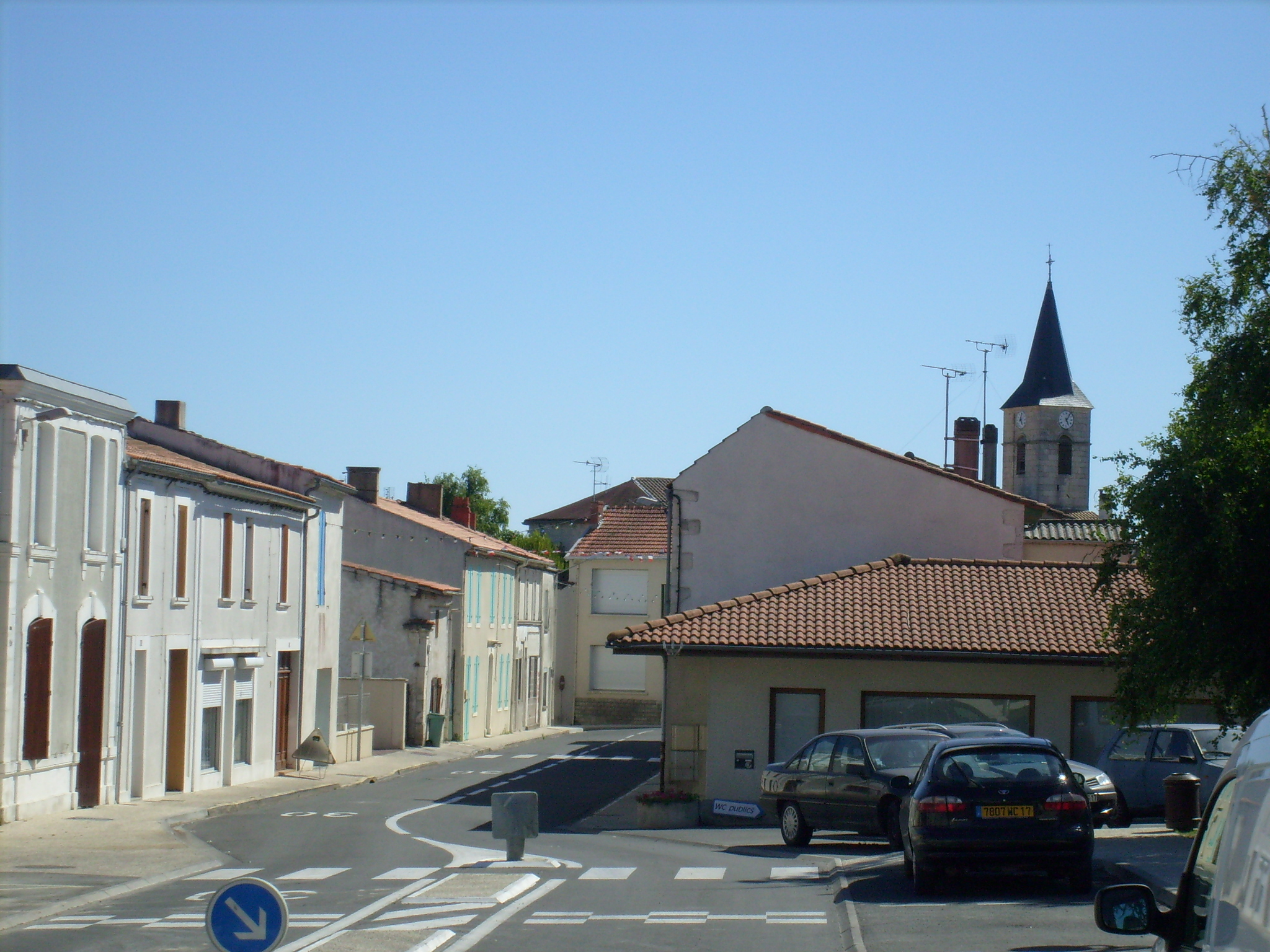
Street in Arvert

Arvert depends on the Academy of Poitiers. The town has a kindergarten (small, medium, and large section) and an elementary school. Both schools have a school restaurant (self-service for students from the CP).

Youth policy is set across the Canton of La Tremblade. It is managed by a SIVOM (Syndicat intercommunal à vocations multiples) and aims to accommodate children outside school times. It consists of three divisions: infants, children (3–12 years), and youths (13–18 years). Three Nursery schools are open to children of the canton: "La Farandole" and "Pirouettes Cacahuètes" in Arvert town centre, and "Les petites goules" at La Tremblade.

The cantonal leisure centre is located in the commune and is open to children from 3 years old. It is a Summer camp without accommodation offering crafts, expression workshops, games, and activities (tree climbing, swimming, horseback riding, etc.). Mini-camps are organized during the summer. Finally, the "Maison de La Treille" at La Tremblade is open to youths aged 13 to 18 years. It offers sports activities, workshops, and outings (surfing, paintball, diving, etc.). It also offers a room with video games and internet access. Young people can also submit their own projects.

=== Health and Safety ===
The town has a general practice medical centre, two nursing centres, a physiotherapist, and a pharmacy. The nearby towns of La Tremblade, Étaules, and Royan offer a wider range of care with the presence of numerous specialists, a hospital with an emergency department, and two private clinics in Royan.

Security of property and people is ensured by the municipal police and the Police station at La Tremblade. The town also hosts a rescue centre with firemen.

=== Sports ===
The commune has many sports facilities in addition to those already present in the other communes of the agglomeration (La Tremblade, Étaules, and Chaillevette). The Valentin Guillon stadium is located close to the city centre and can accommodate 2,100 spectators (122 in the stands). It consists of two grass football pitches where the home team trains (Arvert Peninsula Football Club), a running track, and an area for jumping and throwing.

The town also has an indoor arena (indoor tennis, handball and basketball), two tennis courts, and a leisure park with a multi-sports area for teenagers, a petanque court, and a playground for children. Four hiking trails (walking or cycling) are available in the commune.

=== Media ===
==== Television ====
The transmitters at Royan-Vaux-sur-Mer and Niort-Maisonnay allow the reception of 18 free channels of Digital terrestrial television (TNT) across the whole commune including the local France 3 Poitou-Charentes station. On 31 May 2009, the high-power transmitter was among the first to broadcast a new multiplex which allowed the reception of the first transmissions of High-definition television (HD).

==== Radio ====
Most national radio stations present in the department can be heard in the commune. Departmental information is relayed by public radio station France Bleu La Rochelle. The local radio stations that can be heard in the commune are mainly:

- Vogue Radio (a local radio station of the commune whose studios are in the city centre and which is transmitted throughout the peninsula including Royan),
- Demoiselle FM (general broadcasting from Rochefort with studios in Saint-Georges-de-Didonne)
- Terre Marine FM (general broadcasting from Fouras)
- Mixx radio (techno, dance, and electronic music broadcasting from Cognac and retransmitted by the Saintes transmitter)
- RCF Accords Charente-Maritime (religious broadcasting from La Rochelle).

Wit FM (general broadcasting from Bordeaux) can sometimes be heard but randomly depending on weather conditions.

==== Press ====
Local press is represented by the daily Sud Ouest, headquartered in Bordeaux, which has a local edition from Royan.

==== Broadband Internet ====
A Main distribution frame is located in the commune. In 2013, it is unbundled by several alternative operators (SFR, Free, and Bouygues Telecom) in addition to the incumbent operator, Orange. ADSL, ADSL2+, Re-ADSL 2, and ADSL television are available in the commune.

=== Worship ===
Arvert belongs to the Roman Catholic Diocese of La Rochelle and Saintes which has been a sub-division of the Ecclesiastical province of Poitiers since 2002 (Ecclesiastical Province of Bordeaux before that date) and the Deanery of Marennes-Oléron. The parish is included in the Parish of the Arvert Peninsula centred on Marennes. Mass is celebrated every Saturday evening at 6:30 p.m. in the church of Saint-Étienne.

Arvert houses a Church of the Reformed Church where there are services on some Sundays at 10:30am, alternating between La Tremblade, Marennes, Étaules, and Chaillevette.

Other religions do not have a place of worship in the town.

=== Market ===
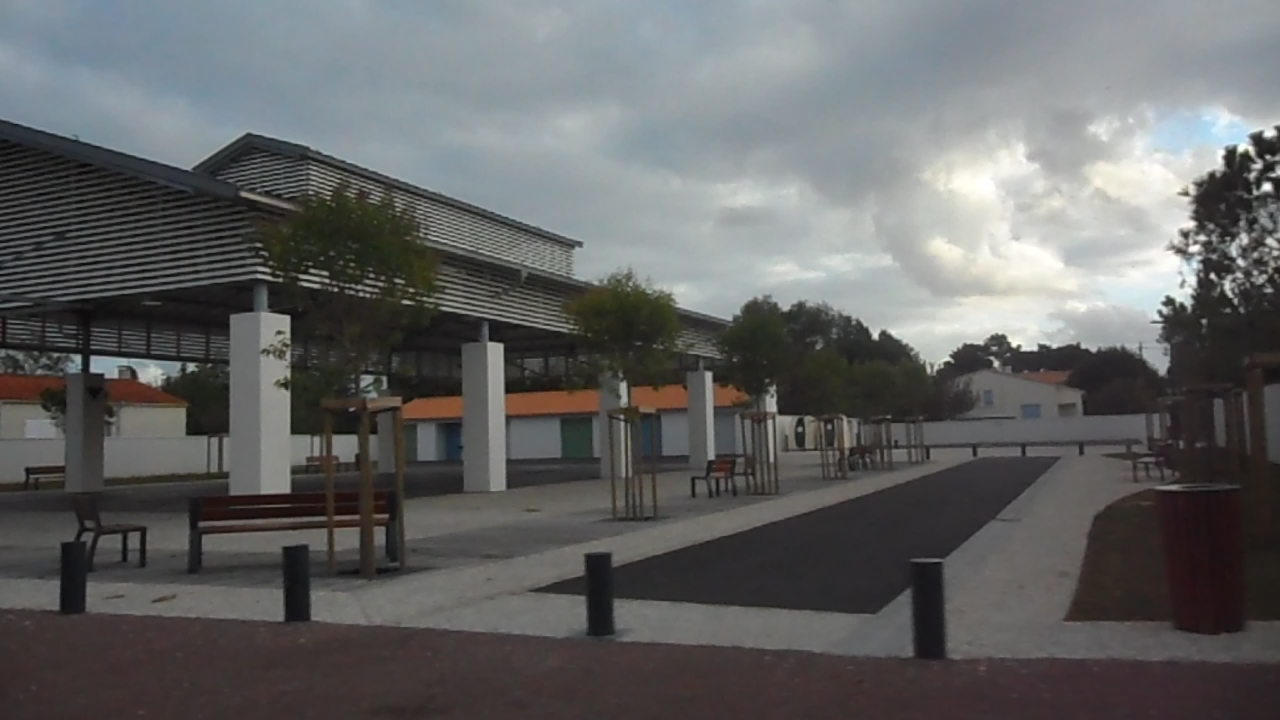
Arvert Market Hall

A food market is held every Wednesday and Saturday morning (from 8:00am to 12:30pm) on the Market Square in the city centre. It brings together twice a week ten producers (fishmongers, butchers, vegetable sellers, etc.). The restructuring of the market place, initiated in the early 2010s, resulted in the construction of modern halls with simple lines and openwork. It was opened on 1 June 2011.

== Economy ==
=== Employment ===
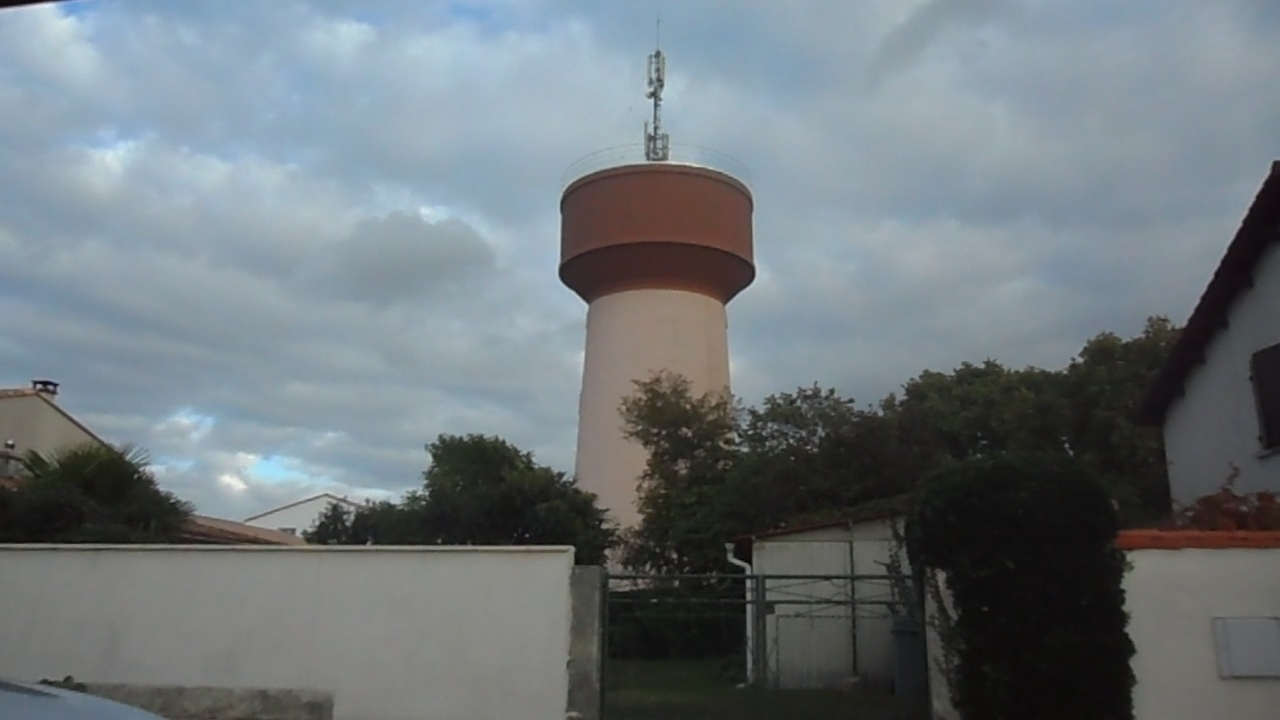
The Water Tower

The unemployment rate in the commune is higher than the national average. It was 14.9% in 1999 (national average 12.9%), 12.8% in 2006 (national average 9.8%) and 14.8% in 2017 (national average: 13.4%).

An "Employment point" was set up in 1992 at La Tremblade to attempt to regulate this problem and helping people adapt to changes in the labour market. Working in partnership with the Employment office of Pays Royannais, the Employment centre of Royan, seasonal workers office, and the local Pays Royonais, it provides access to job offers, helps with some tasks (e.g. resume writing, preparing for job interviews) and participates in collective briefings.

=== Businesses and shops ===
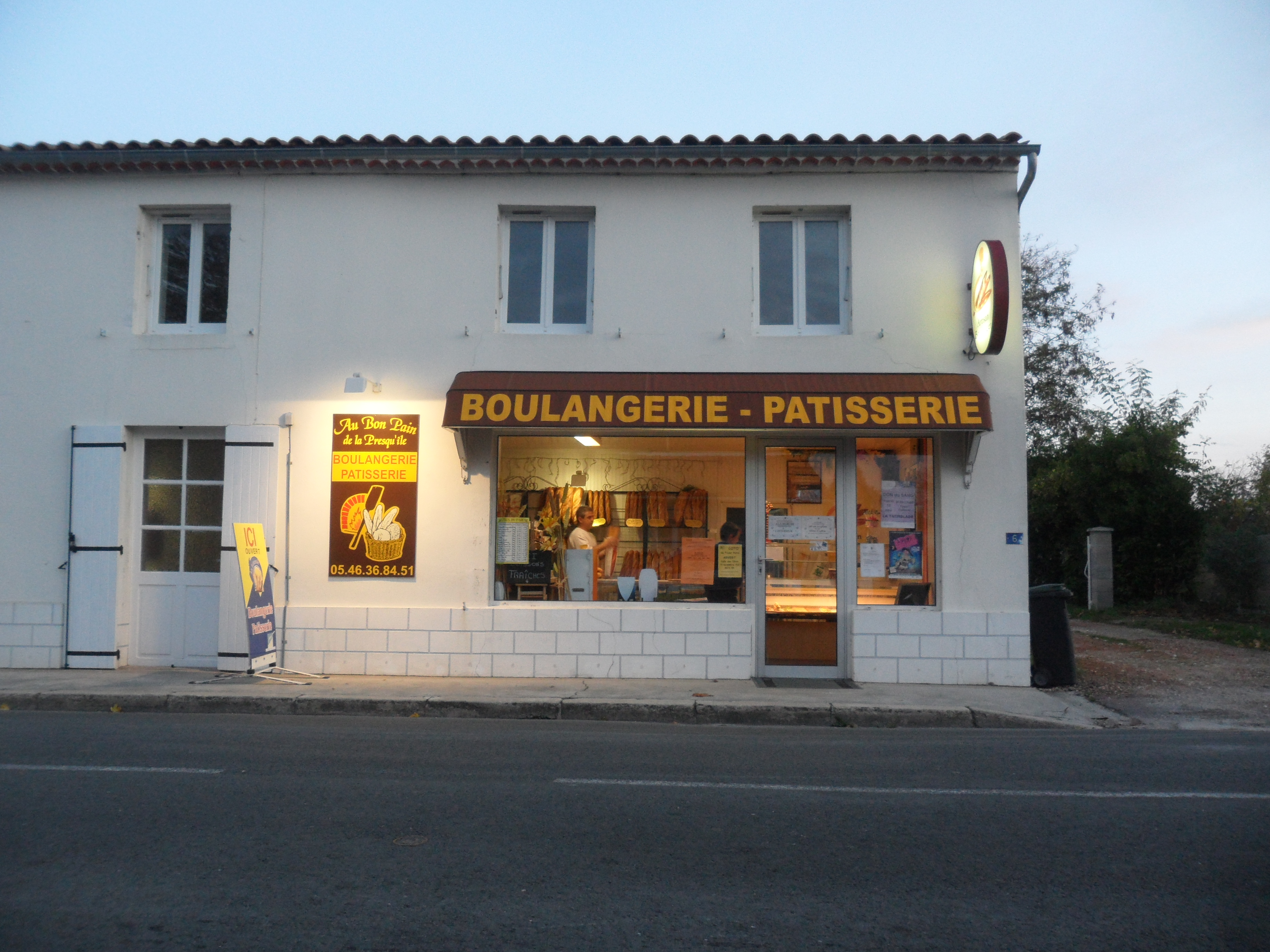
One boulangerie (bakery)

The commune is at the centre of an attractive labour pool: the employment zone of Royan (coming from the partition of the former employment zone of Saintonge maritime, which included many communes of Pays Rochefortais, Pays Marennes-Oleron and Pays Royannais), with 27,753 jobs in 2008. The Employment zone of Royan is, with that of La Rochelle, the most dynamic region in Poitou-Charentes with both enjoying "an economic fabric and a dynamic demography" (INSEE). Growth is particularly strong due to the development of tertiary activities.

307 establishments were identified in the commune by INSEE on 31 December 2015 - mostly very small businesses: 73 with from 1-9 employees and only 14 over 10 employees. The sectors of oyster farming and agriculture remain important in the community, the two of them having 12.8% of employees. Thirty oyster farms are located in Arvert, mostly in the two ports of Coux and Grève à Duret who operate all the production, refining, and shipping of oysters from the Marennes-Oléron basin.

Trades and services are booming as a consequence of the development of the area and the benefits of tourism which does not only concern the coastal communities. The proximity of resorts on the Côte de Beauté (and also Ronce-les-Bains) and a pine forest on the outskirts of the town (Forest of la Coubre) account for a growing increase in tourism which has helped in the establishment of appropriate infrastructure (three campsites, one holiday village) and a tourist office in the city centre. In late 2015, commerce, services (for people and business), and tourism together employed 31.5% of the work force. The construction sector, which is in fourth place, employs 4.3%. Public administration, education, health, and social welfare employ 49.3% of the workforce and Industry, which is only slightly represented in the commune, only employs barely 2.1% of the work force.

The commune has many shops that complement those already present in the neighbouring communes of La Tremblade and Étaules: these three towns form a single entity closely linked at the macro-economic level. The shops are concentrated in the town centre, along the road to La Tremblade but also in the commercial zone of Justices near the ring road. The town centre has a supermarket (Carrefour City) nearby and is surrounded by a small mall with a petrol station, an ALDI hard-discount store, two bakeries, a library/newsagent, a driving school, two estate agents, two hardware stores, a fast food outlet, several restaurants, a second-hand shop, a funeral home, a computer store, and two hair salons. At the exit from the town there is a Super U hypermarket (2,985 square metres of sales area) which replaced a smaller store. Its construction began in the autumn of 2013 and lasted until the spring of 2014. The mall opened on 24 April 2014. A few hundred yards away, but in the commune of La Tremblade, is an Intermarché supermarket.

The nearest major shopping area are in the Royannaise Agglomeration (CC Val Lumière and Hyper Intermarché in Vaux-sur-Mer and CC Royan II and E. Leclerc in Royan).

== Culture and heritage ==
=== Sites and Monuments ===
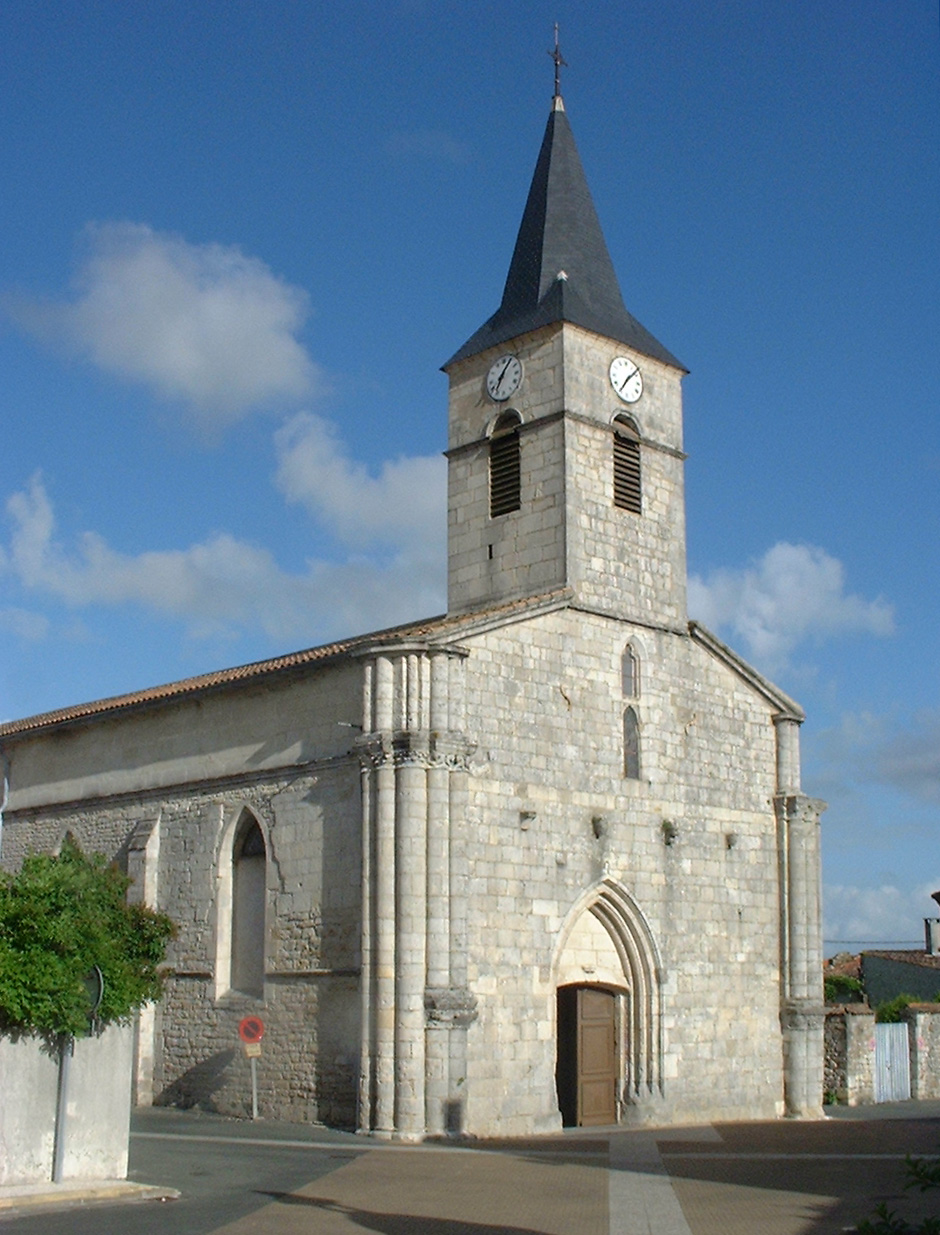
The Church of Saint Stephen

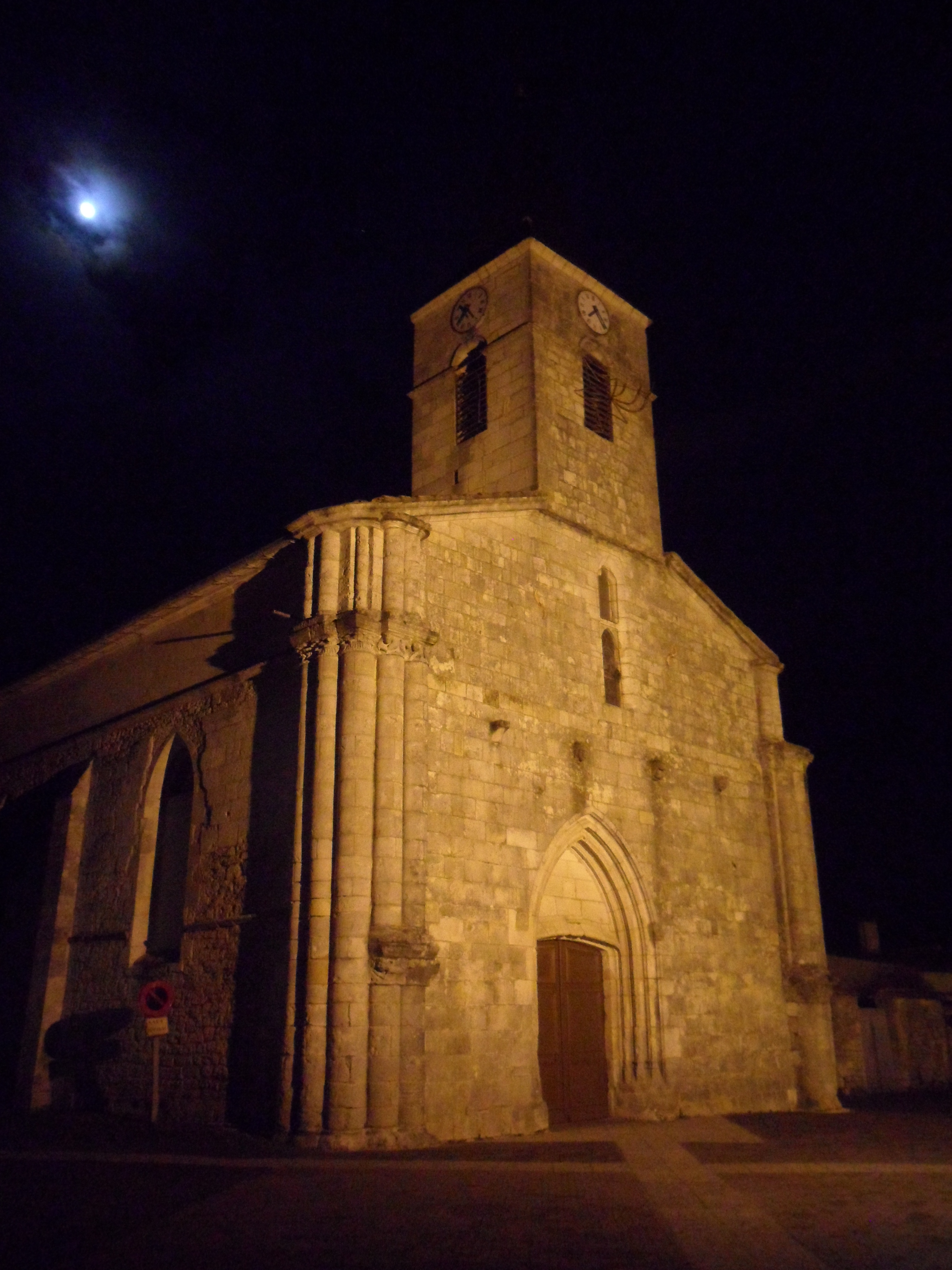
The church at night

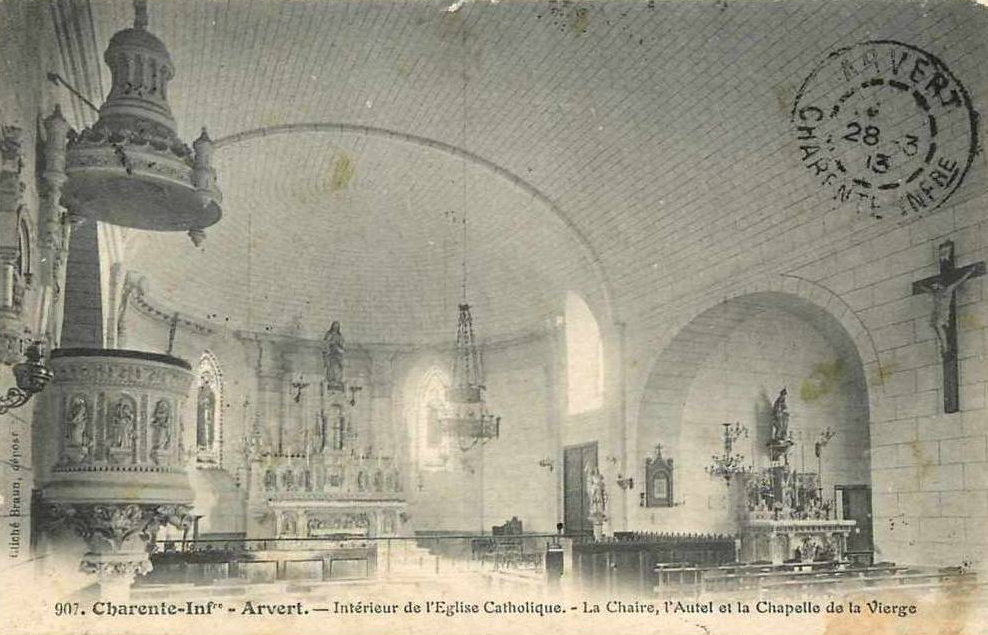
Church interior

Church of Saint-Étienne

Saint-Étienne church has very old foundations and suffered greatly during the French Wars of Religion. In 1568 the old Romanesque church was attacked by the Huguenots which almost completely destroyed it - as was the church of Saint-Symphorien de Dirée (which was never rebuilt).

The facade retains some architectural elements dating from the 12th century: two beams of seven columns surmounted by capitals and some corbels. All testify to the fantasy and humour deployed by medieval workmen. One of the capitals shows a character vomiting a snake that turns on him and bites his cheek; another shows a man's head, who appears to be a pirate or a Viking looking towards the old Gulf of Arvert.

The present church dates from 1683 (the date is on one of the buttresses in the choir), making it the oldest in the Canton of La Tremblade. It owes its reconstruction to Father Jean de Lafargue, parish priest from 1672 to 1717. Changes were made to the building in the 19th century: primarily the construction of the bell tower (1845) - a solid stone tower with a slate spire, the increase in the height of the walls, the addition of small chapels (false transept), and an enlargement of the choir (1890). The church, which is very plain, consists of a large nave covered with a plastered vault lowered and lit by a series of bays which are sometimes ogival and sometimes semicircular where stained glass windows were placed in the taste of the 19th century. In the choir, two windows represent Saint Stephen and Saint Paul. A stone pulpit is placed near the north chapel. The bell tower features a set of three bells: "Marie-Émilie" (A flat, 450 kg), "Frances, Stephanie, Josephus, Jeanne" (B flat, 310 kg) and "Mary, Martha, Leon, Eustelle" (D, 230 kg). The front of the church has a domed well from the 18th century.

Protestant church

The Reformation was implanted early in the Arvert peninsula which was open to the sea and consequently to the region and new ideas from maritime hawkers and traders from northern European countries. The Protestant population was large enough for a first church to be built in 1566 along the path connecting Arvert to Les Mathes. It became too small, too outdated, or perhaps simply not corresponding to the needs of worship, it was replaced by a new building in 1609. At times threatened with destruction, it maintained its function by an order of 28 February 1664.

The pressure on the Protestant community become more intense. Pressed to give up their "mistakes", the Protestants were denied their place of worship by an edict of the Conseil du Roi (King's council) on 2 March 1682. The building was completely destroyed including the foundations. The materials used to restore the Church of Saint-Étienne. With no building available, worship was then celebrated in private houses or in the open air, until that practice was specifically prohibited by an edict of King Louis XIV dated 23 March 1683.

In 1685 the Edict of Fontainebleau, which revoked the Edict of Nantes, for more than a century forced Protestants in the region to a semi-clandestine existence and sometimes into exile. In 1755 a prayer house was built in Avallon. It was not until 1834 that the commune acquired a large property, purchased from the heirs of Martin Descombes: while the commune sold the gardens at auction, the Protestant consistory bought materials to build the new church from the year 1836. It was restored several times - in 1885, 1897, and 1902 (purchase of new furniture) and was subject to a true "makeover" in 1903 (restoration of the roof of the structure, the frames, etc.) and in 2000. Very plain from an architectural perspective, it forms a simple rectangular room lit by arched windows.

Avallon House of prayer

In the second half of the 18th century and under the influence of Enlightenment ideas and thanks to the tenacity of pastors such as Louis Gibert, a series of prayer houses (churches fitted in barns and private houses) were built around Royan. Persecution against the Protestants, always a reality, dropped in intensity thanks to the protection of the Marquis de Sénecterre, Marshal of France and Governor of Saintonge.

The first house of prayer was built in 1755 at Breuillet: if it was burned by court order, it was immediately rebuilt. In a few weeks, other places of worship appeared. The sale of a plot of land at Avallon (a small port then located a short distance from the town) by Martine Pasdejeu allowed the construction of a first house of prayer and the benefactor was sentenced to detention in the hospice of La Rochelle. The place of prayer was demolished but was rebuilt at the earliest opportunity. It has some importance because in 1781 it housed the Synod of the Churches of Saintonge, Angoumois, and Bordeaux. Due to many maintenance problems, however, it was decided to build a modern temple in 1834.

The Avallon house of prayer Avallon was far from the town centre yet continued to be used and even restored the same year (dedication was made on 20 April 1834). It was sold in 1955 and is now part of a private property. It is one of the few houses of prayer still standing - a testimony to this type of construction in Charente-Maritime with the Maine-Geoffroy Church at Royan and the former house of prayer at Luzac (the one of Paterre at Chaillevette has unfortunately been completely destroyed).

The Mill at Justices

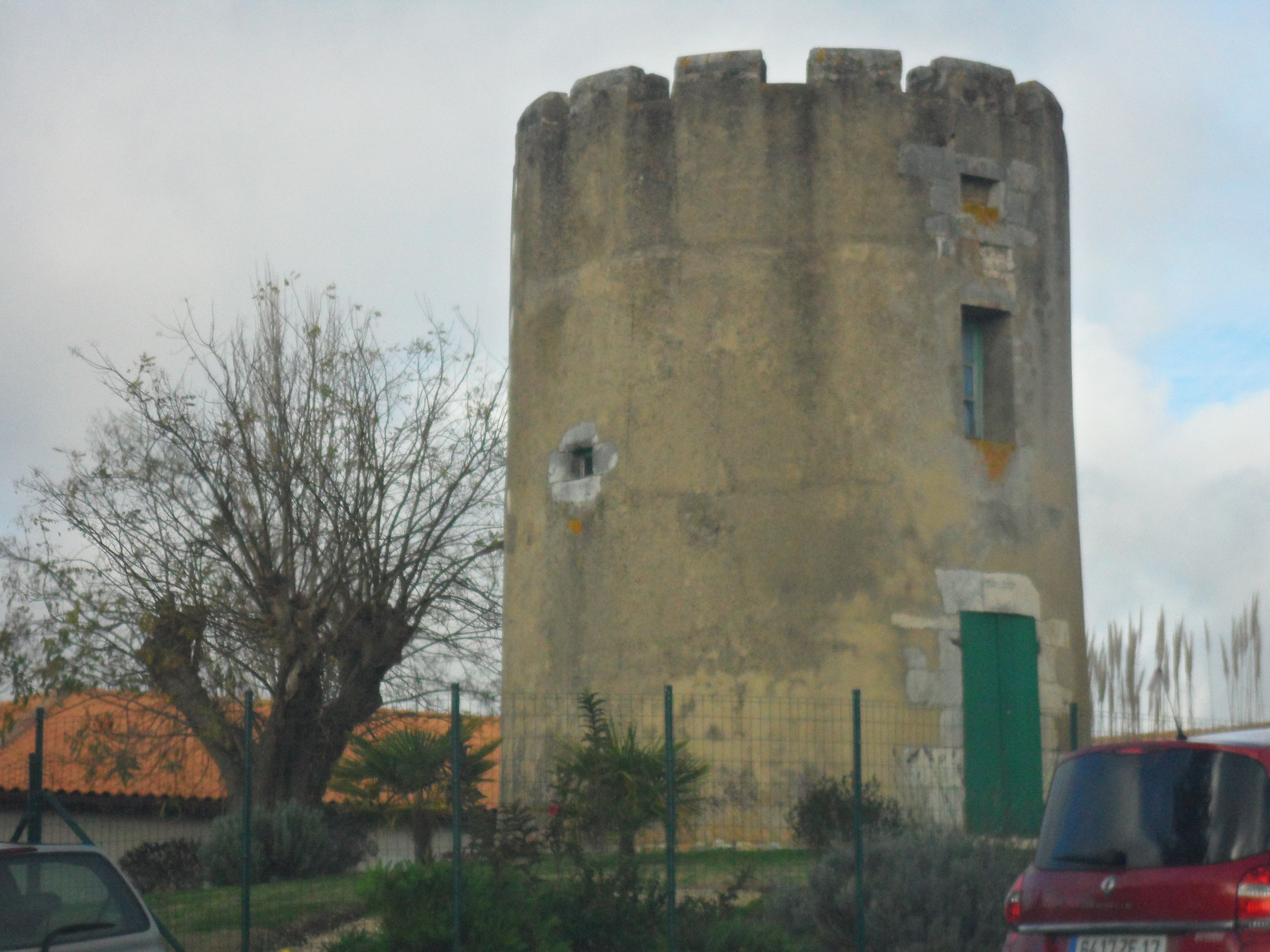
The Cabouci Mill

At the beginning of the 19th century the commune still had twenty windmills but only four have survived. Le Moulin des Justices (Justices mill), built in the 16th century, is the oldest of them. This mill is named after the place where manorial justice was executed under the Ancien Régime. Its sails, which are missing, were built on the Berton system which allowed adjustment to the sails even when the mill was in operation.

Stèle of General de Gaulle

This stele dates from 1949 and commemorates the arrival of General de Gaulle in Arvert on 22 April 1945 shortly after the Liberation of the Arvert peninsula and the Royan pocket. It took three days of fierce fighting to finally obtain the capitulation of the last German troops entrenched in their bunkers in the Forest of la Coubre.

=== Other sites and monuments ===
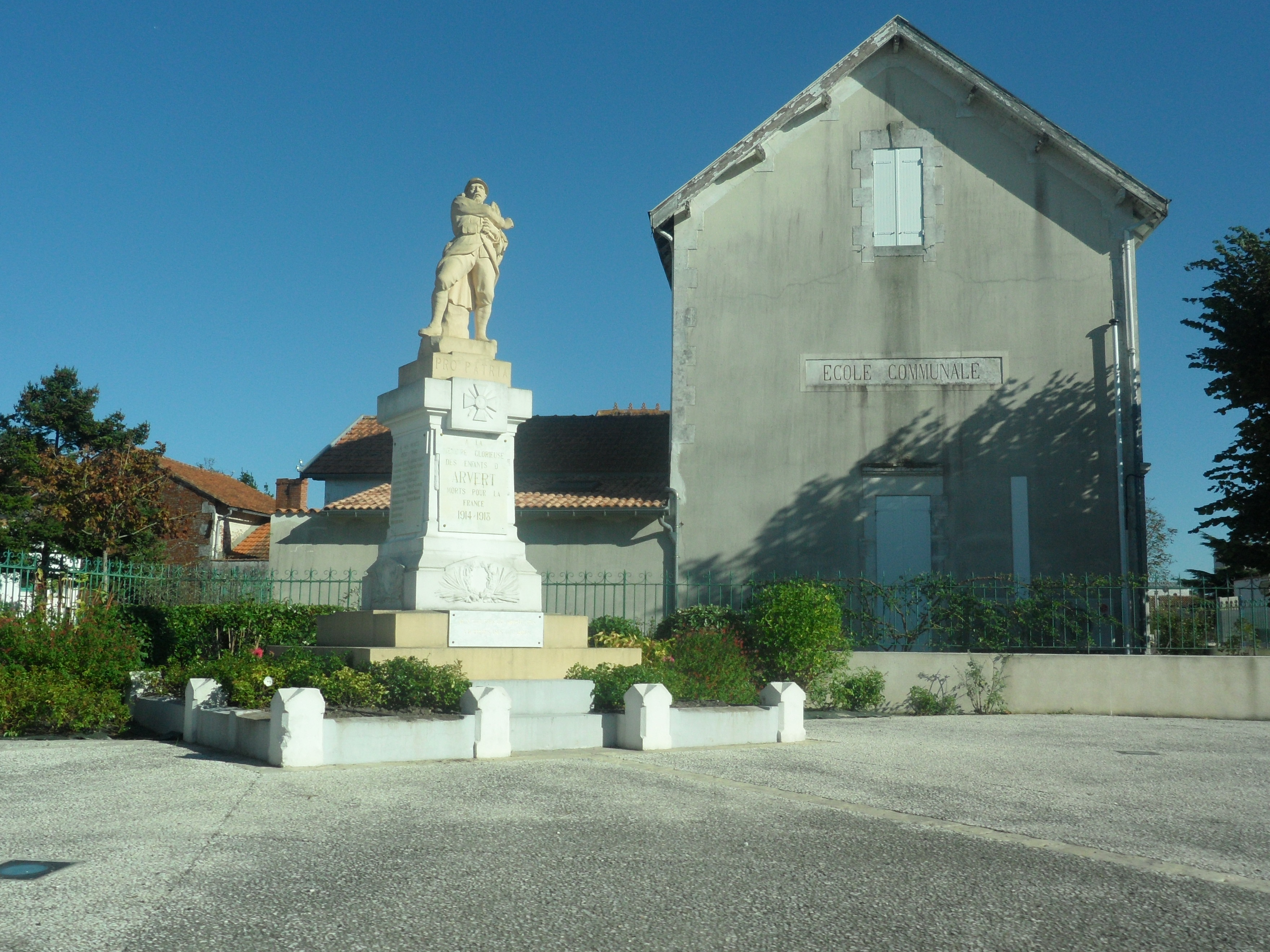
War Memorial and the old school

- Several mills located in the commune: the Cabouci Mill, the Lauriers Mill, the Petit Pont Mill
- A domed well in the church square.
- The port of La Grève à Duret and the port of Coux
- The tourist Train des mouettes passes through the commune
- The lodgings of Fouilloux
- The War memorial

=== Culture ===
Cultural facilities

Arvert has a Public Library located opposite the Town Hall (in the premises of the old town hall).

Saintongeais language

Map showing the linguistic area of Saintongeais in Charentes and North-Gironde

The commune is located in the linguistic area of Saintonge, a dialect belonging to the family of Langues d'oïl branch of the Romance languages, which also includes French, Angevin, Picard, and Poitevin with which it is often grouped in the broader classification of Poitevin-Saintongeais.

Saintongeais (saintonjhais) is the vernacular spoken in the former provinces of Aunis, Saintonge, and Angoumois. It is also called Charentais or patois Charentais. Speakers are called patoisants. Saintongeais strongly influenced Acadian and therefore, by extension, Cajun. Quebecois was influenced by dialects such as Norman, Francien, and Saintongeais.

The Saintongeais language has many features in common with languages such as Cajun or Acadian which is explained by the Saintonge origins of some of the emigrants to New France in the 17th century.

Gastronomy

Saintonge gastronomy is mainly focused on three types of products: the products of the land, the sea, and the vine.

Pork preparations dominate the regional cuisine:

- gratons or grillons, kinds of Rillettes based on fried meats and preserved in their fat,
- gigorit or gigourit, a Jugging combining blood, throat, liver, and onions, sauce de la pire, onions, and local white wine.

The Saintonge kitchen includes many recipes for cagouilles, the local name of the brown garden snail. Saintonge meat is especially cooked "à la charentaise" - i.e. cooked in a broth accented with white wine, garlic, and bread crumbs.

Among other local specialties there are the pibales (Eels) (fry of eel caught in the Gironde, speciality of Mortagne-sur-Gironde and Blaye), oysters from Marennes-Oléron, sardines of Royan, thyeusses de gueurnouilles (Frog legs), and sanglette - a cake prepared with chicken blood and cooked onions.

Traditional desserts are from peasant cuisine: Millas (cornflour cake, found in much of the South-West of France), galette charentaise (Charente waffle) in Charentes-Poitou butter, or "merveilles" (doughnuts).

Arvert is located in the wine production area of "ordinary wood".

== Bibliography ==
- Paul Travers, Pastor of Mathes, In Arvert country, historical and folklorical work, 1973 (in French)
- Henri Moreau, Lords and Domains in Arvert, 2008 (in French)

== See also ==
- Communes of the Charente-Maritime department
