= Côte de Beauté =

Place in France

Coordinates: 45.65°N 1.11°W

Location of Côte de Beauté in Nouvelle-Aquitaine

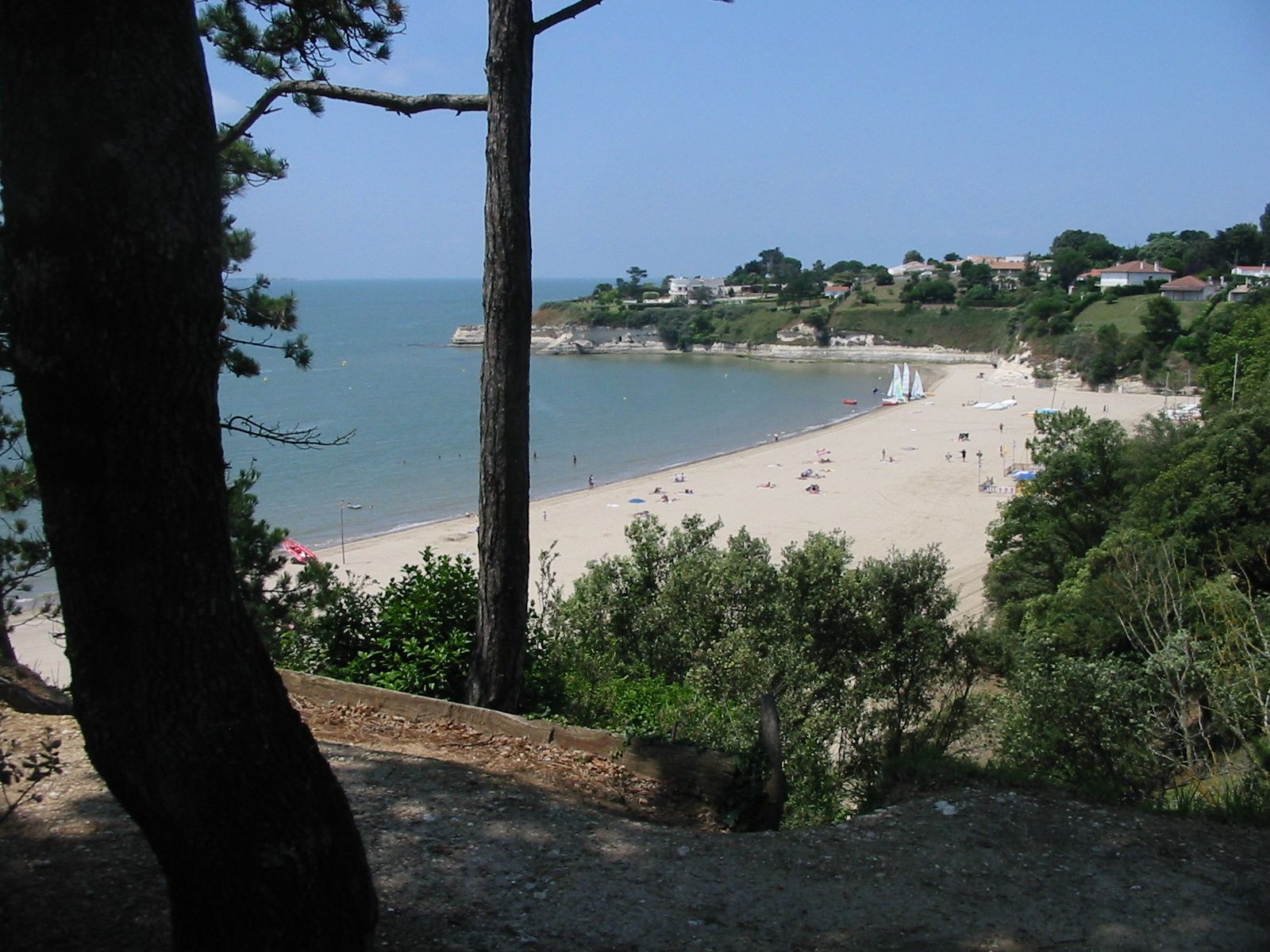
Meschers Beach

The Côte de Beauté (French pronunciation: [kot də bote], literally Beauty Coast) is a part of the south-western coastline of France, situated south of the peninsula of Arvert, in the department of Charente-Maritime (region Nouvelle-Aquitaine). Its capital is the town of Royan.

The limits are, approximately, Coubre Point on the edge of the Atlantic Ocean, in the commune of Les Mathes, and the cliffs of Meschers-sur-Gironde, on the estuary of Gironde. Nevertheless, the National Counsel of Geographic Information considers that the Côte de Beauté extends from Coubre Point, in Charente-Maritime up to Négade Point in Gironde.

Six seaside resorts constitute the backbone of tourism in the Côte de Beauté:

- La Palmyre (commune of Les Mathes)
- Saint-Palais-sur-Mer
- Vaux-sur-Mer
- Royan
- Saint-Georges-de-Didonne
- Meschers-sur-Gironde

Following the definition of the National Council of Geographic Information two more can be included, Le Verdon-sur-Mer and Soulac-sur-Mer (on the opposite bank of the estuary, in Gironde).

The name Côte de Beauté was invented by the Miss Europe committee in 1931, replacing the former name of Côte d'Argent that still refers to the part of the Aquitaine coast that is between Medoc and the Basque country.
