= Breuillet =

Breuillet may refer to places in France:

- Breuillet, Charente-Maritime
- Breuillet, Essonne
