= Canton of La Tremblade =

Coordinates: 45.77°N 1.14°W

The canton of La Tremblade is an administrative division of the Charente-Maritime department, western France. Its borders were modified at the French canton reorganisation which came into effect in March 2015. Its seat is in La Tremblade.

It consists of the following communes:

1. Arvert
2. Breuillet
3. Chaillevette
4. Étaules
5. Les Mathes
6. Mornac-sur-Seudre
7. Saint-Augustin
8. Saint-Palais-sur-Mer
9. La Tremblade
