= Chaillevette =

- Commune
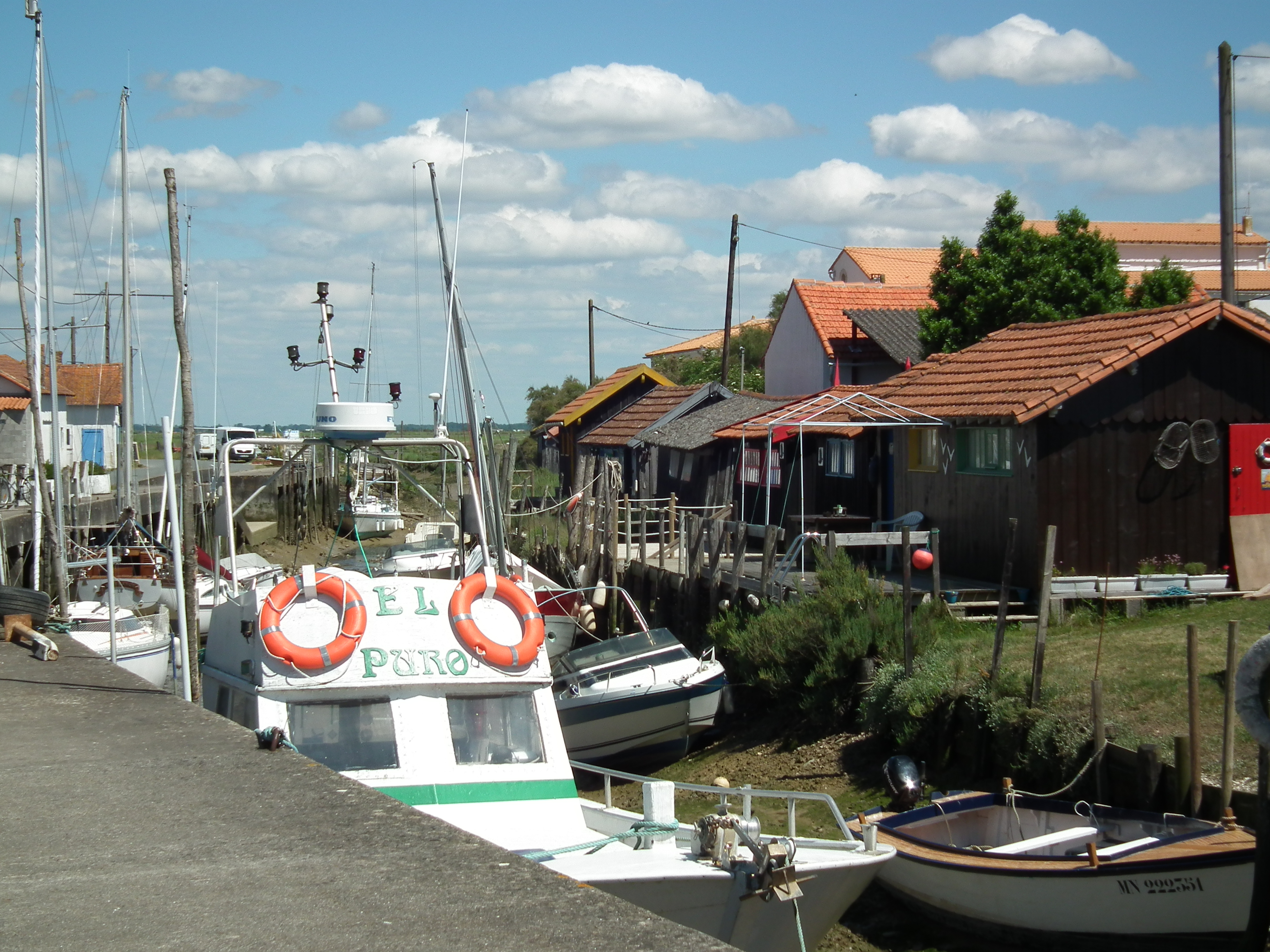
- The moorings in Chatressac
- Location of Chaillevette
- Location within France Location within Nouvelle-Aquitaine
- Coordinates: 45°43′48″N 1°02′35″W
- Country: France
- Region: Nouvelle-Aquitaine
- Department: Charente-Maritime
- Arrondissement: Rochefort
- Canton: La Tremblade
- Intercommunality: CA Royan Atlantique

Government
  - Mayor (2024–2026): Angèle Bazin
- Area^{1}: 10.03 km^{2} (3.87 sq mi)
- Highest elevation: 28 m (92 ft)
- Lowest elevation: 0 m (0 ft)
- Population (2023): 1,664
  - Density: 165.9/km^{2} (429.7/sq mi)
- Time zone: UTC+01:00 (CET)
  - Summer (DST): UTC+02:00 (CEST)
- INSEE/Postal code: 17079 /17890
- ^{1} French Land Register data, which excludes lakes, ponds, glaciers > 1 km^{2} (0.386 sq mi or 247 acres) and river estuaries.

Chaillevette (French pronunciation: [ʃajvɛt]) is a commune in the Charente-Maritime department and Nouvelle-Aquitaine region in southwestern France.

== Population ==
Historical population
Year	Pop.	±% p.a.
1968	1,073	—
1975	1,011	−0.85%
1982	1,019	+0.11%
1990	1,031	+0.15%
1999	1,082	+0.54%
2007	1,327	+2.58%
2012	1,467	+2.03%
2017	1,565	+1.30%
2023	1,664	+1.03%
Source: INSEE

== Gallery ==
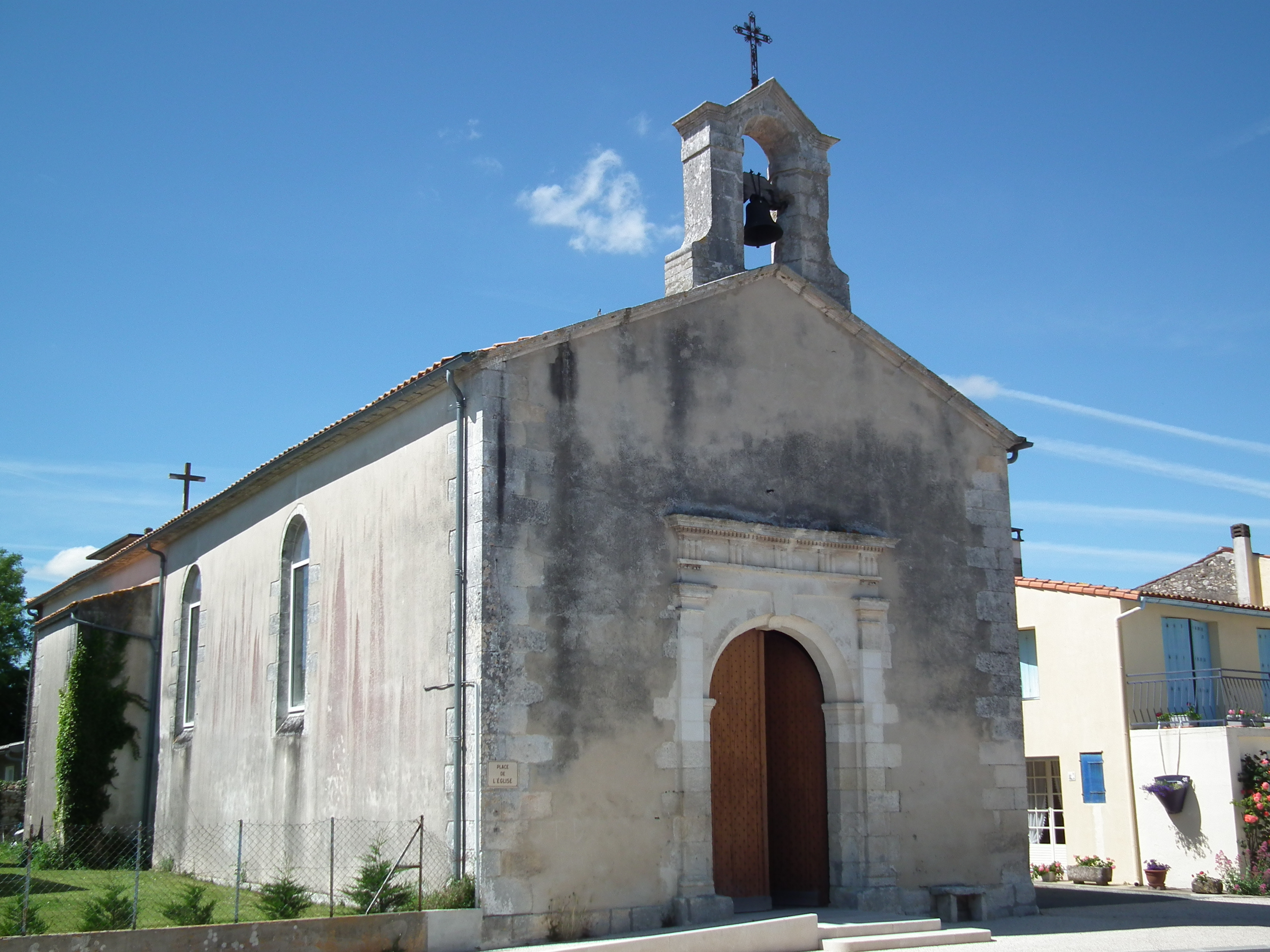

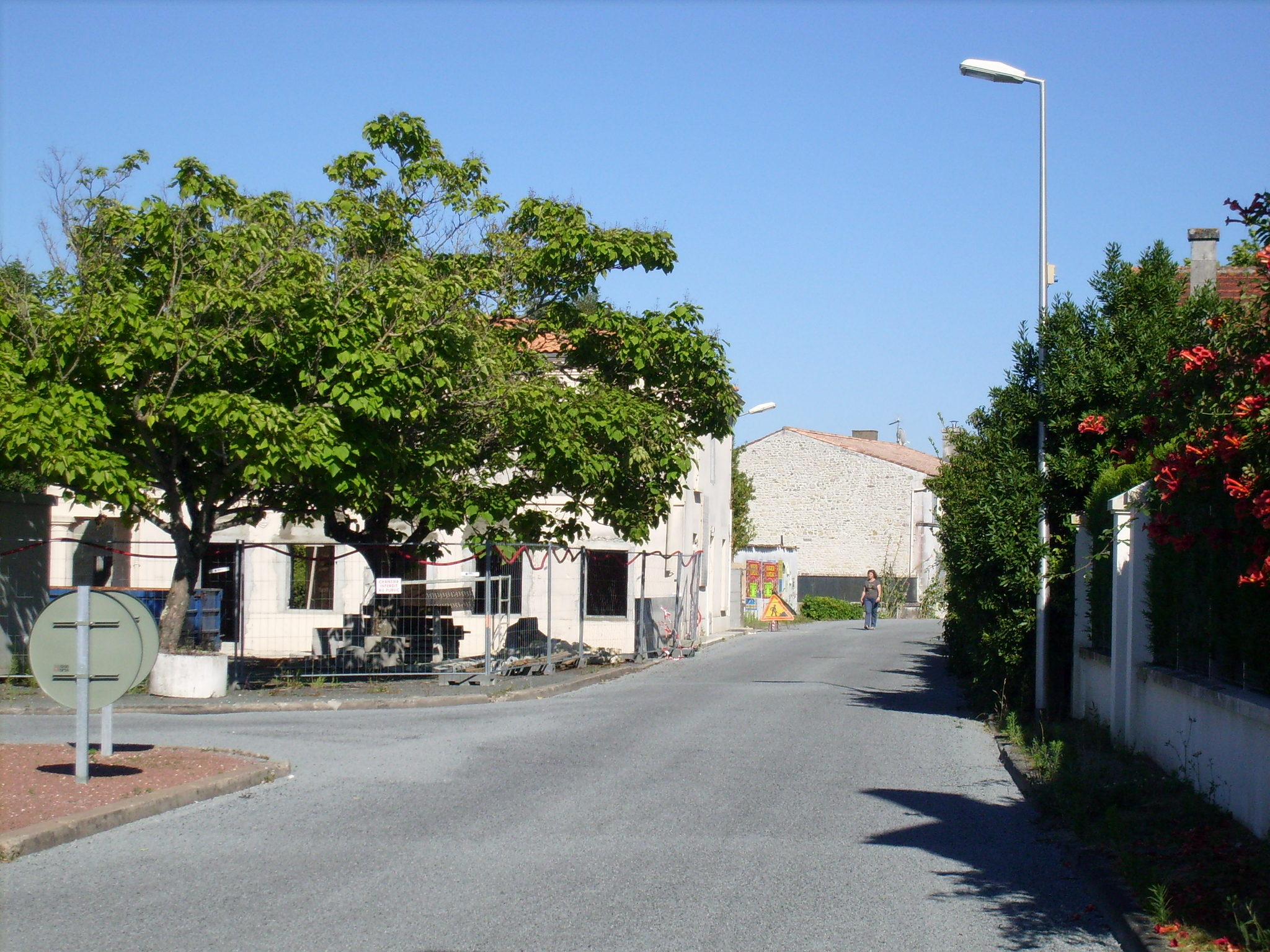

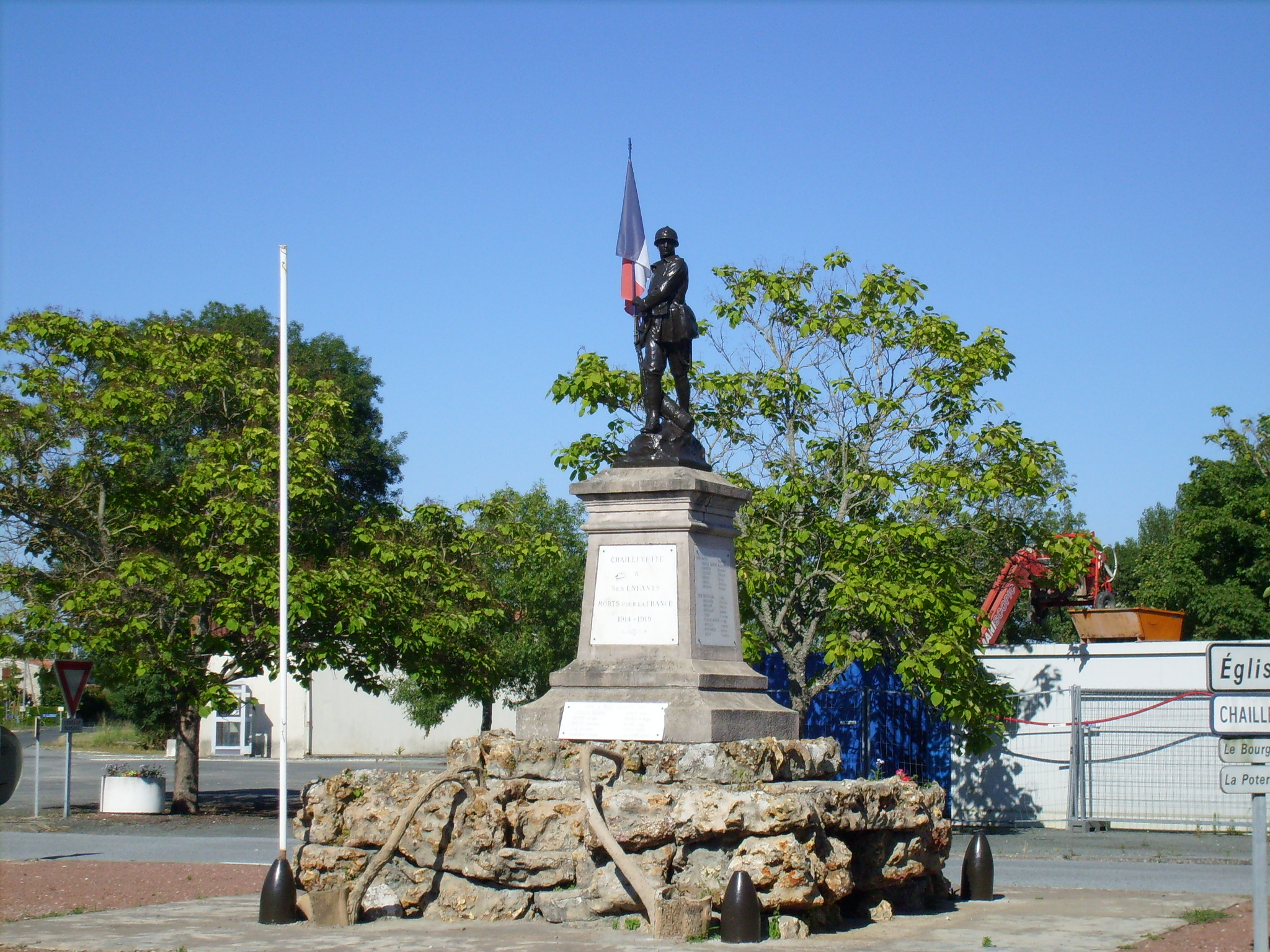

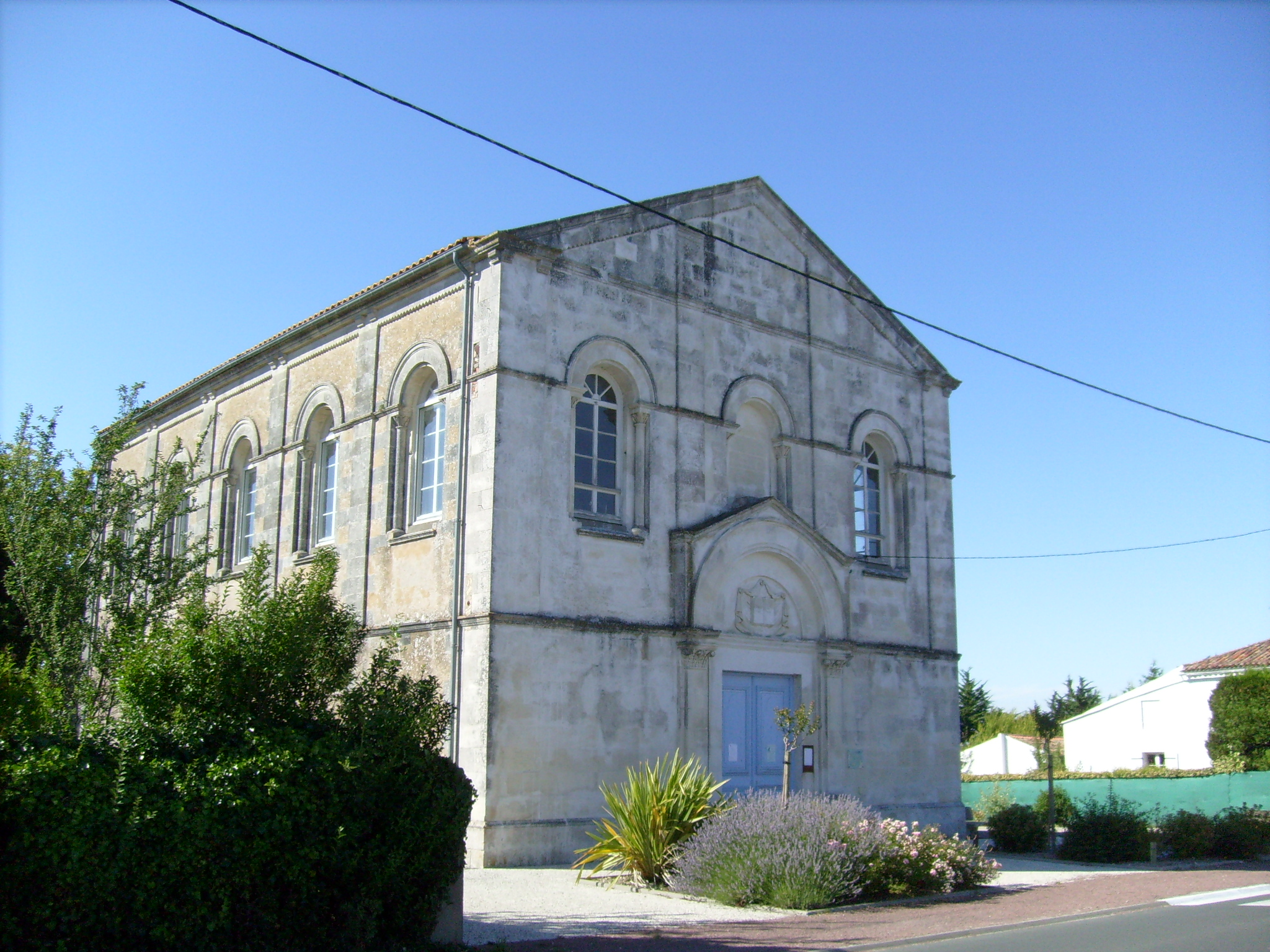

== See also ==
- Communes of the Charente-Maritime department
