= Saint-Just-Luzac =

- Commune
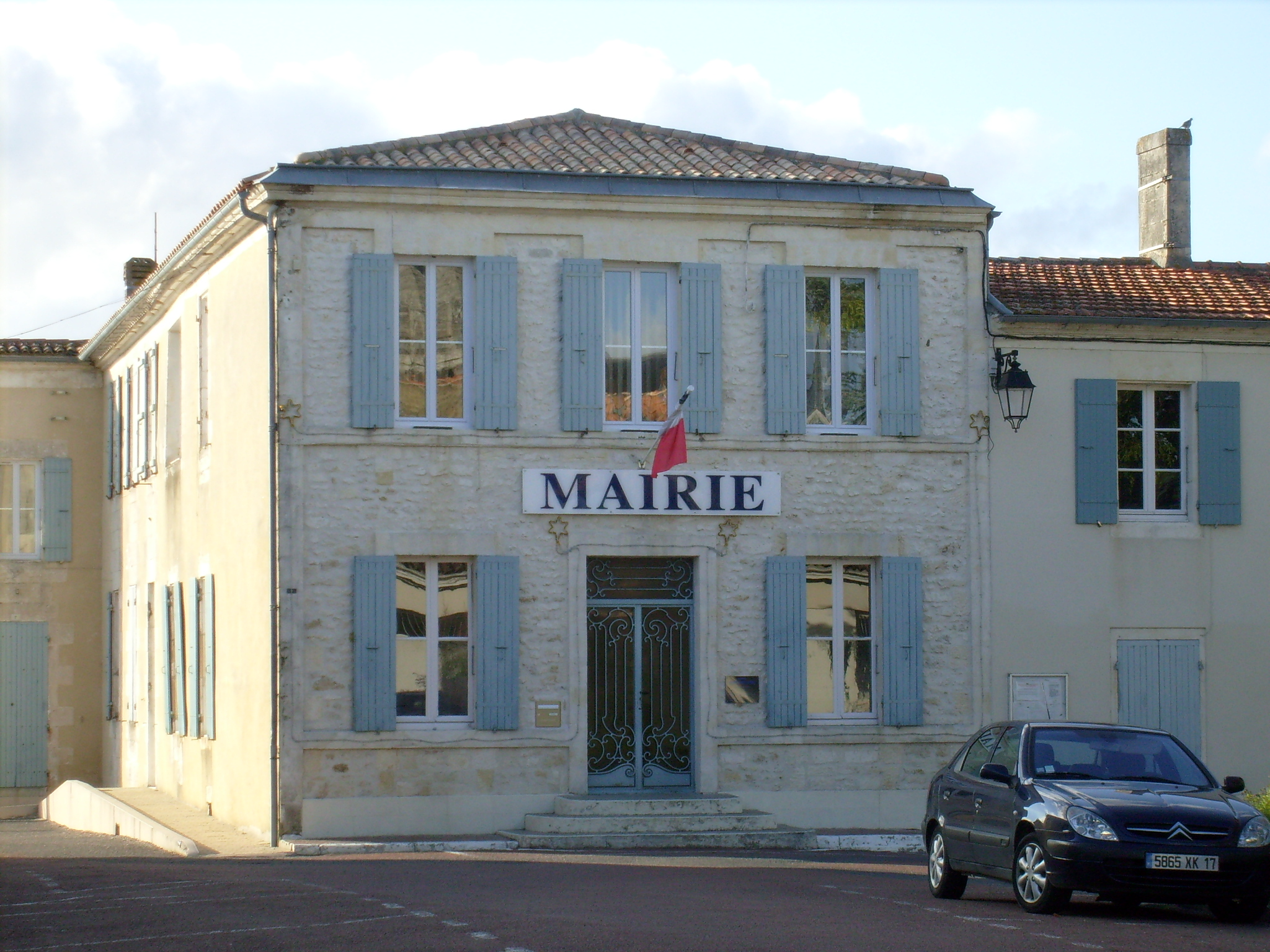
- Town hall

- Coat of arms
- Location of Saint-Just-Luzac
- Location within France Location within Nouvelle-Aquitaine
- Coordinates: 45°48′09″N 1°02′12″W
- Country: France
- Region: Nouvelle-Aquitaine
- Department: Charente-Maritime
- Arrondissement: Rochefort
- Canton: Marennes
- Intercommunality: Bassin de Marennes

Government
  - Mayor (2020–2026): Ghislaine Le Rocheleuil-Begu
- Area^{1}: 47.74 km^{2} (18.43 sq mi)
- Elevation: 5 m (16 ft)
- Highest elevation: 18 m (59 ft)
- Lowest elevation: 0 m (0 ft)
- Population (2023): 2,136
  - Density: 44.74/km^{2} (115.9/sq mi)
- Time zone: UTC+01:00 (CET)
  - Summer (DST): UTC+02:00 (CEST)
- INSEE/Postal code: 17351 /17320
- ^{1} French Land Register data, which excludes lakes, ponds, glaciers > 1 km^{2} (0.386 sq mi or 247 acres) and river estuaries.

Saint-Just-Luzac (French pronunciation: [sɛ̃ ʒyst lyzak]) is a commune in the Charente-Maritime department in southwestern France.

== Population ==
Historical population

Year	Pop.	±% p.a.
1793	1,869	—
1800	2,023	+1.14%
1806	1,626	−3.58%
1821	1,757	+0.52%
1831	2,021	+1.41%
1836	1,944	−0.77%
1841	1,926	−0.19%
1846	1,902	−0.25%
1851	1,991	+0.92%
1856	2,044	+0.53%
1861	2,011	−0.33%
1866	1,857	−1.58%
1872	1,809	−0.44%
1876	1,589	−3.19%
1881	1,711	+1.49%
1886	1,769	+0.67%
1891	1,726	−0.49%
1896	1,689	−0.43%
1901	1,688	−0.01%

Year	Pop.	±% p.a.
1906	1,670	−0.21%
1911	1,689	+0.23%
1921	1,516	−1.07%
1926	1,508	−0.11%
1931	1,407	−1.38%
1936	1,325	−1.19%
1946	1,128	−1.60%
1954	1,146	+0.20%
1962	1,136	−0.11%
1968	1,154	+0.26%
1975	1,186	+0.39%
1982	1,313	+1.46%
1990	1,432	+1.09%
1999	1,535	+0.77%
2007	1,772	+1.81%
2012	1,912	+1.53%
2017	1,993	+0.83%
2023	2,136	+1.16%

Source: EHESS and INSEE (1968-2023)

== See also ==
- Communes of the Charente-Maritime department
