= Saint-Palais-sur-Mer =

- Commune
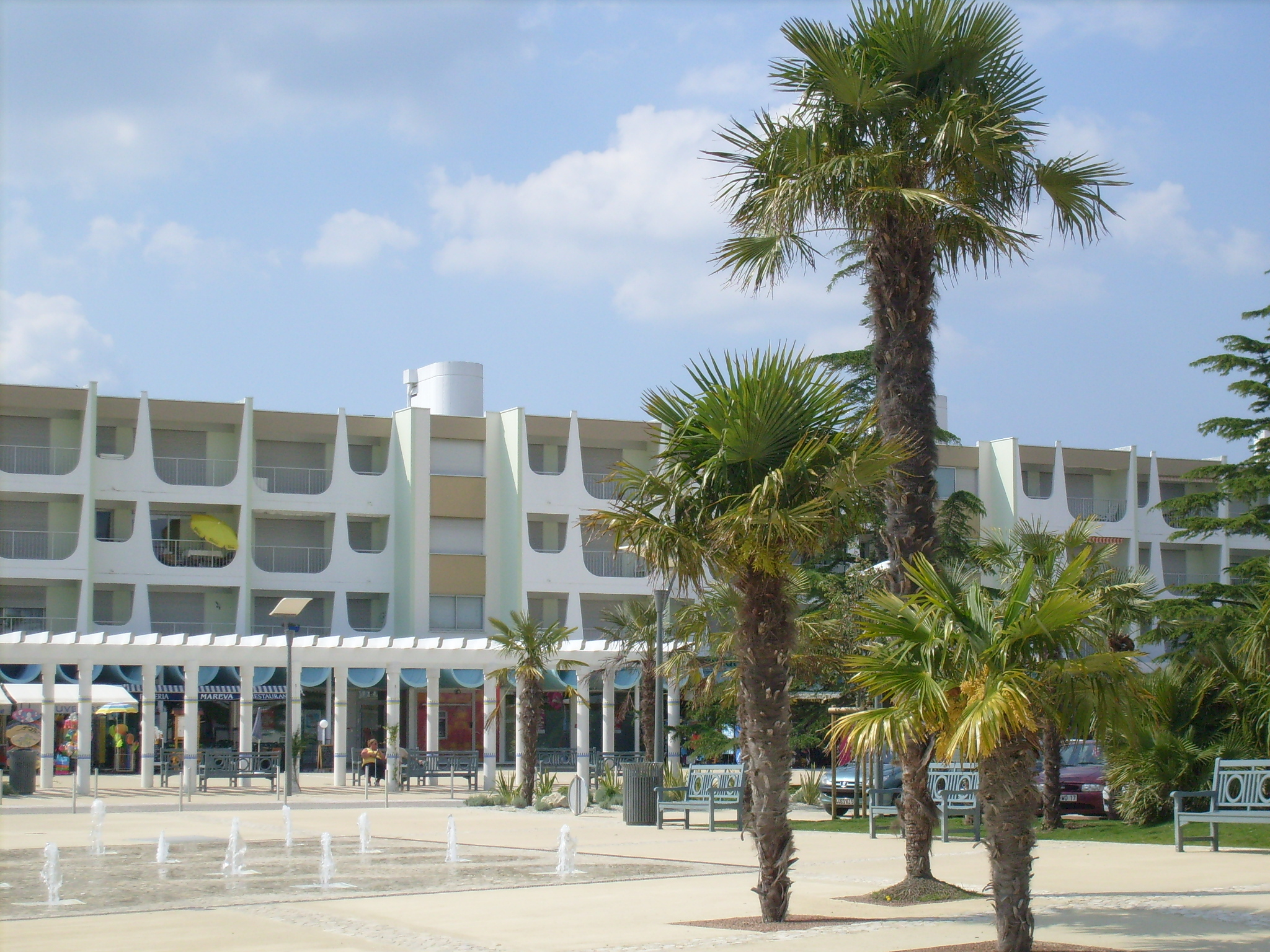
- Place du Rhâ

- Coat of arms
- Location of Saint-Palais-sur-Mer
- Location within France Location within Nouvelle-Aquitaine
- Coordinates: 45°38′38″N 1°05′13″W
- Country: France
- Region: Nouvelle-Aquitaine
- Department: Charente-Maritime
- Arrondissement: Rochefort
- Canton: La Tremblade
- Intercommunality: CA Royan Atlantique

Government
  - Mayor (2024–2026): Claude Baudin
- Area^{1}: 15.69 km^{2} (6.06 sq mi)
- Elevation: 15 m (49 ft)
- Highest elevation: 50 m (160 ft)
- Lowest elevation: 0 m (0 ft)
- Population (2023): 3,840
  - Density: 245/km^{2} (634/sq mi)
- Time zone: UTC+01:00 (CET)
  - Summer (DST): UTC+02:00 (CEST)
- INSEE/Postal code: 17380 /17420
- ^{1} French Land Register data, which excludes lakes, ponds, glaciers > 1 km^{2} (0.386 sq mi or 247 acres) and river estuaries.

Saint-Palais-sur-Mer (French pronunciation: [sɛ̃ palɛ syʁ mɛʁ], literally Saint-Palais on Sea) is a commune in the Charente-Maritime department in southwestern France.

== Population ==
Historical population

Year	Pop.	±% p.a.
1793	748	—
1800	720	−0.54%
1806	741	+0.48%
1821	729	−0.11%
1831	760	+0.42%
1836	762	+0.05%
1841	781	+0.49%
1846	807	+0.66%
1851	802	−0.12%
1856	810	+0.20%
1861	815	+0.12%
1866	763	−1.31%
1872	798	+0.75%
1876	756	−1.34%
1881	791	+0.91%
1886	824	+0.82%
1891	797	−0.66%
1896	820	+0.57%
1901	895	+1.77%

Year	Pop.	±% p.a.
1906	930	+0.77%
1911	1,044	+2.34%
1921	1,082	+0.36%
1926	1,164	+1.47%
1931	1,207	+0.73%
1936	1,262	+0.90%
1946	2,479	+6.98%
1954	2,252	−1.19%
1962	2,192	−0.34%
1968	2,209	+0.13%
1975	2,127	−0.54%
1982	2,370	+1.56%
1990	2,736	+1.81%
1999	3,343	+2.25%
2007	3,830	+1.71%
2012	3,936	+0.55%
2017	3,897	−0.20%
2023	3,840	−0.25%

Source: EHESS and INSEE (1968-2023)

== Gallery ==
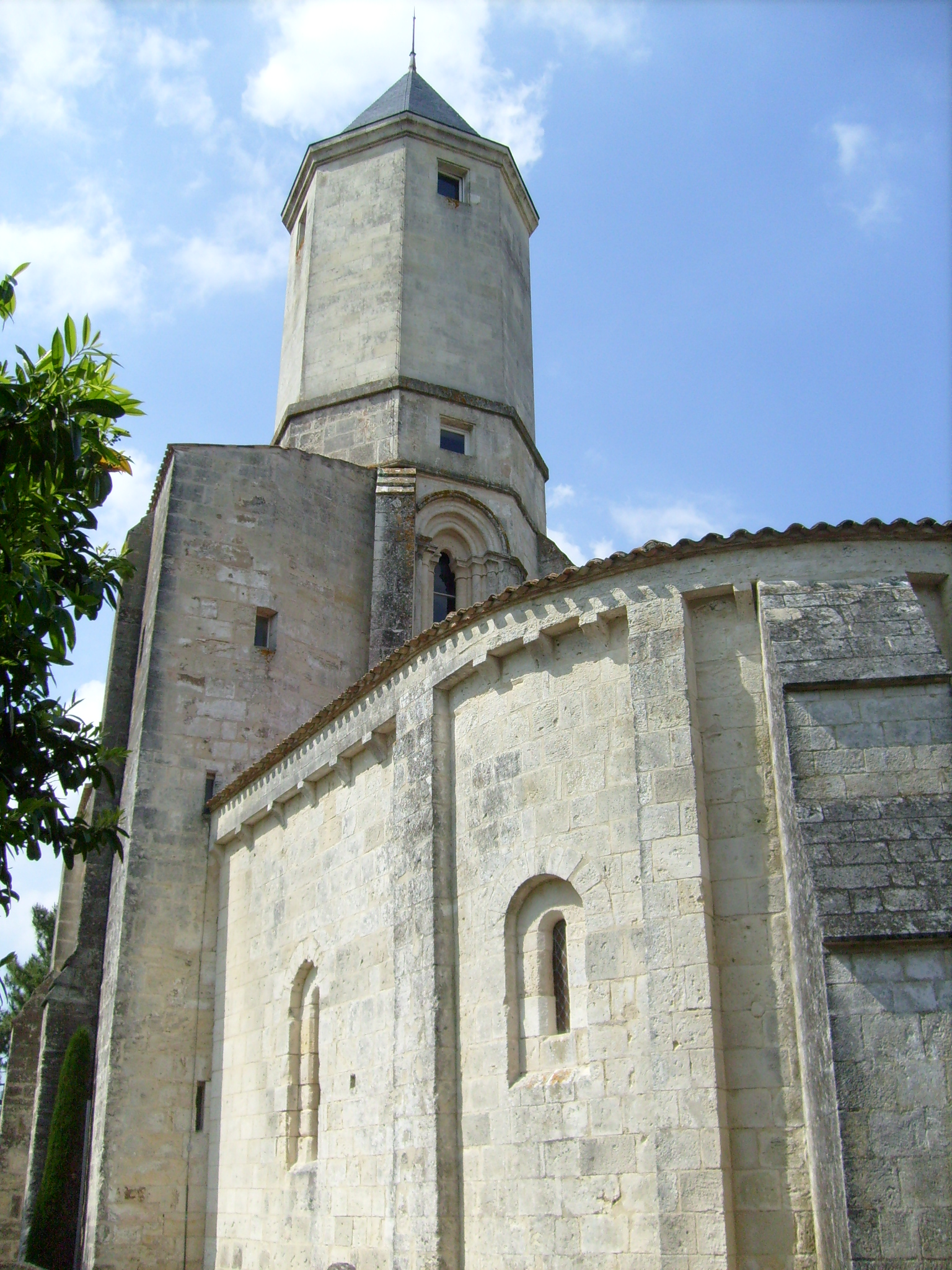

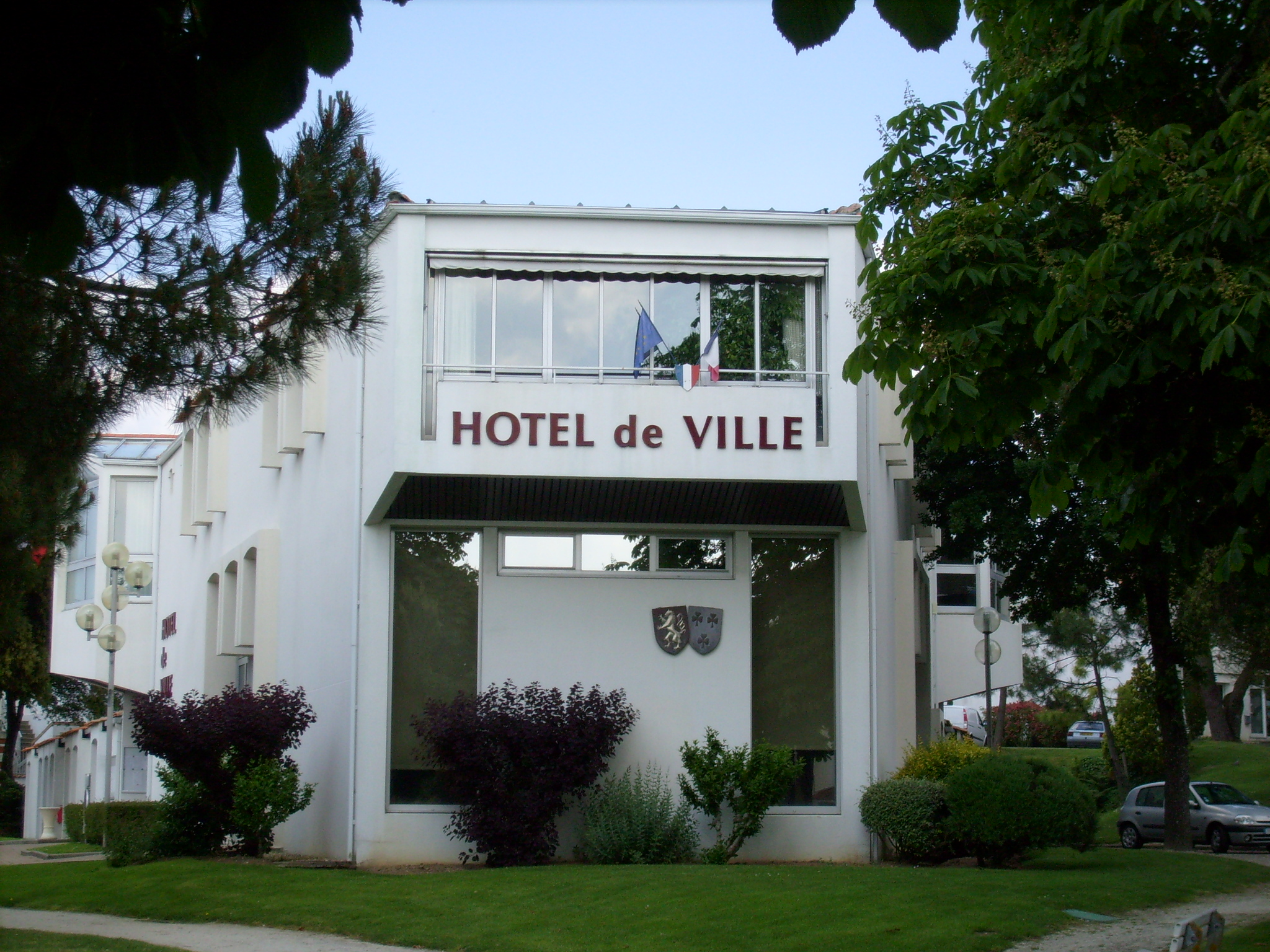

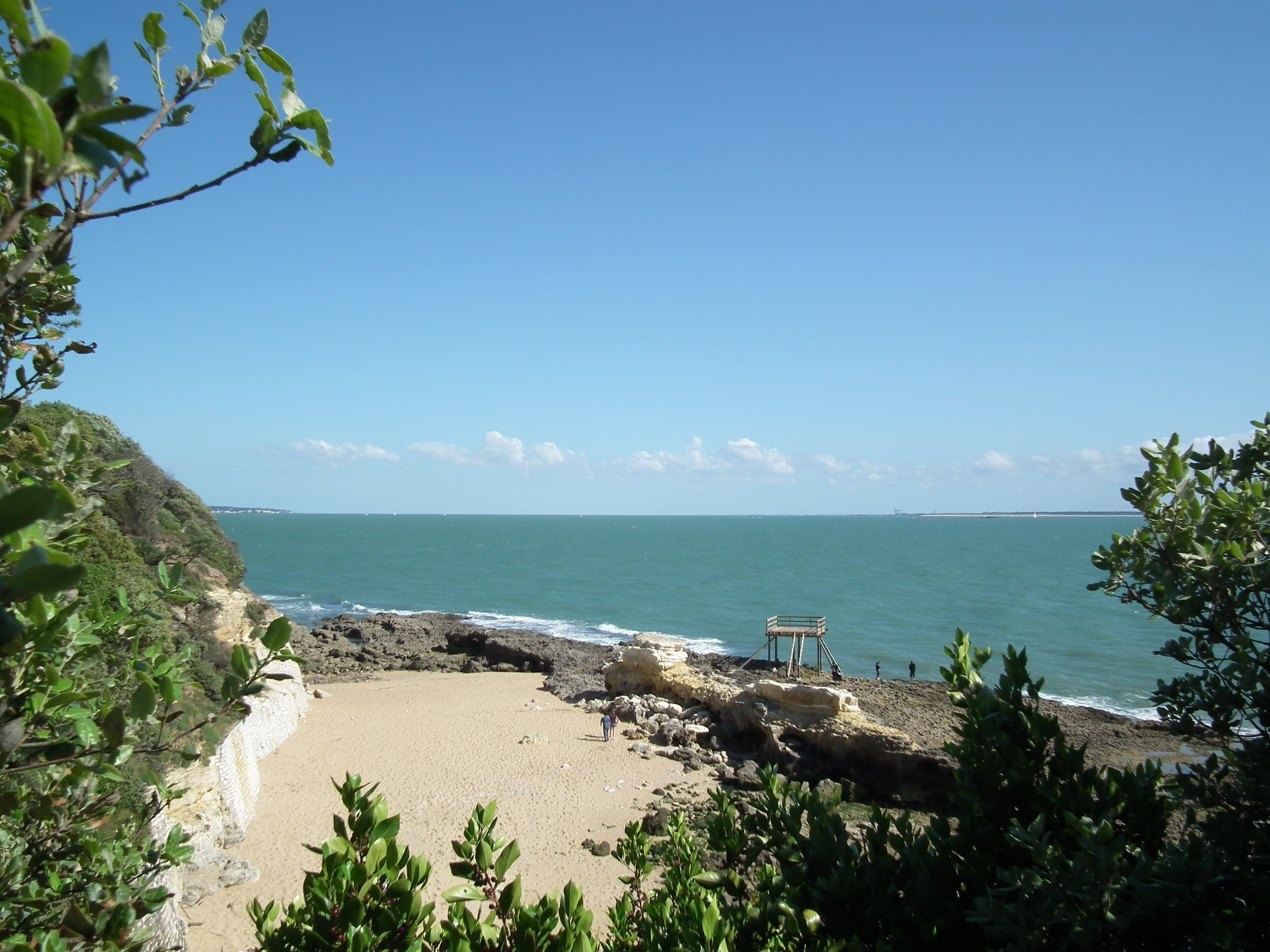

Saint-Palais-sur-Mer in Charente-Maritime

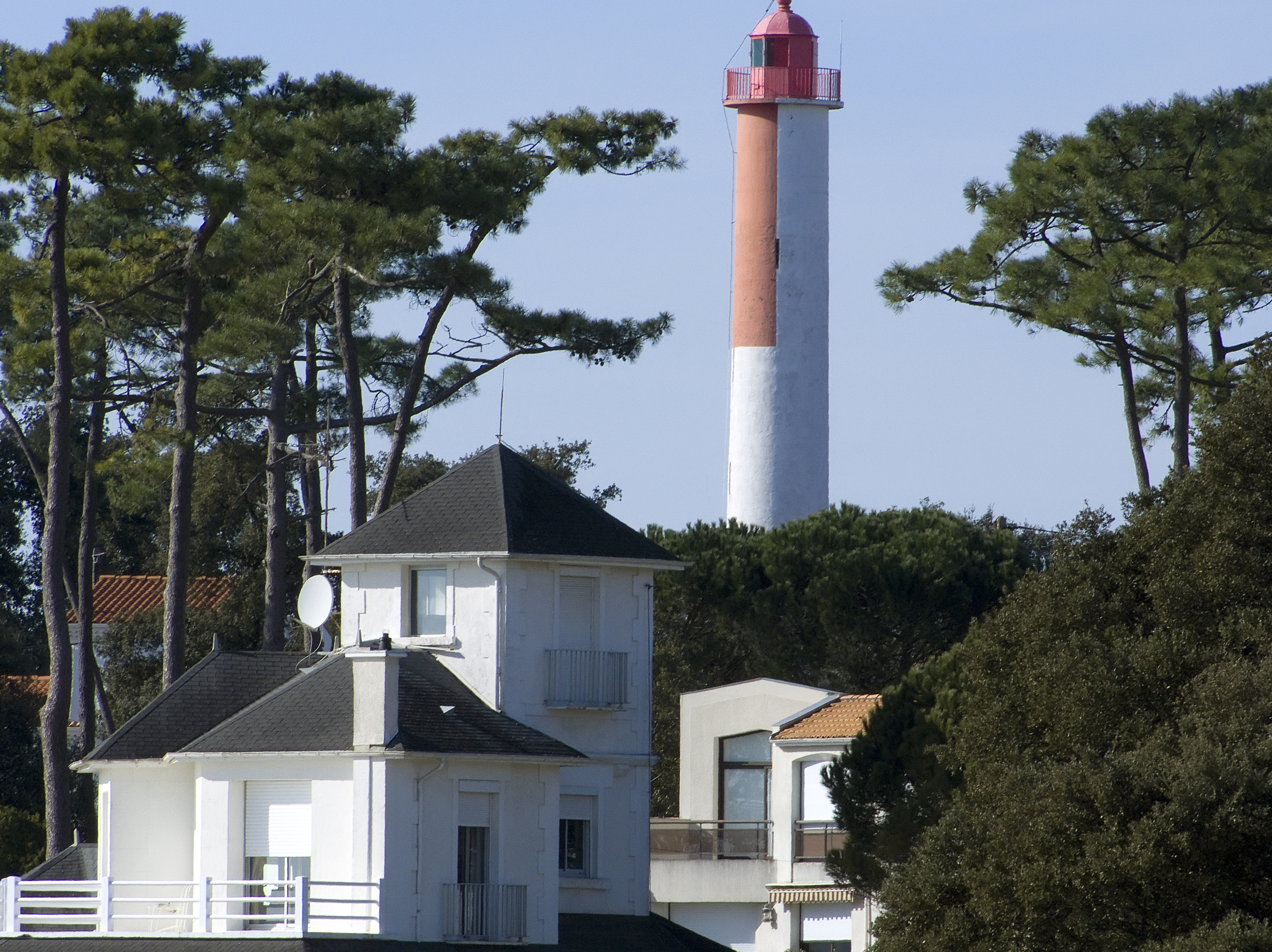

== See also ==
- Communes of the Charente-Maritime department
