= Breuillet, Charente-Maritime =

Breuillet
- Commune
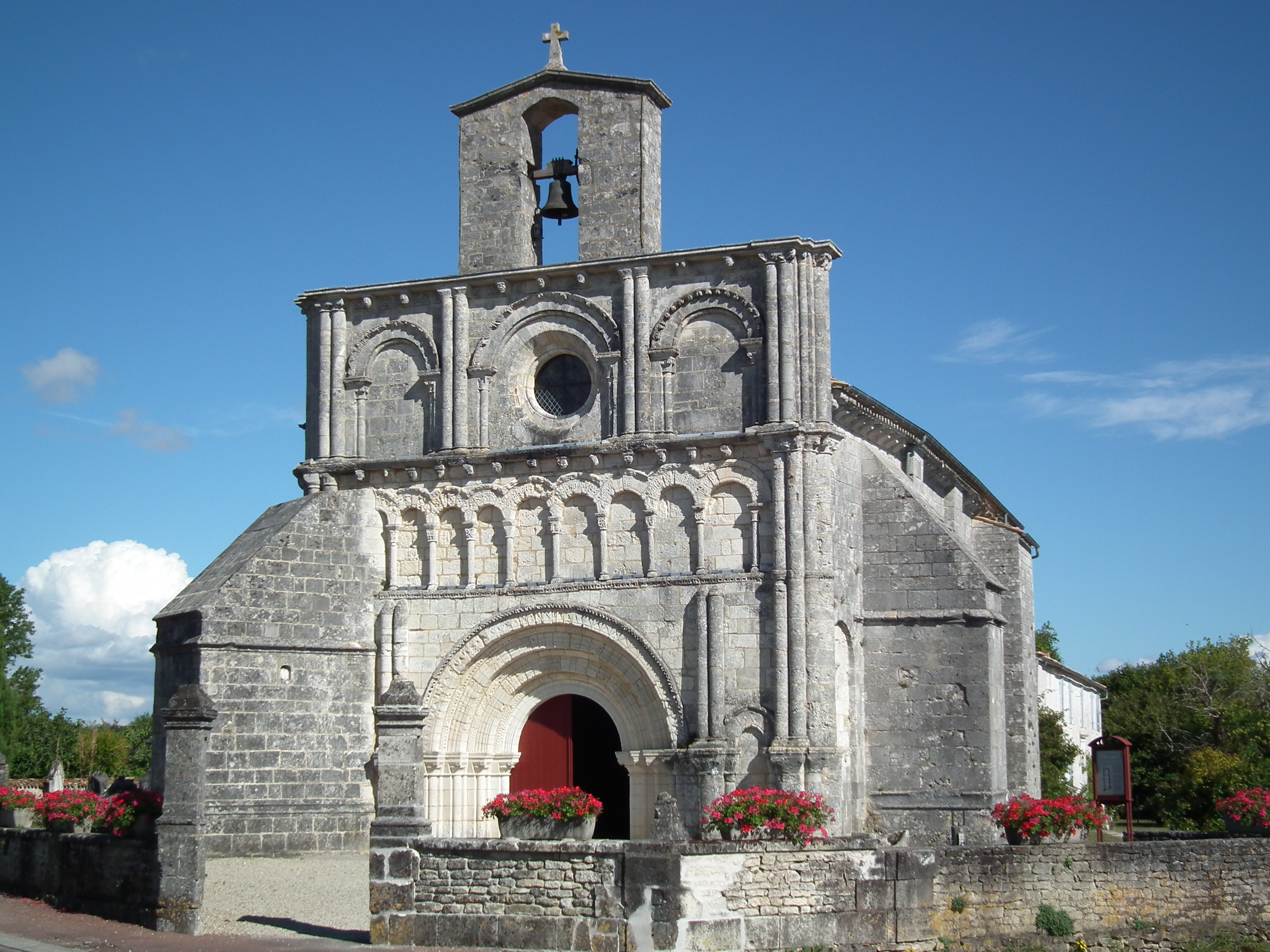
- The church in Breuillet

- Coat of arms
- Location of Breuillet
- Location within France Location within Nouvelle-Aquitaine
- Coordinates: 45°41′37″N 1°03′02″W
- Country: France
- Region: Nouvelle-Aquitaine
- Department: Charente-Maritime
- Arrondissement: Rochefort
- Canton: La Tremblade
- Intercommunality: CA Royan Atlantique

Government
  - Mayor (2020–2026): Jacques Lys
- Area^{1}: 19.99 km^{2} (7.72 sq mi)
- Highest elevation: 34 m (112 ft)
- Lowest elevation: 0 m (0 ft)
- Population (2023): 3,058
  - Density: 153.0/km^{2} (396.2/sq mi)
- Time zone: UTC+01:00 (CET)
  - Summer (DST): UTC+02:00 (CEST)
- INSEE/Postal code: 17064 /17920
- ^{1} French Land Register data, which excludes lakes, ponds, glaciers > 1 km^{2} (0.386 sq mi or 247 acres) and river estuaries.

Breuillet (French pronunciation: [bʁøjɛ]) is a commune in the Charente-Maritime department and Nouvelle-Aquitaine region in southwestern France.

== Population ==
Historical population

Year	Pop.	±% p.a.
1793	1,331	—
1800	1,087	−2.85%
1806	1,198	+1.63%
1821	1,331	+0.70%
1831	1,342	+0.08%
1836	1,320	−0.33%
1841	1,361	+0.61%
1846	1,338	−0.34%
1851	1,276	−0.94%
1856	1,268	−0.13%
1861	1,294	+0.41%
1866	1,260	−0.53%
1872	1,217	−0.58%
1876	1,194	−0.48%
1881	1,214	+0.33%
1886	953	−4.73%
1891	914	−0.83%
1896	923	+0.20%
1901	886	−0.81%

Year	Pop.	±% p.a.
1906	906	+0.45%
1911	868	−0.85%
1921	791	−0.92%
1926	821	+0.75%
1931	760	−1.53%
1936	720	−1.08%
1946	665	−0.79%
1954	782	+2.05%
1962	847	+1.00%
1968	926	+1.50%
1975	1,073	+2.13%
1982	1,346	+3.29%
1990	1,863	+4.15%
1999	2,178	+1.75%
2007	2,539	+1.94%
2012	2,674	+1.04%
2017	2,917	+1.75%
2023	3,058	+0.79%

Source: EHESS and INSEE (1968-2023)

== Gallery ==
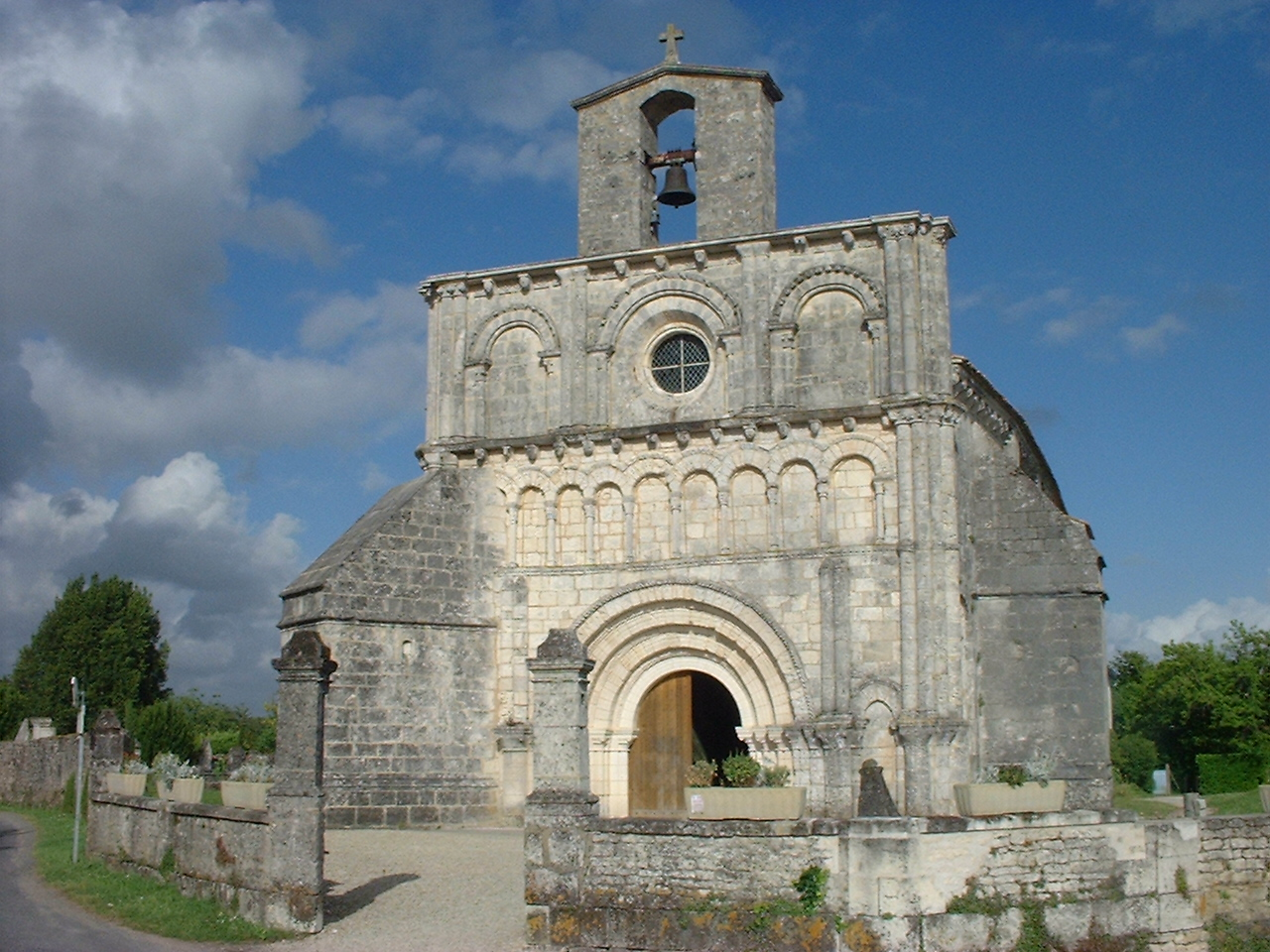

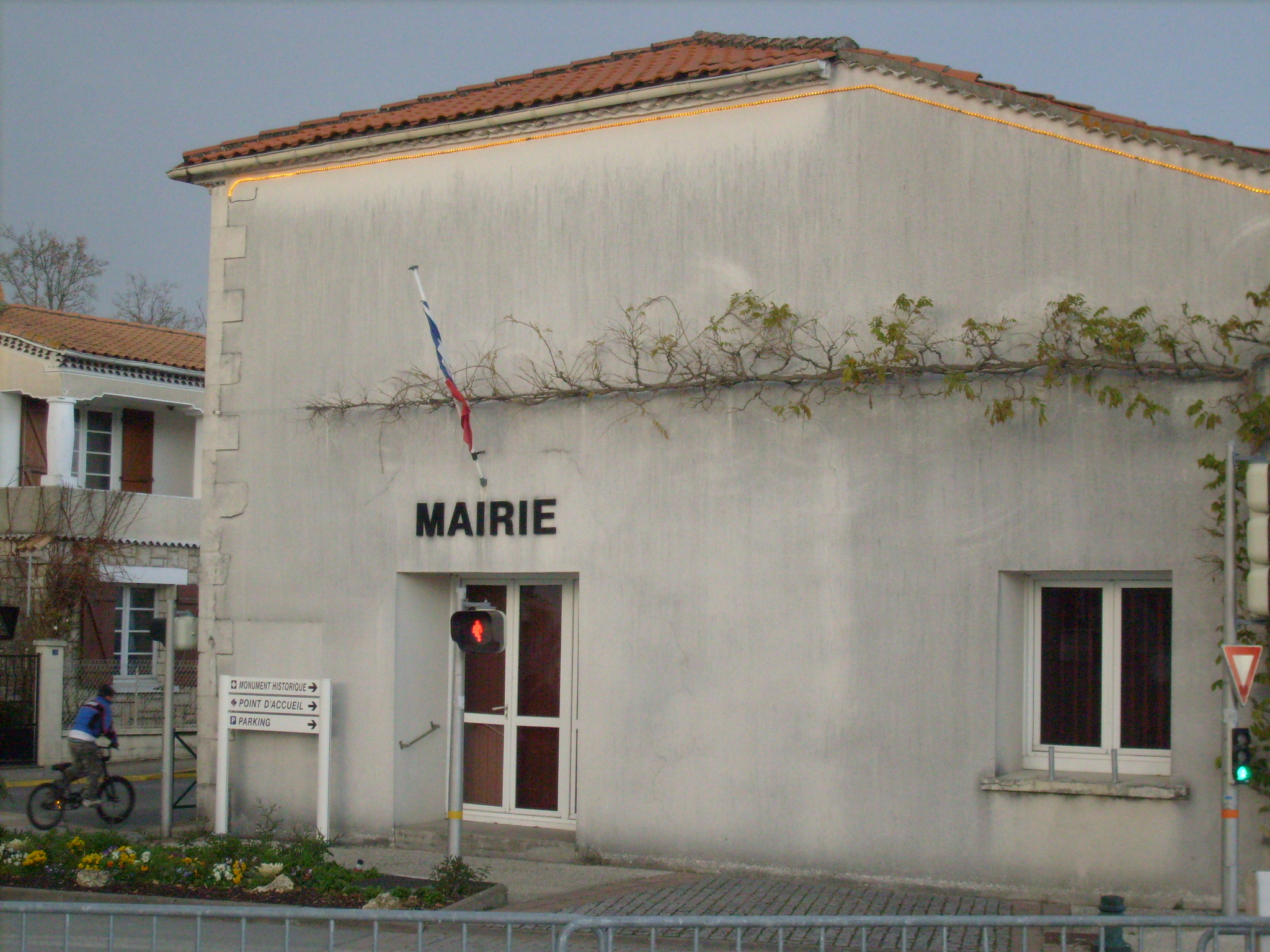

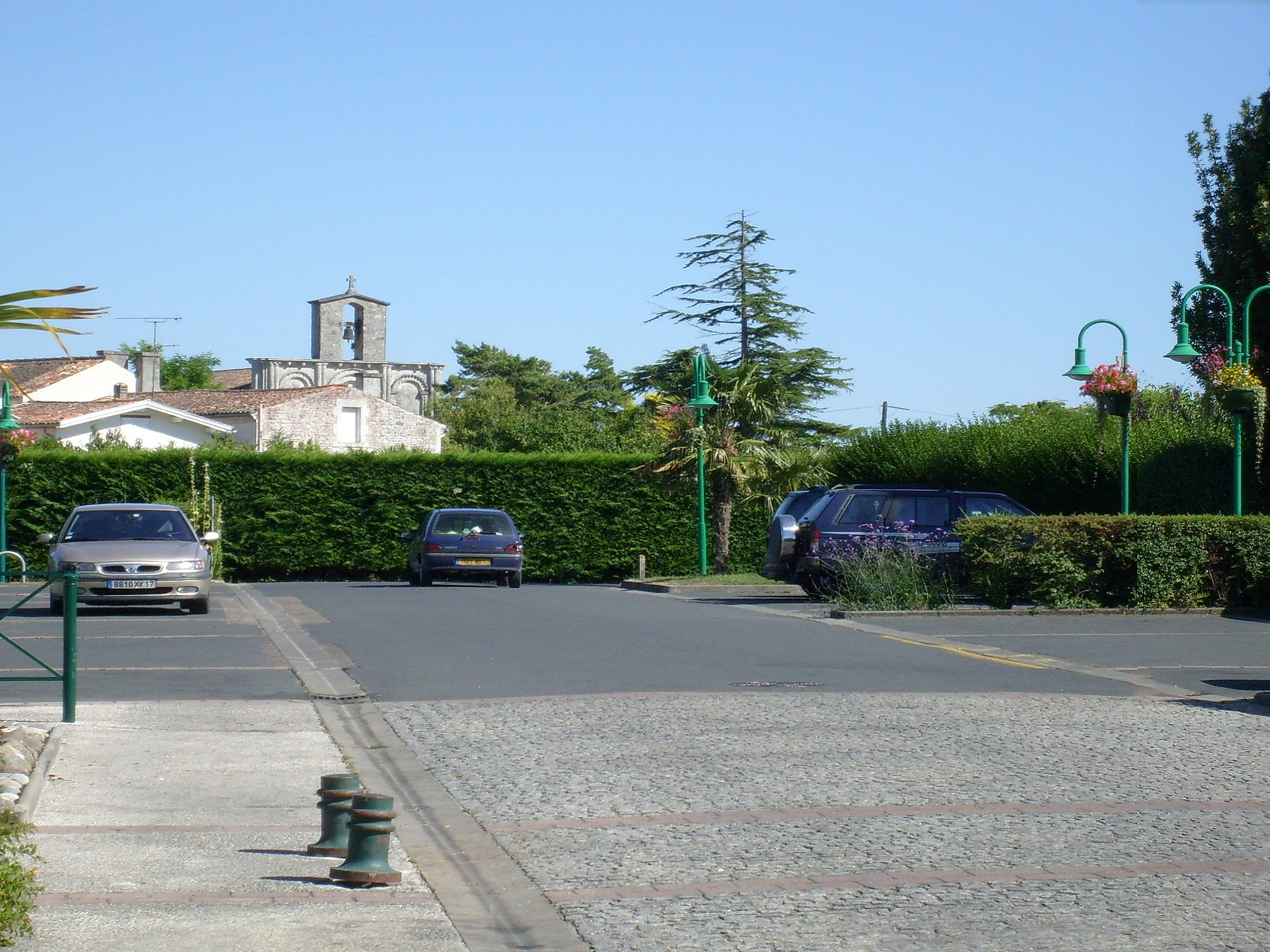

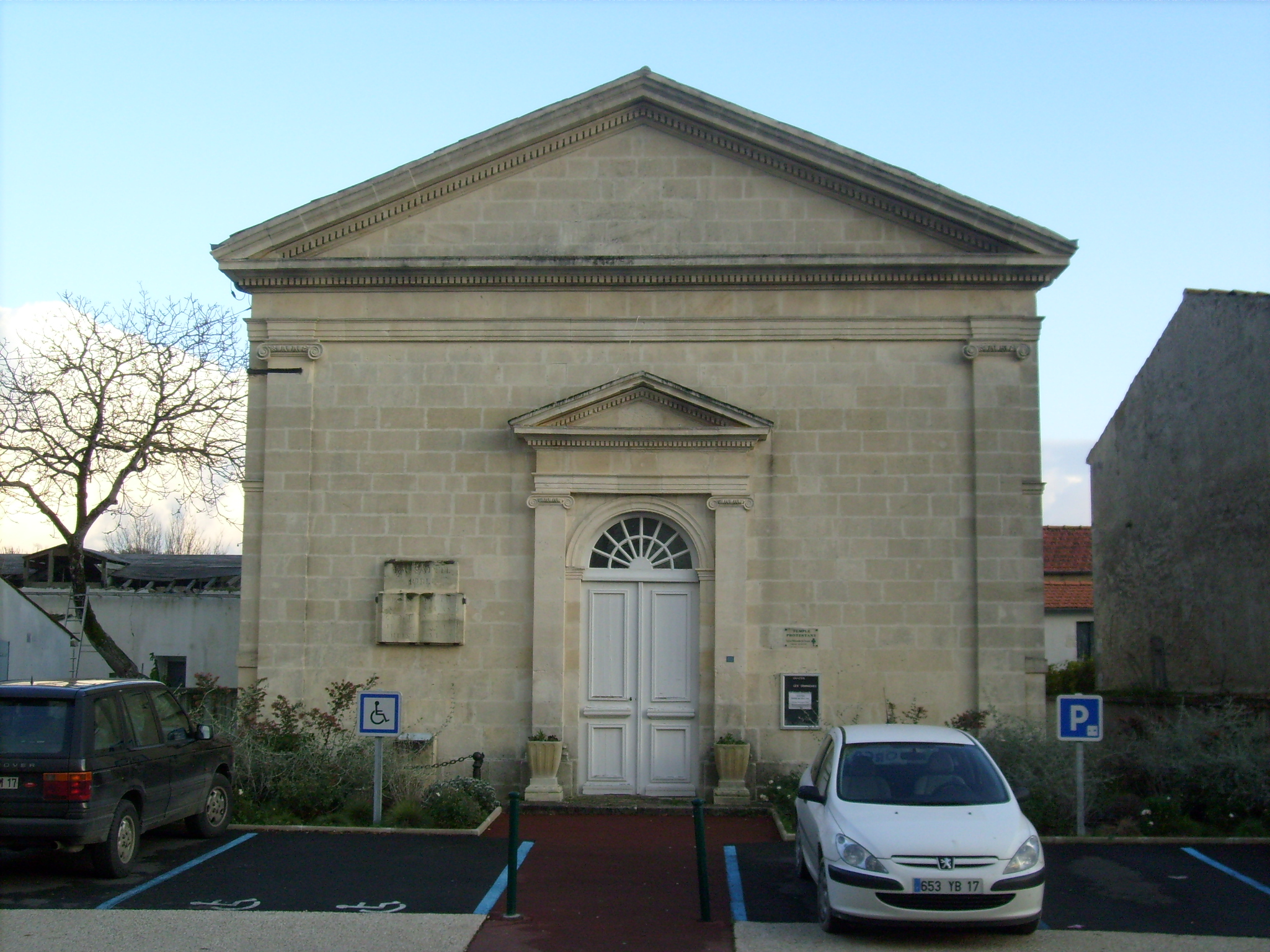

== See also ==
- Communes of the Charente-Maritime department
