= La Coubre Lighthouse =

Lighthouse in Charente-Maritime, France

La Coubre Lighthouse Pointe de La Coubre
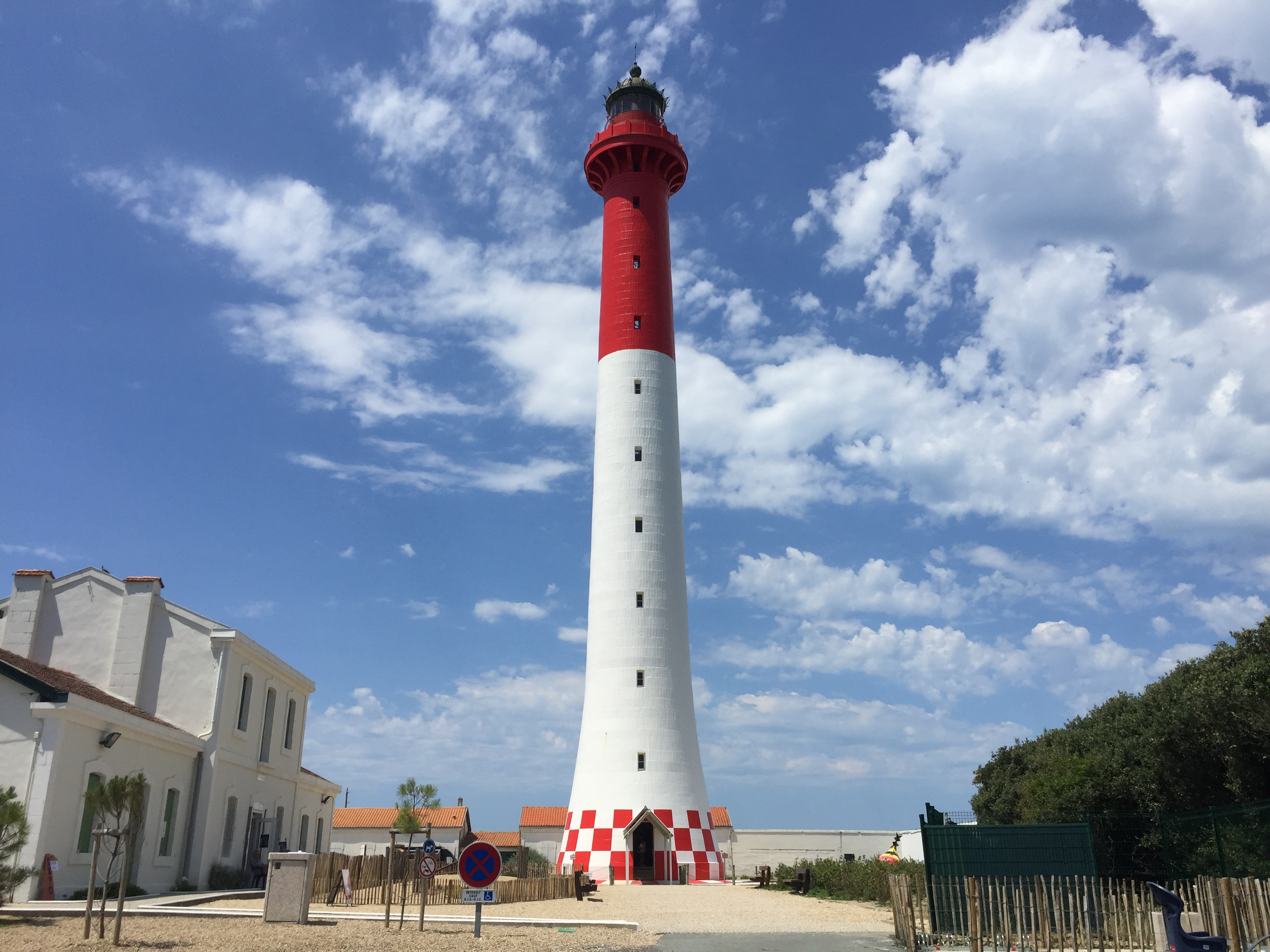
- The newly painted lighthouse in 2017
- Location: La Tremblade, France
- Coordinates: 45°41′48″N 1°14′00″W

Tower
- Constructed: 1830 (first); 1842 (second); 1860 (third); 1895 (fourth)
- Designed by: Paul Alexandre
- Construction: reinforced concrete tower
- Automated: 2000
- Height: 64 metres (210 ft)
- Shape: tapered base cylindrical tower with balcony and lantern
- Markings: white lower 2/3 tower, red upper 1/3 tower, black lantern
- Heritage: monument historique inscrit

Light
- First lit: 1905 (current)
- Focal height: 58 metres (190 ft)
- Lens: 1st order Fresnel lens
- Intensity: 250W bulb
- Range: 28 nautical miles (52 km; 32 mi)
- Characteristic: Fl (2) W 10s. at 42 m. F RW depending on direction

The La Coubre Lighthouse (French: Phare de la Coubre, pronounced [faʁ də la kubʁ]) is a historic lighthouse that is still in service in La Tremblade, in Charente-Maritime, in France.

La Coubre is 64 metres (210 ft) high and is the highest in the department. A museum tells the history of the different lighthouses that have existed in the region. It is possible to climb to the top from February to November.

== Geography ==
The lighthouse is located in the "Pointe of La Coubre", 15 km from Royan and at the north of the Gironde Estuary, close to the Bonne Anse Bay.

The "Pointe of La Coubre" and the sandbank separate the calm water of the Gironde Estuary, and to the north, the Atlantic Ocean. It is the highest Lighthouse in Charente-Maritime and guides the ships into the estuary, avoiding the sandbanks, where many ships have wrecked.

== History ==
- In 1690, there was a beacon on the "Pointe de La Coubre". Some structures were later constructed during the 19th century, but they have since been destroyed.
- In 1860, because of a number of shipwrecks, an imperial decree put in order the construction of a lighthouse, on the northern part of the estuary.
- This wooden lighthouse would soon be replaced in 1895 by a 57-meter-high-stoned lighthouse. In 1892, the construction of this new lighthouse started, 1.5 km away from the ocean. However, ten years later, the erosion threatened it. Therefore, a breakwater was built to try to slow the ocean.
- It was decided to build a new one, 1.8 km away from the previous stoned lighthouse. This one was built with concrete and the stoned lighthouse collapsed in 1907.
- In 2016, the 1905 lighthouse was repainted to be better seen by ships. A ton of paint was used during the three-month work.

== Tourism and museum ==
After climbing the 300 steps among the opaline on the walls, visitors can see the Wild Coast (Côte Sauvage), the beaches, the La Coubre forest, the Gironde Estuary and the Cordouan Lighthouse (the oldest in France).

100 years after the lighthouse was put into service, a museum was built to tell the history of the different lighthouses that have guided the ships. The museum has a few rooms where the history of the lighthouses is told, from 1699 to nowadays. In another room, marine objects are shown, a device measuring the fog, old lenses and other mechanisms.

== See also ==
- List of lighthouses in France

== Gallery ==
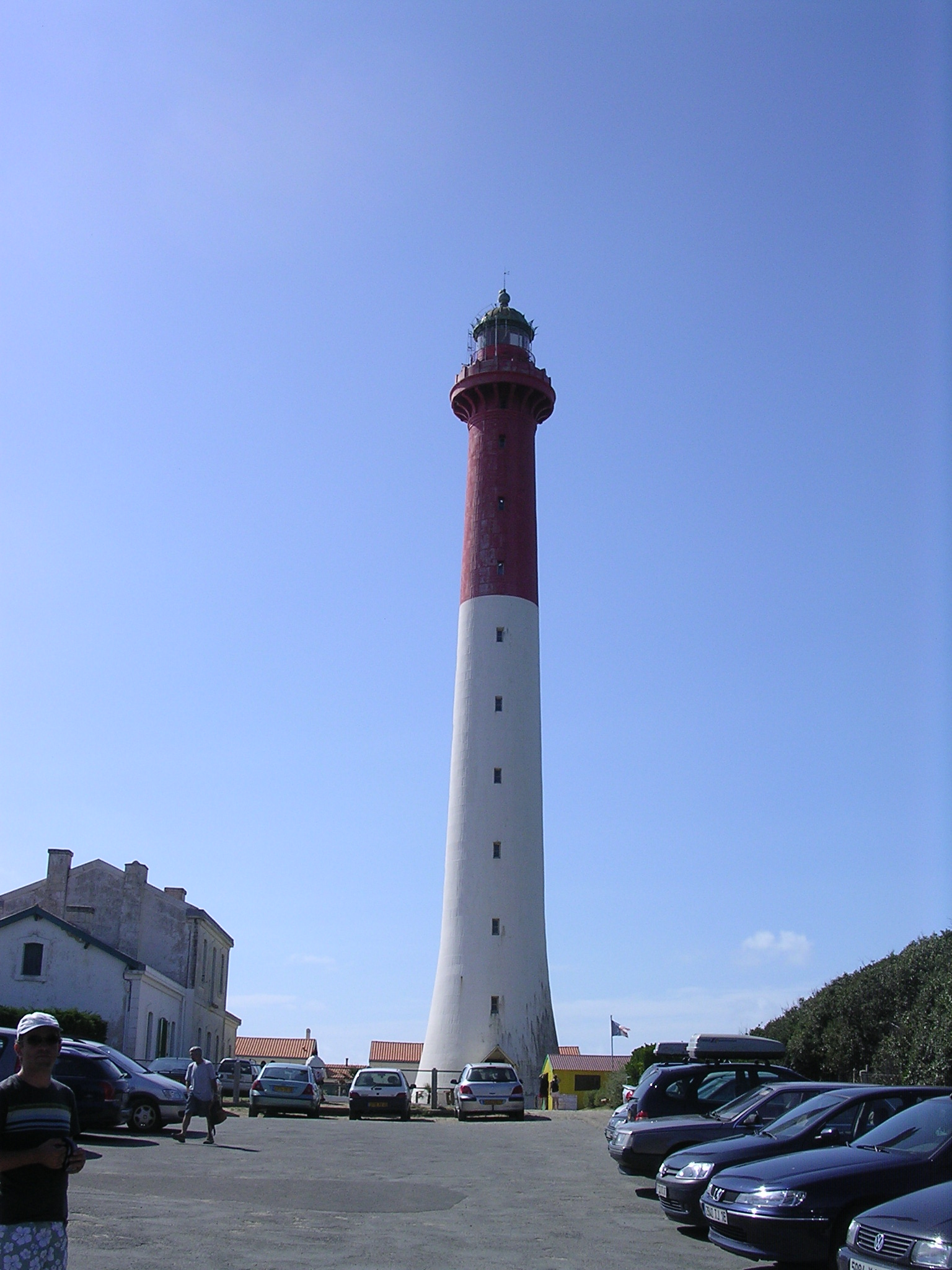
Lighthouse in 2004

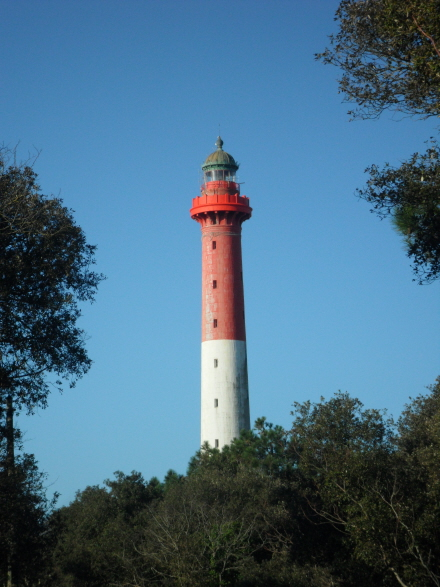
Lighthouse in 2012

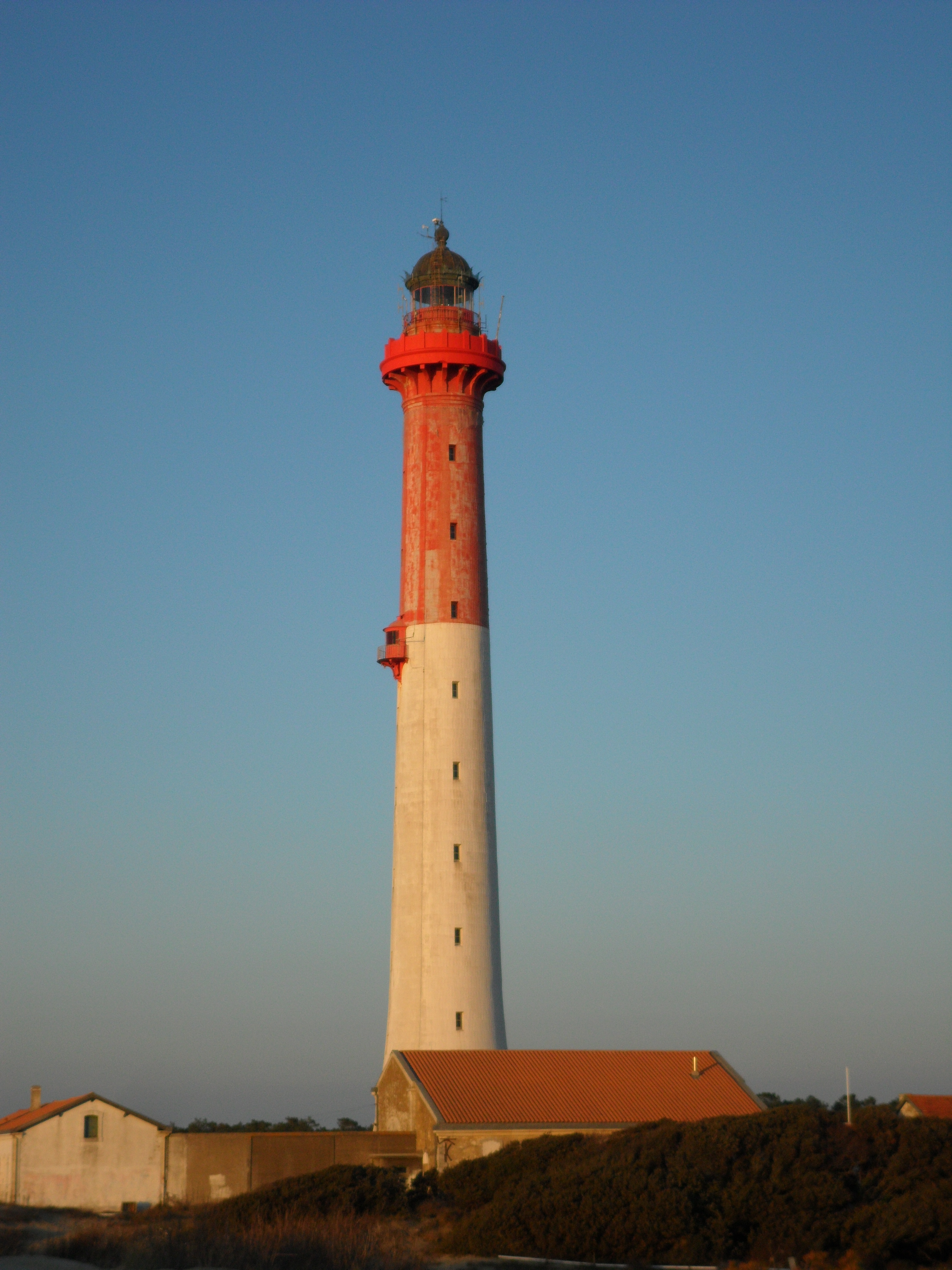
Lighthouse in 2012

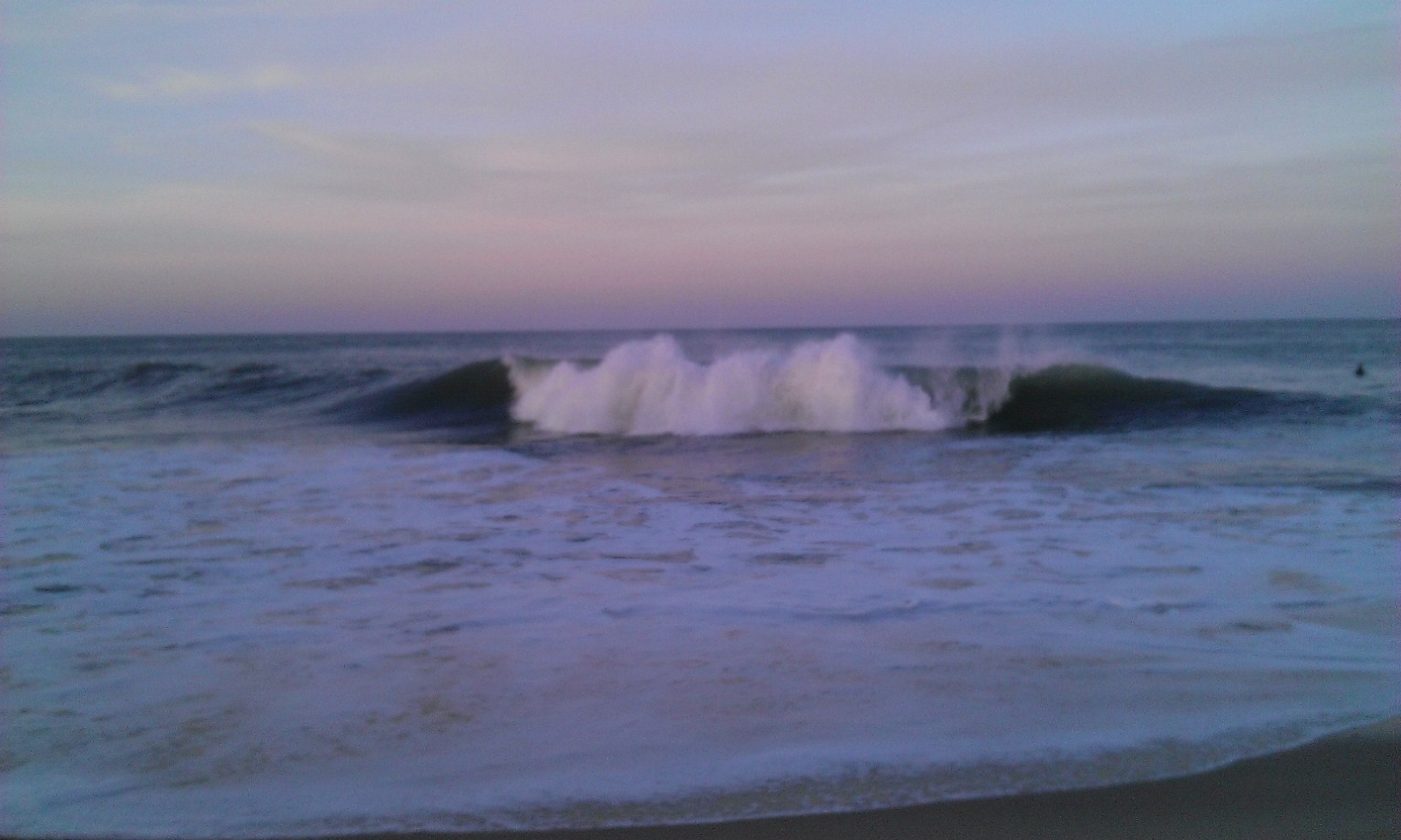
The sea at La Coubre
