= Côte Sauvage (Charente-Maritime) =

Region on the Atlantic coast of France

Coordinates: 45°44′37″N 1°14′32″W

The Côte Sauvage [English: Wild Coast], is in the Charente-Maritime department on the Atlantic coast of France. The Côte Sauvage starts near La Palmyre, north of Royan, and stretches north-west around the point La Tremblade. L’île d’Oléron, France's second-largest island (after Corsica), is just off the Côte Sauvage.
