= La Palmyre Zoo =

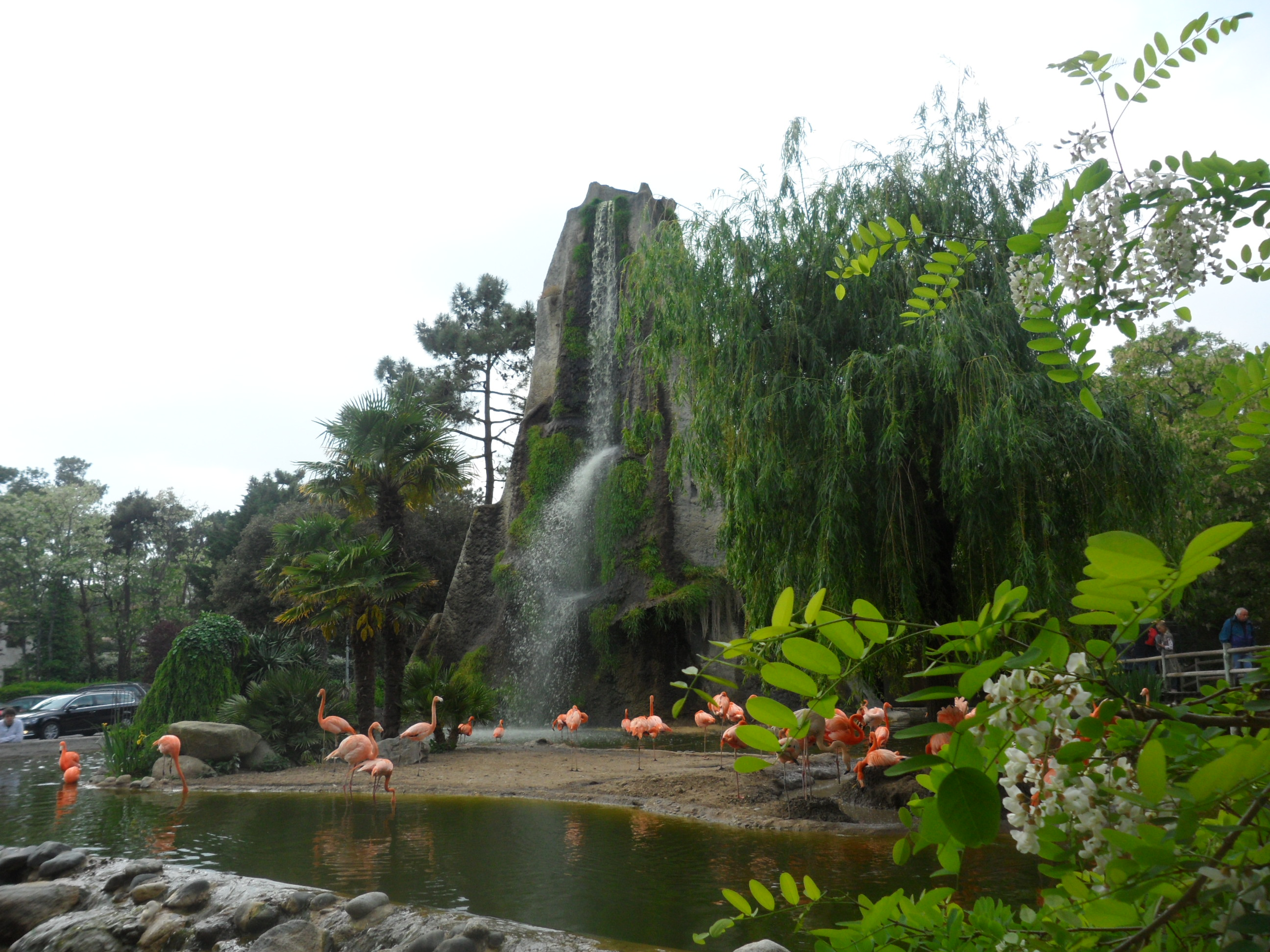
- Interactive map of La Palmyre Zoo
- 45°41′15″N 1°10′1″W
- Date opened: 1966
- Location: Les Mathes, Charente-Maritime
- Land area: 18 ha (44 acres)
- No. of animals: 1600
- No. of species: 145
- Website: www.zoo-palmyre.com/index_flash.html

La Palmyre Zoo (French: Zoo de La Palmyre, French pronunciation: [zo.o də la palmiʁ]) is a zoo in Les Mathes, Charente-Maritime, near Royan, in southwestern France. It was created in 1966 in the forest of la Coubre by Claude Caillé. Extending over 18 hectares (44 acres), including 14 of landscape garden, it offers the visitor the opportunity of observing more than 1600 animals of all kinds, divided into 145 species, over a distance of more than 4 kilometres (2.5 mi).

== History ==
La Palmyre Zoo officially opened its doors in 1966, but the project only began in a semi-official way in 1957, thanks to the efforts of its founder, Claude Caillé.

The son of a newspaperman, with whom he started working at the age of 14, Claude Caillé, in his twenties, met his future wife, Irene, whose brother had a small zoological gardens in Croustille, close to Limoges. It was through his frequent visits helping his brother-in-law that Caillé discovered his passion for animals. Consequently, he became interested and went on to study zoology.

=== A traveling zoo ===
In 1957, accompanied by his wife and their two children, Patrick and Bruno, he began with a small travelling zoo which he exhibited in schools, traveling through France. In the 1960s, he decided to leave for Africa to capture animals. After a stay among Pygmies, he brought gorillas and chimpanzees back from Cameroon.

He left then for Kenya where, helped by Kĩkũyũ, he captured zebras, antelopes and giraffes, but did not have sufficient money to pay the taxes and the transportation for the animals. He then returned to France, but returned three months later with the money necessary. However, the animals entrusted to his team had disappeared, killed meanwhile by Kĩkũyũ. Claude Caillé then took up the school road and rounds for three years.

=== Creation of La Palmyre Zoo ===
On returning to Kenya, he joined Carr-Hartley who captured and provided animals to zoos around the world. This time, the operation succeeded, and he returned to France with a collection of exotic animals, and settled in Palmyre in the heart of a forest of maritime pines and holm oaks, near the coast of the Atlantic Ocean.

In June 1966, the zoo opened its doors with 60 animals spread over three hectares. At the end of August, the park recorded 129,500 visitors. With growing success, the zoo grew and accommodated newcomers. At the time, baby animals abandoned by their mothers were suckled with feeding-bottles. Today, however, in order to avoid denaturing them, the animals are not bottle-fed but by their parents. It is done only in exceptional circumstances, such as abandonment, lack of milk or mother's instinct, or death of the mother.

In 1996, a polar bear exhibit was created, with a capacity of 1,000 cubic metres (35,000 cu ft) of water. Visitors can observe the polar bears on the ground as well as underwater thanks to 5 centimetres (2.0 in) thick glass at the sides of the basin.

In October 2005, Claude Caillé officially retired, and was succeeded by his son, Patrick.

A male 12-year-old Amur tiger left La Palmyre Zoo in June 2006 to join Toundra, a female tiger housed at Amnéville Zoo.

== Incidents ==
In 1976, many animals were evacuated due to a large fire which devastated the forest of Coubre and threatened the zoo, and which died out a few hundred meters from the zoo.

In October 2000, a female cheetah, born in 1992, exhibited salivary and locomotive disorders. Despite all care taken, the general state of the animal degraded. Doctor Thierry Petit was obliged to euthanise it in February 2001. The probe carried out by the French Agency of medical safety of food (AFSSA) of Lyon highlighted the fact that the animal had bovine spongiform encephalopathy (BSE), more commonly known by the name "mad cow disease". It was the first case of BSE in an animal born in France. The animal could have eaten contaminated pieces of meat given to cat-like animals, in addition to their ration containing chicken. It was the only case that affected the zoo.

600 birds at the zoo were vaccinated in 2014 against a new strain of avian influenza that can be transmitted by migrating wild birds. After full containment in late 2014 and the partial containment with biosecurity measures at the beginning of 2015, it became difficult to keep the birds confined in buildings or pens, especially as the tourist season was beginning and therefore vaccination was carried out. The park has previously carried out vaccinations against avian influenza. Certain rare species, such as Bali starlings, from which there are only a few remaining breeding pairs in the world, needed particular care from a possible epizootic of aviary influenza.

The heatwave of the summer of 2006 required setting up special devices for certain animals, in particular, the African penguins, for which an atomiser was installed.

== Conservation and international co-operation ==
La Palmyre Zoo is a member of many recognised international associations, such as:

- The World Association of the zoos and aquariums (WAZA)
- The European Association of the zoos and aquariums (EAZA)
- The National Association of the Zoological Gardens (ANPZ)
- Action for the Safeguarding of Primates of West Africa (WAPCA)

It is also one of the founding members of the Conservation of Species and Animal Populations (CEPA). This association, created in 1997, concentrates its actions on species seriously threatened and generally neglected like leopards and Tahiti monarchs. Particular attention is given to the fauna of the Overseas departments and territories of France.

In 2002, La Palmyre Zoo joined the European Association for the Study and Conservation of Lemurs (AEECL) which includes about fifteen zoos, including zoos in Mulhouse, Cologne and Saarbrücken, as well as the University of Strasbourg. The association manages a programme of European breeding in controlled environments (zoological gardens) and collects funds that are used for creation of a zone protected in Madagascar for blue-eyed black lemurs.

Thanks to its remarkable birth rate, the zoo is able to adhere to many programmes to safeguard species that are threatened and endangered in the wild. In 2006, for example, the zoo took part in 36 European breeding programmes, thus, a quarter of the 130 species housed at the zoo are the subject of an international breeding programme. Among these include gorillas, Bornean orangutans, scimitar oryxes and golden lion tamarins.

== Threatened species ==
=== Scimitar oryxes ===
Hardly less than thirty years ago, the Scimitar oryx occupied the whole of the Sahara Desert. Today, the species is on the brink of extinction, a victim of poaching for its horns and habitat destruction. The last representatives of the species, estimated at thirty individuals, remain in two isolated pockets, one in Chad and the other in Niger. The oryx is the subject of European breeding programs (EEP), of which La Palmyre Zoo is actively involved.

On March 11, 1999, fourteen individuals coming from seven European zoos, including two males raised at La Palmyre, were reintroduced to Tunisia, in the reserve of Sidi Toui, in order to form a reproductive core. Once the newly-introduced animals reach a sufficient number and that the local population will have learned how to coexist with them, they will be released into the desert.

=== Orangutans ===
Orangutans are threatened with extinction, due to loss of their natural habitat, the tropical forests of Sumatra and Borneo. It is estimated that 30 to 50% of the wild populations of orangutans were decimated in the last ten years. Today, the last wild populations remain mostly in protected reserves, in degraded zones subjected to deforestation and agricultural development. To date, the populations of orangutans in their natural habitat were never studied and it is generally believed that they are heading towards extinction.

In addition to its implication in the European programs of breeding, La Palmyre Zoo finances many in situ protection or research programs, i.e. in the countries of origin of the animals, in particular, the programs aiming at protecting the orangutan and also gibbons.

=== Golden lion tamarin ===
In 1992, the zoo sent a family of golden lion tamarins to Brazil within the framework of a rescue operation of the species, threatened since the end of 1960, due to the forestry development and the extension of the human population in Brazil.

In 1995, there were approximately 500 golden lion tamarins in the wild, 125 of them had been reintroduced or had been born to reintroduced individuals. These 125 monkeys lived in 26 groups.

In 1999, the population of animals reintroduced or resulting from reintroduced animals was composed of 43 groups including 302 monkeys. They live in the reserve of Poço das Antas (5500 hectares and more than 20 years of existence) and in 15 private programs.

Today, thanks to the programs of reintroduction carried out by zoos, their population has increased to 1000 individuals, in comparison to hardly 200 in 1970. It is estimated that the optimal capacity of reception of these supervised forests is reached.

=== Asian elephant ===
La Palmyre Zoo has a reproductive bull elephant, Shinto (born in 1969), who arrived on January 25, 1983, from the zoological gardens of Fréjus, like the zoo's two females, Alix (born in 1983) and Malicia (born in 1984), both arrived on January 11, 1991. The first birth of an elephant calf in the zoo was on October 26, 1995, when Alix gave birth to Homaline, followed by Jacky on July 7, 1996, who was transferred to the zoo of Pont-Scorff on October 9, 2001, then to the zoo of Ostrava on October 12, 2004, where it died on March 25, 2005. Maurice was born on June 16, 2001, and Angèle followed a few months later on November 5, 2001. The zoo's latest elephant calf, Ziha, was born on January 27, 2006.

These births are of primary importance for the European breeding program, because they remain rare. In France, since closing for maintenance of the zoological gardens of Vincennes, only La Palmyre Zoo controls the reproduction of its Asian elephants.

Asian elephants are endangered in the wild, and the captive population is difficult to maintain without sufficient manpower. To keep a reproductive male requires installations and a follow-up personnel, which is why few zoological establishments have given up trying to breed elephants in captivity.

=== White rhinoceros ===
In June 2006, La Palmyre Zoo, which has two white rhinoceroses (Whi and Noëlle), joined conservation campaign of the rhinoceros organized by the European Association of Zoos and Aquariums (EAZA), and intended to collect €350,000 in order to finance a minimum of 13 programmes to conserve rhinoceroses in Africa and Asia.

Abundant a few decades ago, white rhinos are threatened by extinction, not only because of habitat destruction, but especially due to poaching for their horns, which, although being made up only of simple keratin, like human hair and fingernails, are very coveted by practitioners of traditional Chinese medicine and for the manufacture of handles for daggers (jambiya) in Yemen. The world's rhino population exceeded more than two million individuals at the turn of the 19th century to 30,000 approximately today, all species together.

La Palmyre Zoo also takes part in research programs undertaken by schools, veterinary surgeons and institutes of research concerning the reproduction of white rhinoceroses.

== La Palmyre Zoo in figures ==
=== Financial aspect ===
Important economic factor for the région Nouvelle-Aquitaine, with 750,000 entries (including 10% from schools) and 9 million € of sales turnover, represents, along with Futuroscope of Poitiers (1,200,000 entries) and La Rochelle Aquarium (850 000 entries) 50% of entries and half of the income of leisure activities in the area. It is the zoological gardens of France with the largest number of visitors.

=== La Palmyre Zoo ===
- 14 hectares arranged;
- 130 species;
- 1600 animals;
- 750 000 paying entries per annum;
- €16 000 necessary each day for the operation of the park;
- 55 employees at the year and 110 in season;
- 9 million € of sales turnover.

=== Food consumed by the animals ===
The 1600 animals of La Palmyre Zoo represent large quantities of food to be fed. For example:

- 250 tons of fodder and 70 tons of straw consumed by the herbivores (giraffes, elephants, antelopes, zebras, rhinos, etc.)
- 180 tons of fresh fruit and vegetables by the chimpanzees, gorillas, orangutans, marmosets, ring-tailed lemurs, lemurs, kangaroos, bats, etc.
- 50 tons of meat by the carnivores (lions, panthers, tigers, jaguars, lynxes, polar bears, etc.)
- 30 tons of food by the flamingos, monkeys, red pandas, etc.
- 20 tons of fish by the sea lions, penguins, polar bears, pelicans, otters, etc.
- 10 tons of various seeds, corn, etc. by the birds (hornbills, macaws, eastern rosellas, turacos, Nicobar pigeons, etc.)

== Activity at the zoo ==
The zoo is open year-round, and is entirely accessible to disabled people. It has free car parking, and offers places to relax and eat inside the park.

=== Attractions ===
In addition to the presentation of several animals in an environment nearest possible to their natural habitat, the zoo offers sea lion shows from April until the end of October, as well as parrot and cockatoo shows.

=== The team of the zoo ===
- Chairman and managing Director: Patrick Caillé
- Veterinary surgeon: Thierry Petit
- Decorator: Nadu Marsaudon
- Architect: Jean Michel Paulet
