= Les Mathes =

- Commune
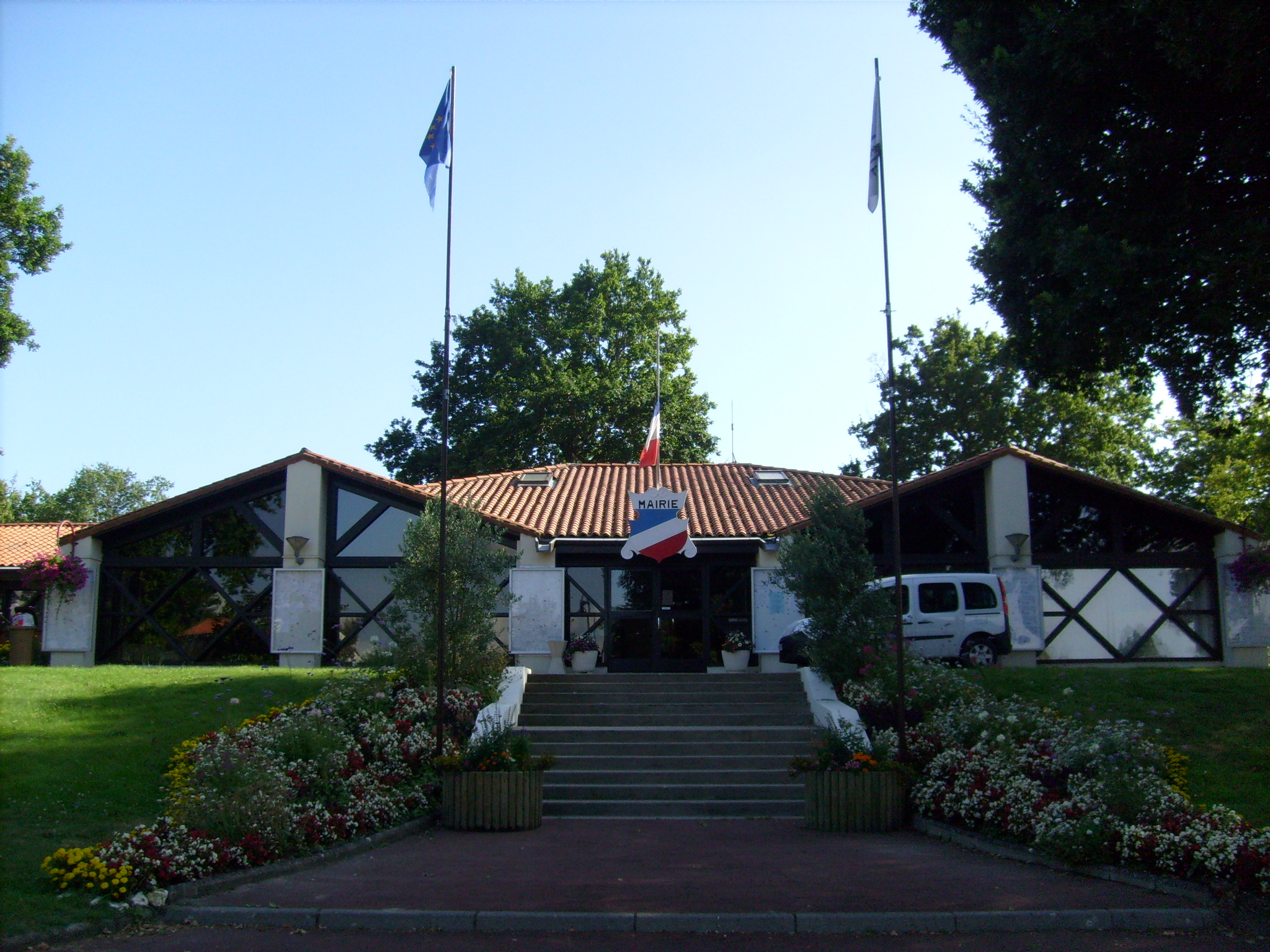
- The town hall in Les Mathes
- Location of Les Mathes
- Location within France Location within Nouvelle-Aquitaine
- Coordinates: 45°43′05″N 1°08′49″W
- Country: France
- Region: Nouvelle-Aquitaine
- Department: Charente-Maritime
- Arrondissement: Rochefort
- Canton: La Tremblade
- Intercommunality: CA Royan Atlantique

Government
  - Mayor (2020–2026): Marie Bascle
- Area^{1}: 34.38 km^{2} (13.27 sq mi)
- Elevation: 35 m (115 ft)
- Highest elevation: 40 m (130 ft)
- Lowest elevation: 0 m (0 ft)
- Population (2023): 2,180
  - Density: 63.4/km^{2} (164/sq mi)
- Time zone: UTC+01:00 (CET)
  - Summer (DST): UTC+02:00 (CEST)
- INSEE/Postal code: 17225 /17570
- ^{1} French Land Register data, which excludes lakes, ponds, glaciers > 1 km^{2} (0.386 sq mi or 247 acres) and river estuaries.

Les Mathes (French pronunciation: [le mat]) is a commune in the Charente-Maritime department and Nouvelle-Aquitaine region in southwestern France.

The commune includes the beach resort La Palmyre, and the Palmyre Zoo.

== Population ==
Historical population

| Year | Pop. | ±% p.a. |
|---|---|---|
| 1793 | 554 | — |
| 1800 | 511 | −1.15% |
| 1806 | 486 | −0.83% |
| 1821 | 510 | +0.32% |
| 1831 | 616 | +1.91% |
| 1836 | 615 | −0.03% |
| 1841 | 700 | +2.62% |
| 1846 | 702 | +0.06% |
| 1851 | 711 | +0.26% |
| 1856 | 746 | +0.97% |
| 1861 | 786 | +1.05% |
| 1866 | 830 | +1.10% |
| 1872 | 831 | +0.02% |
| 1876 | 875 | +1.30% |
| 1881 | 835 | −0.93% |
| 1886 | 829 | −0.14% |
| 1891 | 860 | +0.74% |
| 1896 | 878 | +0.42% |
| 1901 | 889 | +0.25% |

| Year | Pop. | ±% p.a. |
|---|---|---|
| 1906 | 880 | −0.20% |
| 1911 | 854 | −0.60% |
| 1921 | 795 | −0.71% |
| 1926 | 754 | −1.05% |
| 1931 | 732 | −0.59% |
| 1936 | 772 | +1.07% |
| 1946 | 878 | +1.29% |
| 1954 | 794 | −1.25% |
| 1962 | 806 | +0.19% |
| 1968 | 836 | +0.61% |
| 1975 | 898 | +1.03% |
| 1982 | 1,005 | +1.62% |
| 1990 | 1,205 | +2.29% |
| 1999 | 1,452 | +2.09% |
| 2007 | 1,675 | +1.80% |
| 2012 | 1,741 | +0.78% |
| 2017 | 1,974 | +2.54% |
| 2023 | 2,180 | +1.67% |

Source: EHESS and INSEE (1968-2023)

== Gallery ==
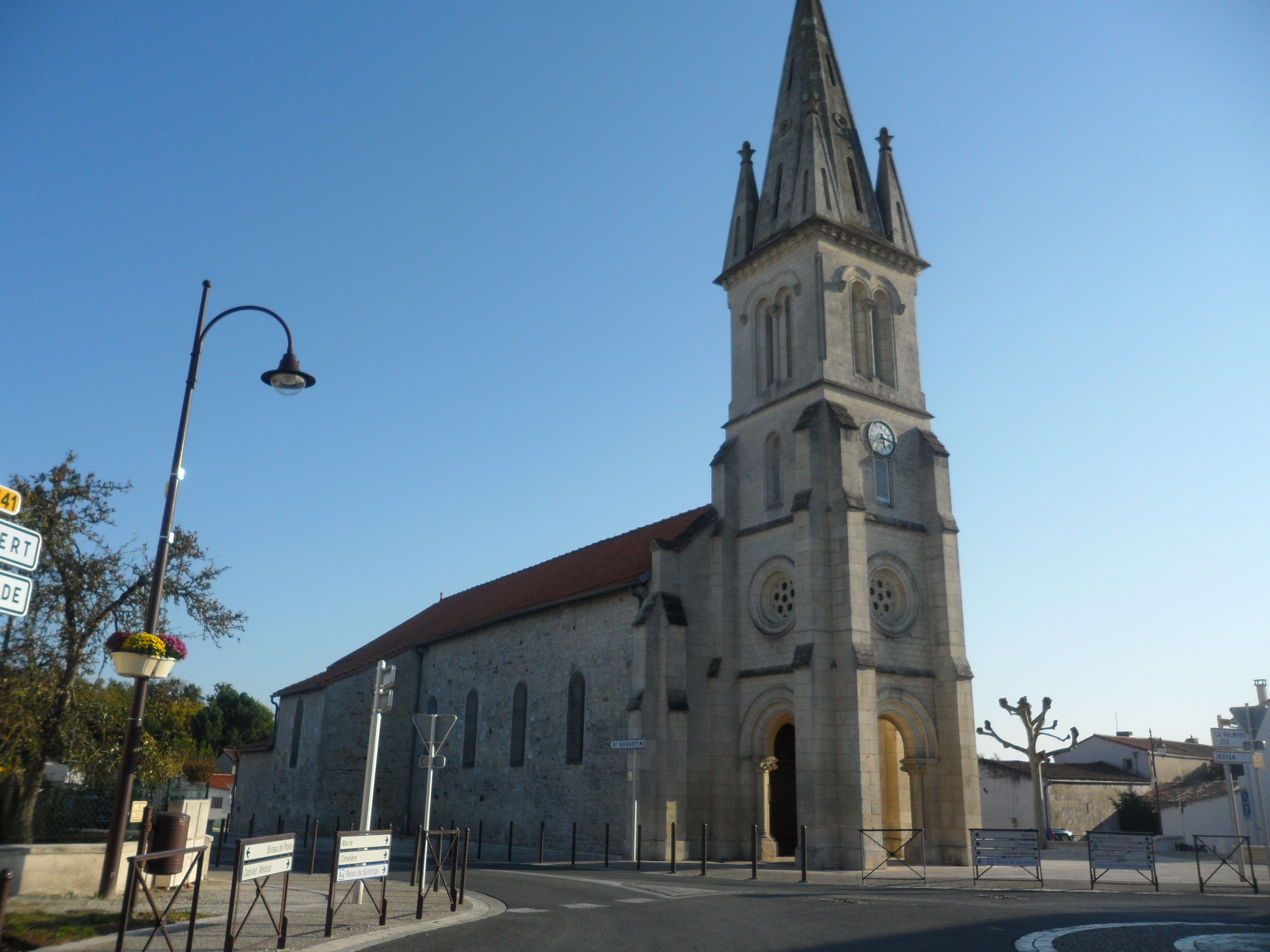

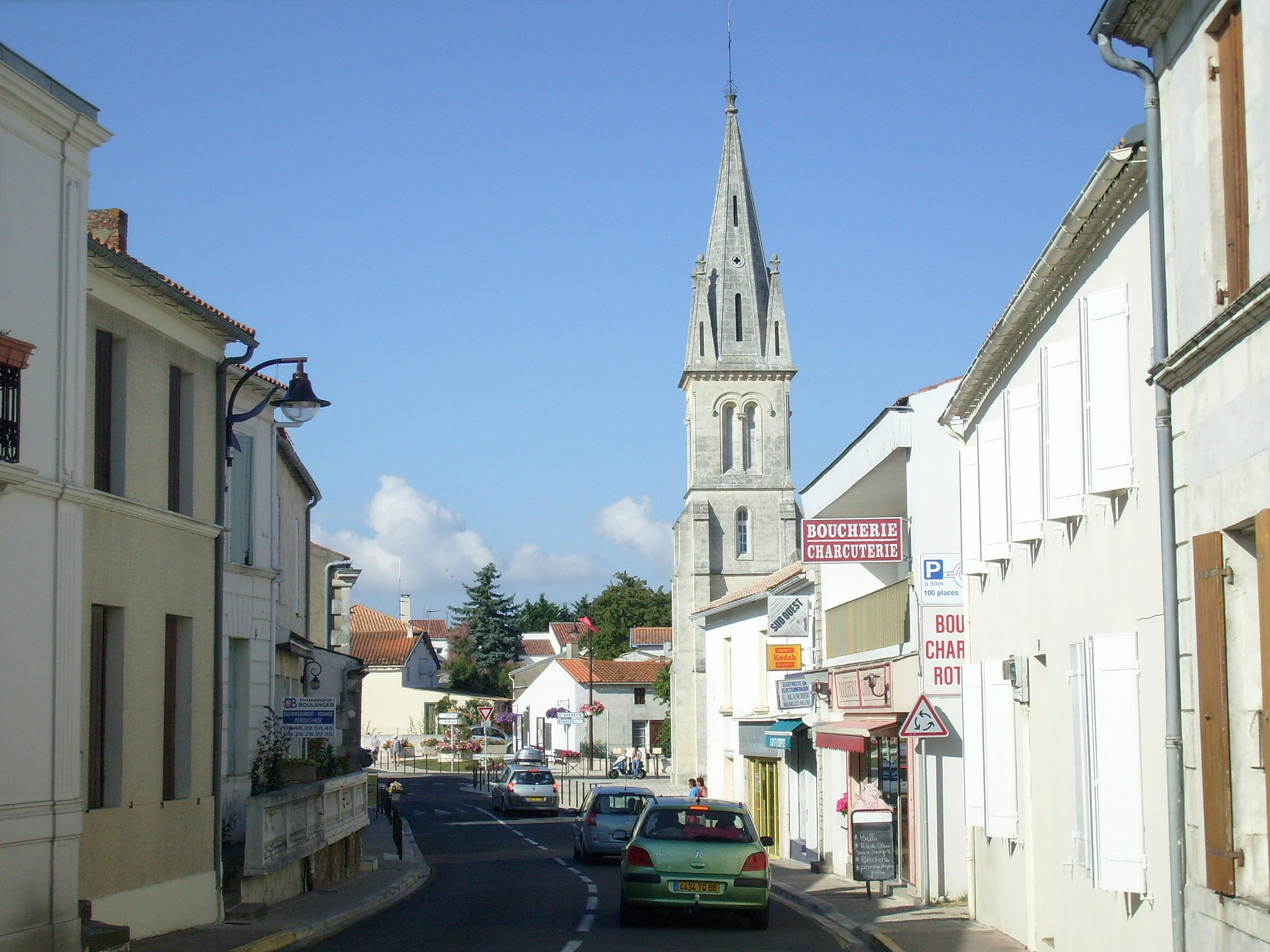

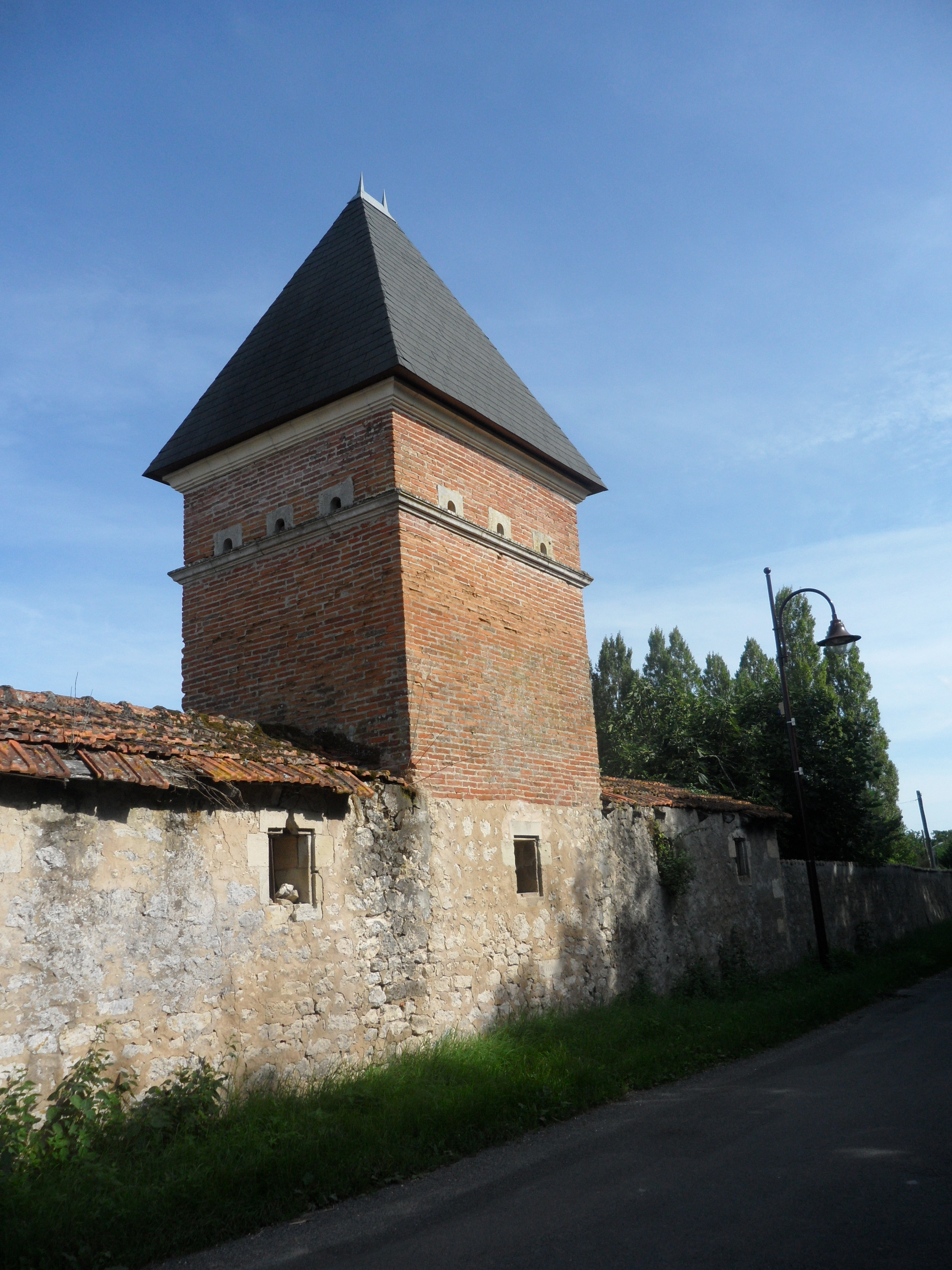

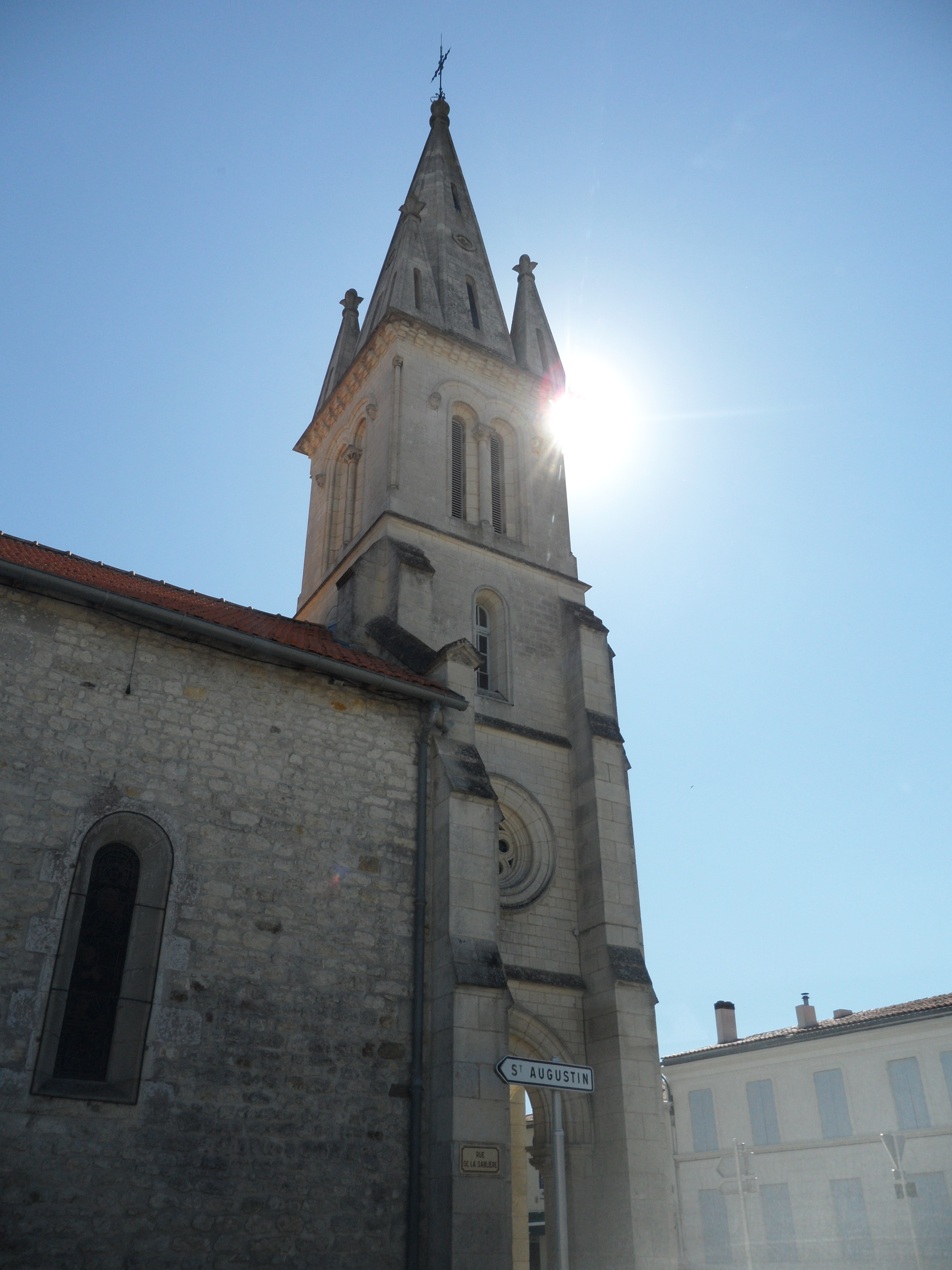

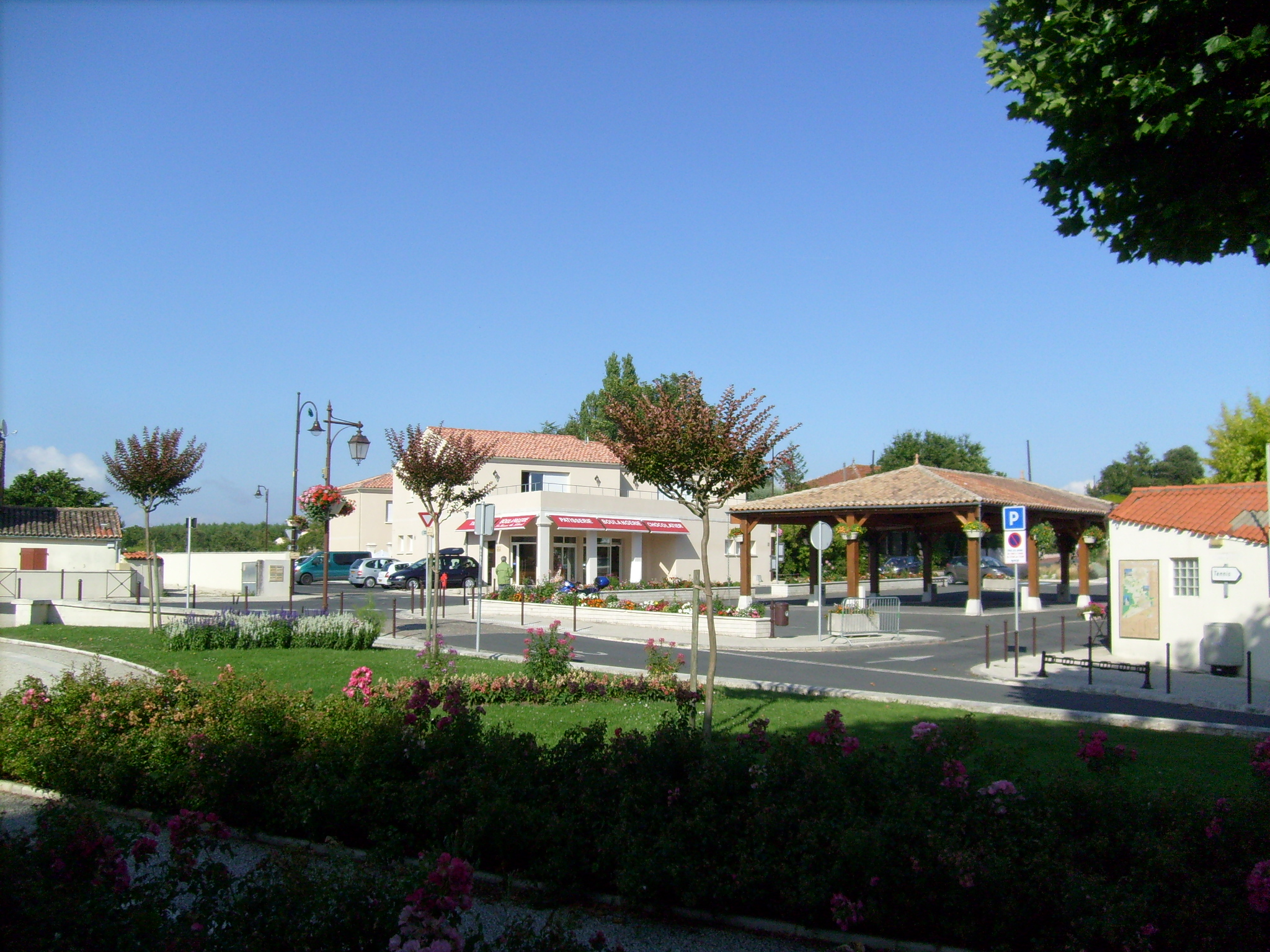

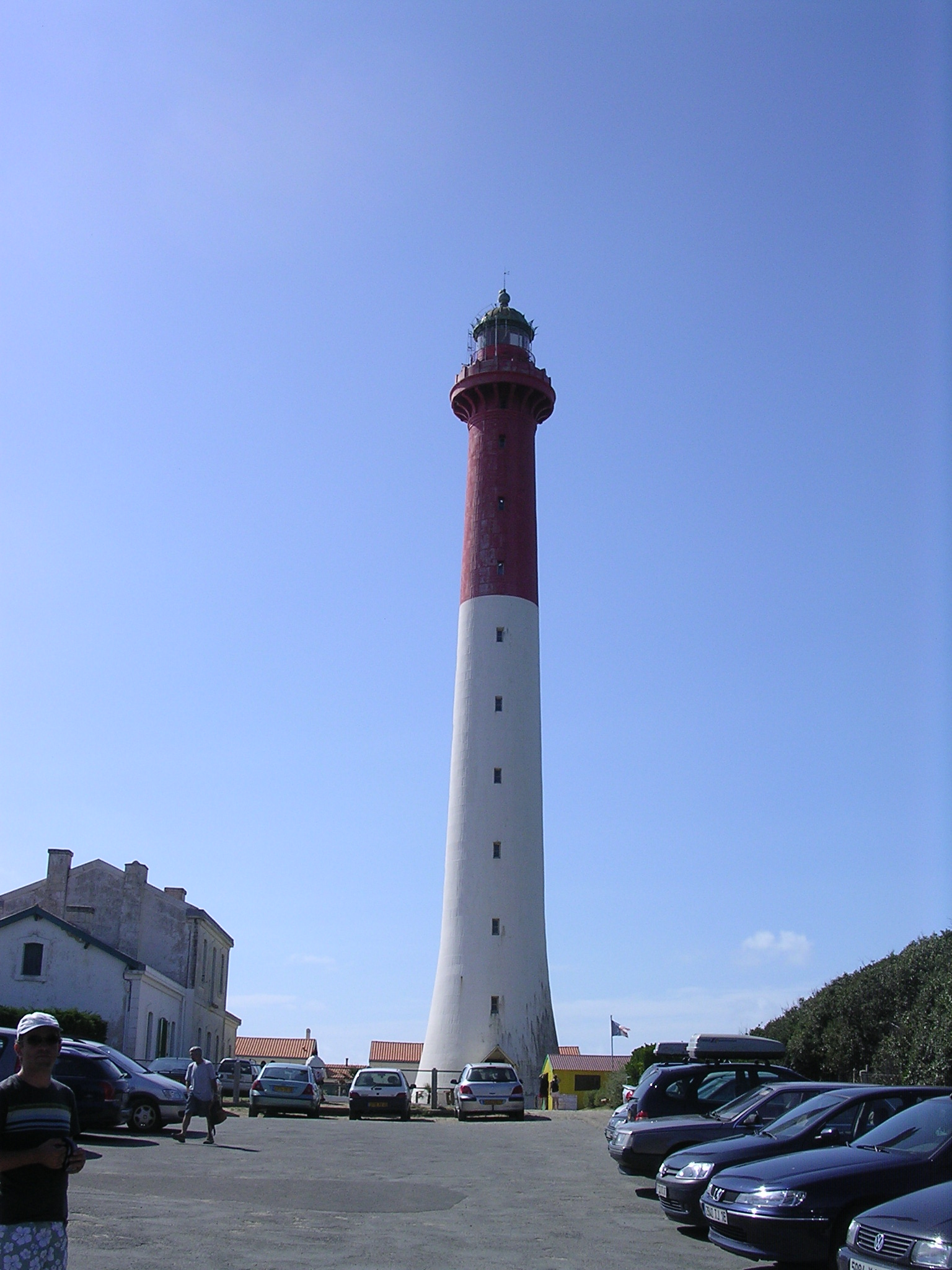

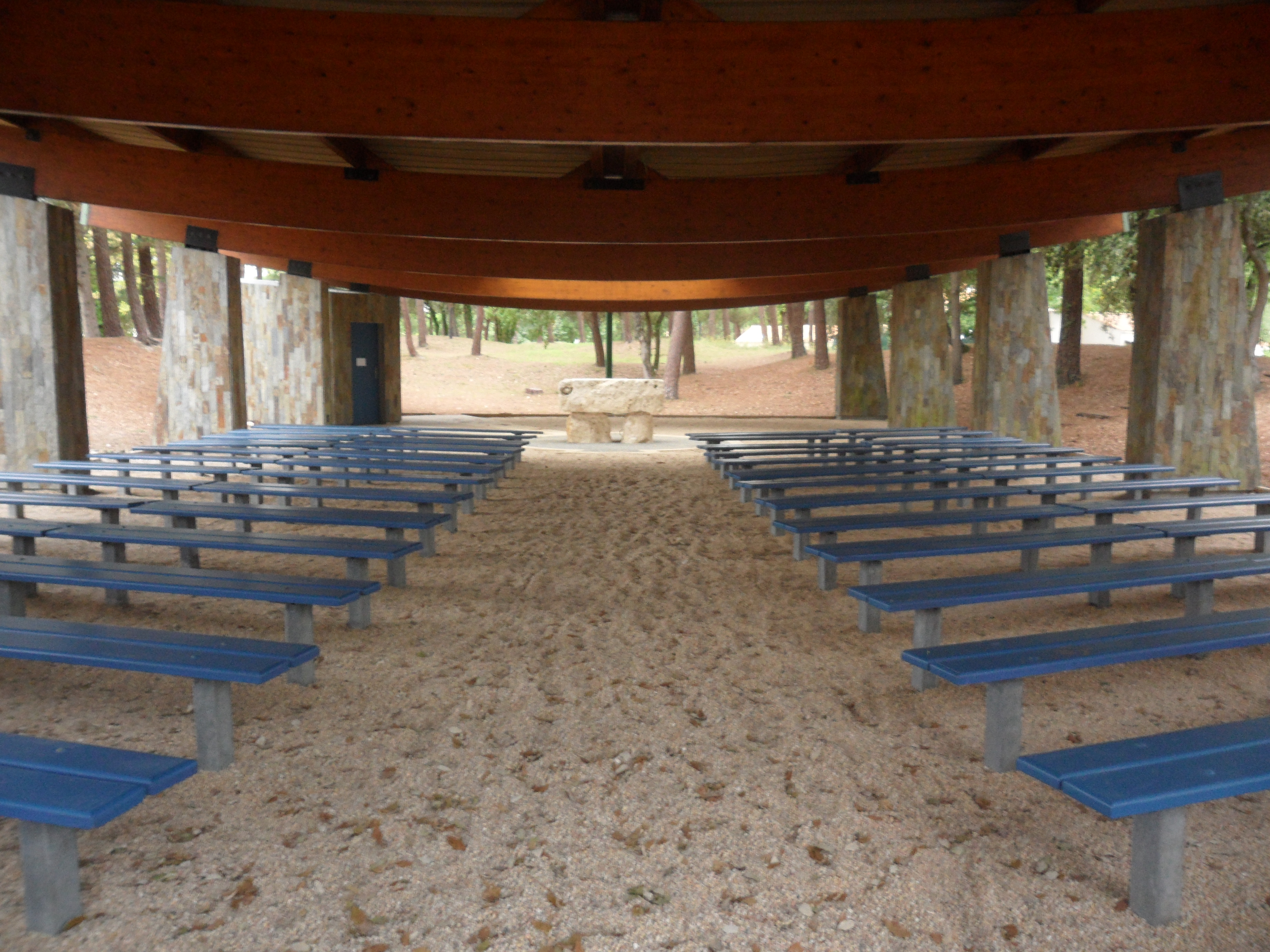

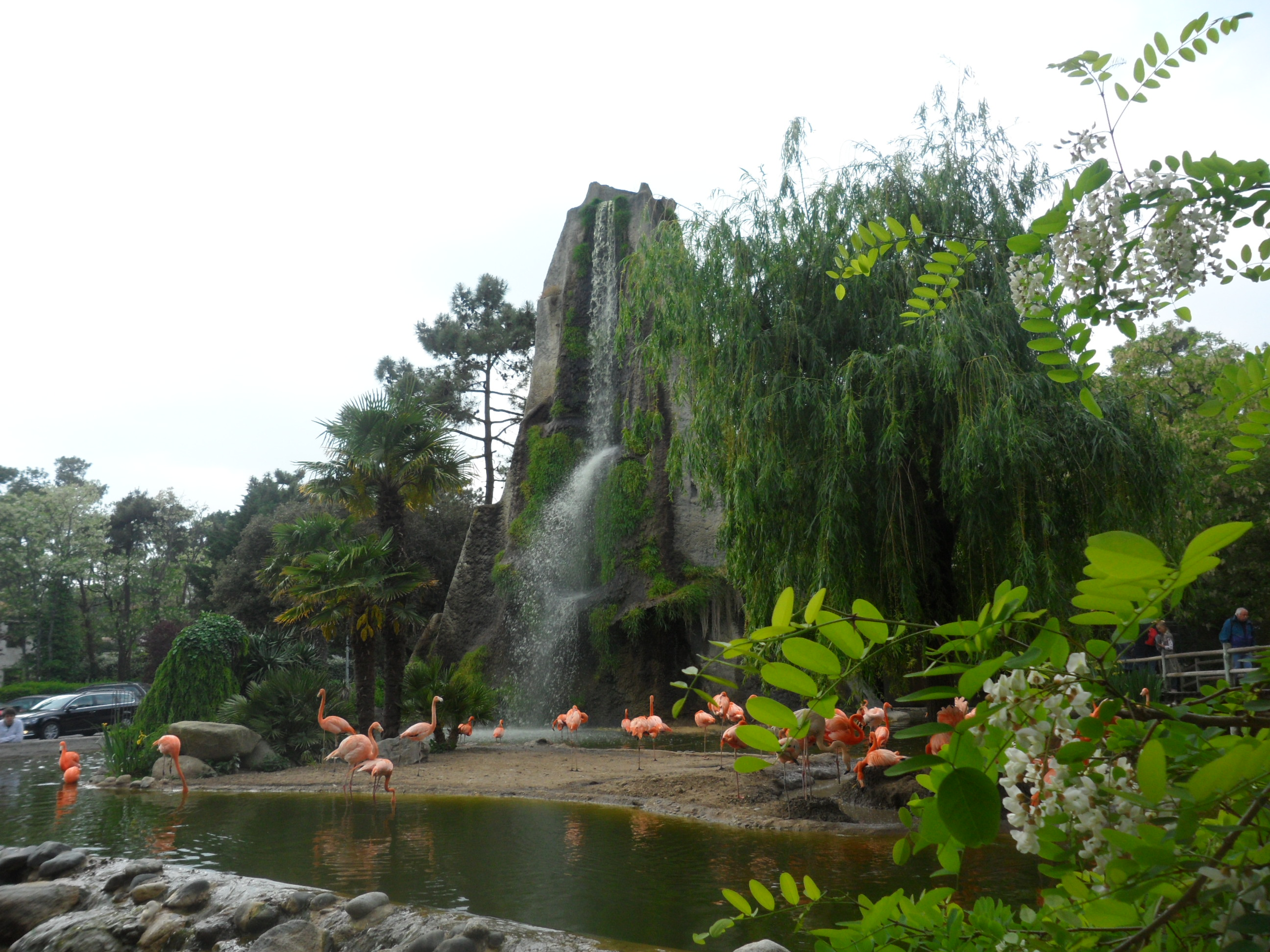

== See also ==
- Communes of the Charente-Maritime department
