= La Tremblade =

- Commune
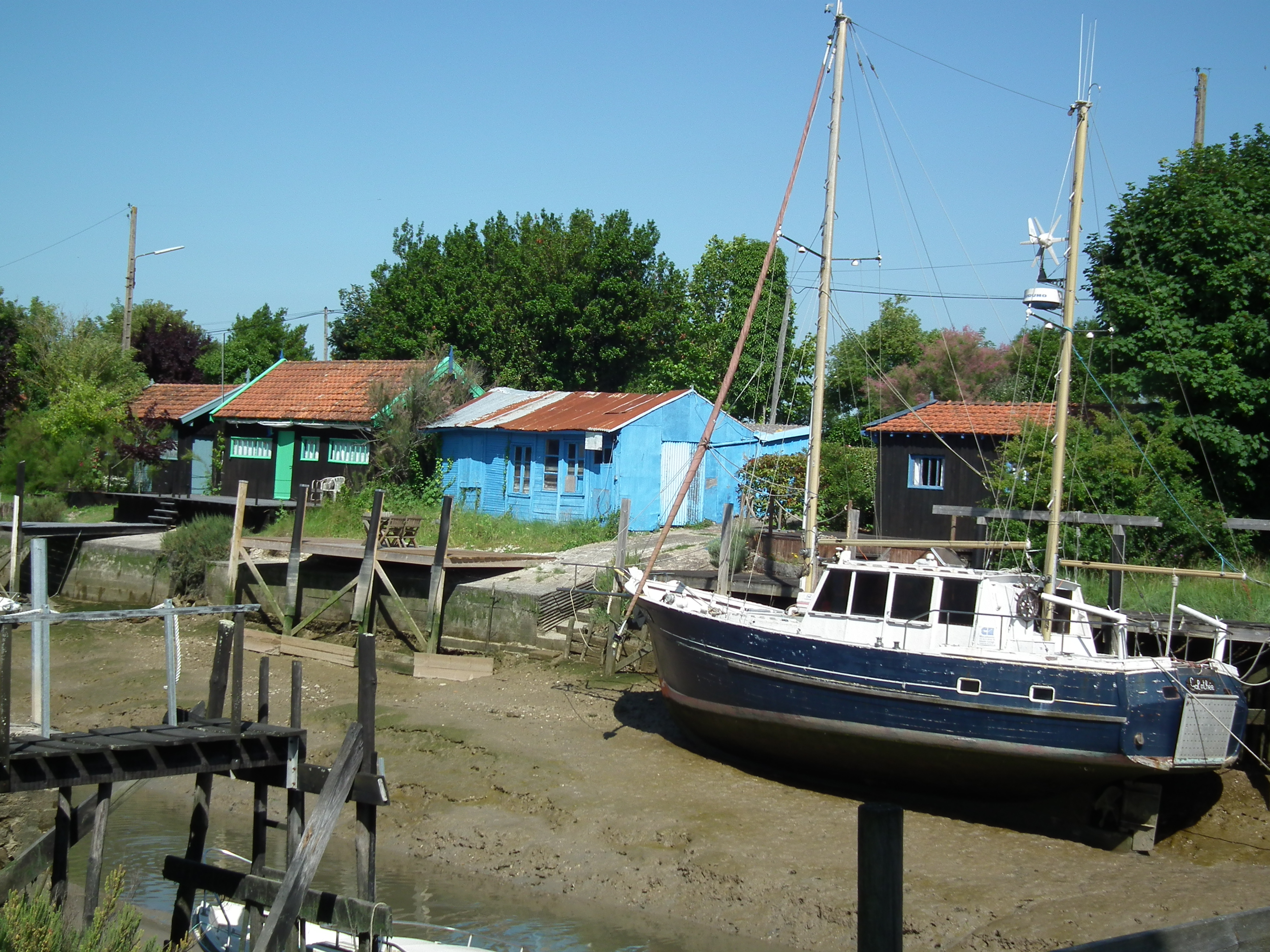
- The port of La Tremblade

- Coat of arms
- Location of La Tremblade
- Location within France Location within Nouvelle-Aquitaine
- Coordinates: 45°46′10″N 1°08′30″W
- Country: France
- Region: Nouvelle-Aquitaine
- Department: Charente-Maritime
- Arrondissement: Rochefort
- Canton: La Tremblade
- Intercommunality: CA Royan Atlantique

Government
  - Mayor (2020–2026): Laurence Osta Amigo
- Area^{1}: 69.13 km^{2} (26.69 sq mi)
- Highest elevation: 56 m (184 ft)
- Lowest elevation: 0 m (0 ft)
- Population (2023): 4,650
  - Density: 67.3/km^{2} (174/sq mi)
- Time zone: UTC+01:00 (CET)
  - Summer (DST): UTC+02:00 (CEST)
- INSEE/Postal code: 17452 /17390
- ^{1} French Land Register data, which excludes lakes, ponds, glaciers > 1 km^{2} (0.386 sq mi or 247 acres) and river estuaries.

La Tremblade (French pronunciation: [la tʁɑ̃blad]) is a commune in the Charente-Maritime department and Nouvelle-Aquitaine region of southwestern France.

== Toponymy ==
The name of the town probably derives from the presence of aspen trees (French: tremblers) in the forests of the region during the Middle Ages

== Environment ==
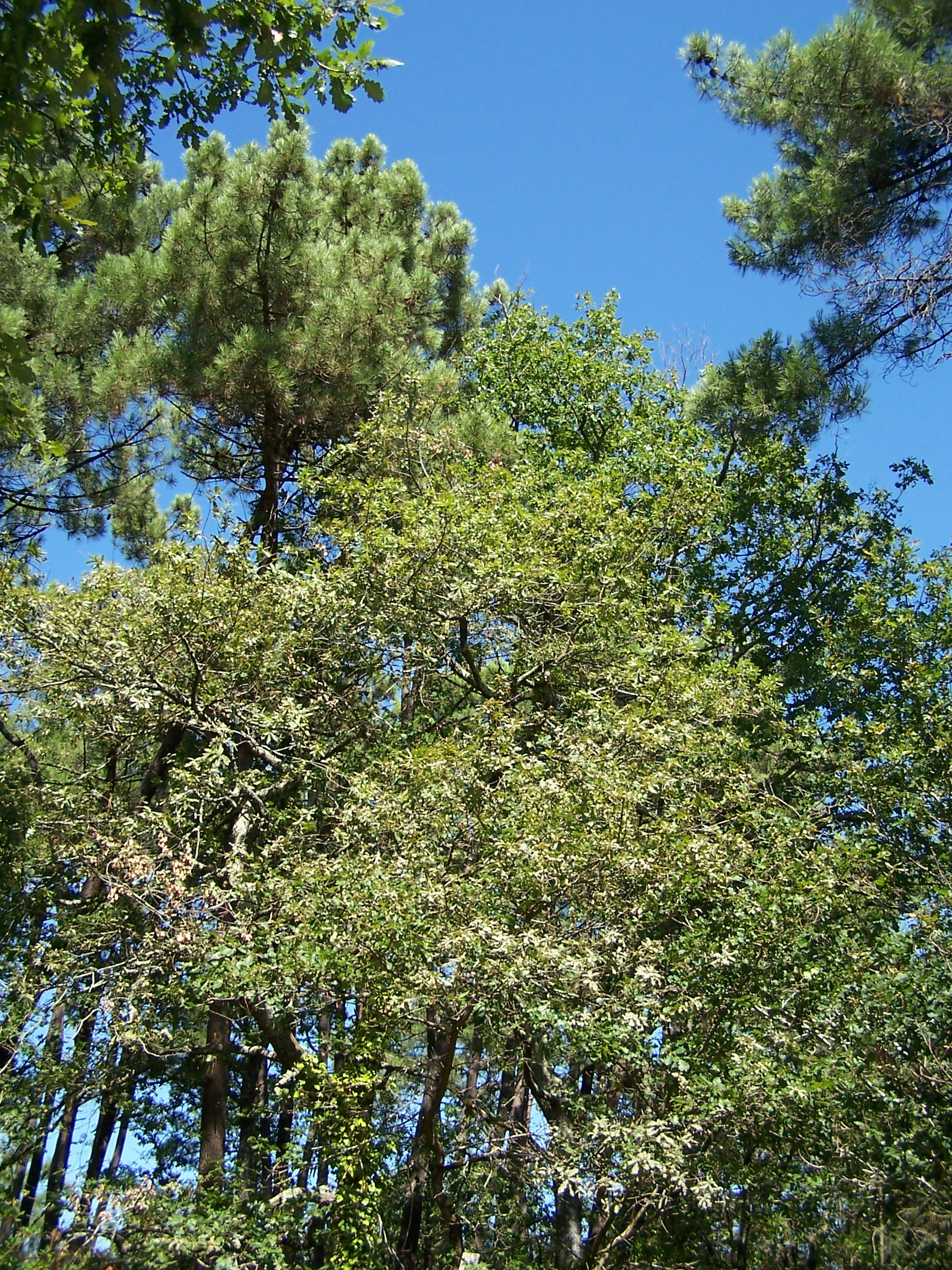
Pins maritimes in the forest of La Coubre.

Perfumed by the smell of resin, the forest is in spring all fragrant with the scent of broom and gorse whose bright yellow form with green trees a symphony of colors. What a charming hiking, tasting long solitary walks than winning Ronce-les-Bains by La Coubre forest, Louis Desgraves, Saintonge.

La Tremblade consists of 78% forest and semi-natural areas (forest of La Coubre essentially), with the rest of the territory being divided between wetlands (9%), agricultural land (6%) and artificialized (6%).

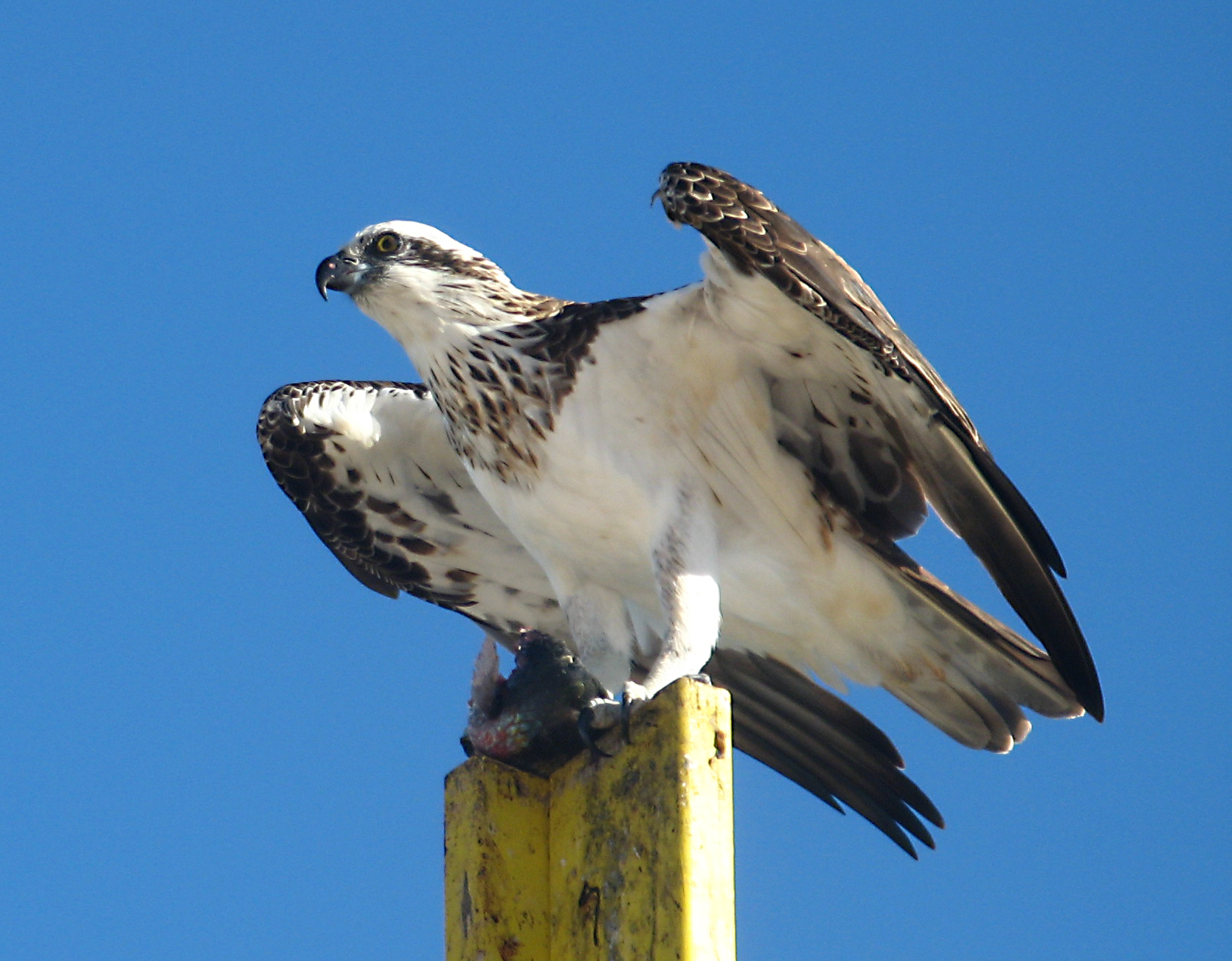
The Osprey comes to nest in Arvert peninsula.

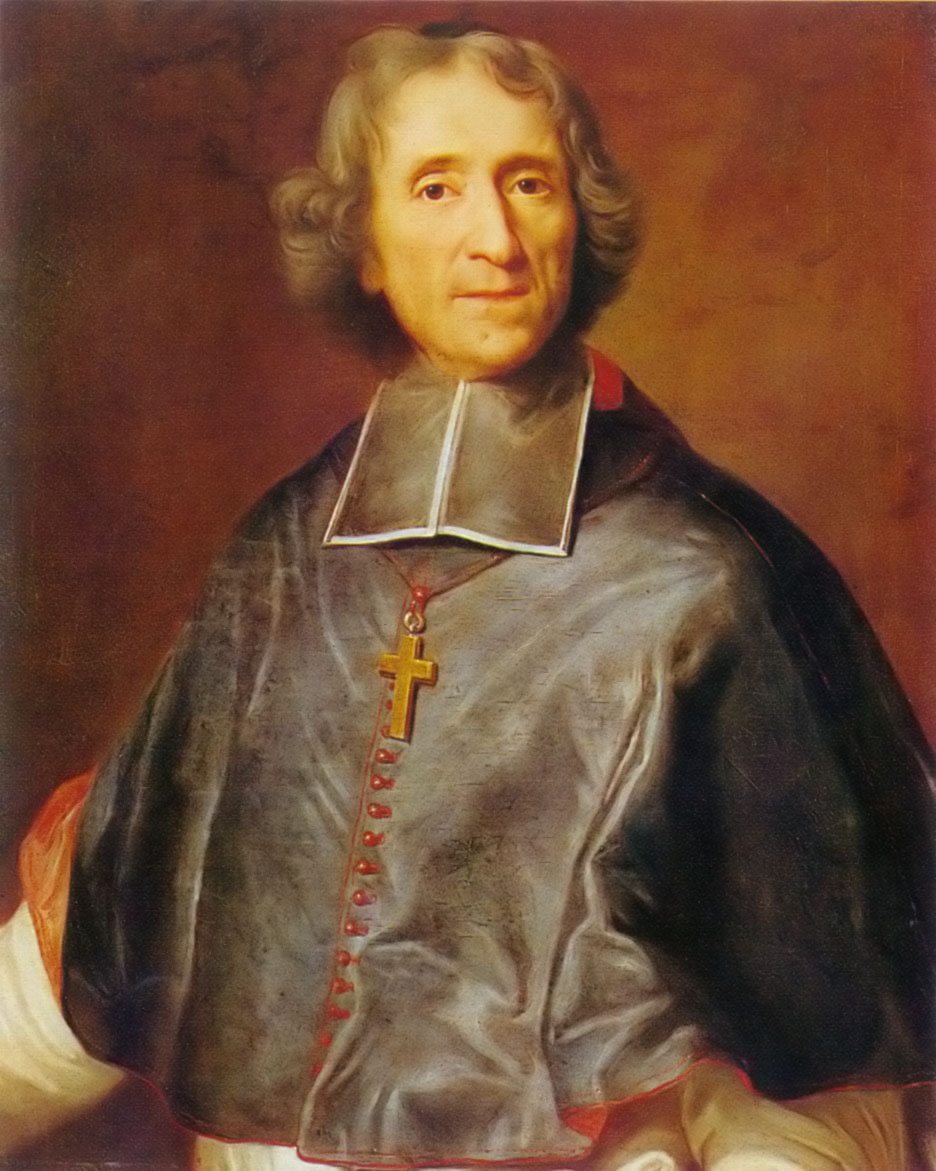
Fénelon is deployed to Arvert in 1686 to "reason" Protestants.

== Bastion of Protestantism ==
In the 16th century, Protestantism took hold in the provinces of Aunis and Saintonge. Men like Philibert Hamelin (founder of the Reformed Churches in the municipalities of Arvert and Oléron) organised the nascent communities.

The authorities reacted inconsistently. There were periods of relative tolerance and successive waves of persecution. Philibert Hamelin was arrested in 1557, strangled and burned. During the religious wars, terror changed sides and Catholics came under attack. The monasteries of La Garde and the Crown were ransacked, the monks dispersed and monastic lands leased. These fratricidal wars ended with the enactment of the Edict of Nantes. After the series of conflicts, village populations were almost entirely Protestant.

In the 17th century and 18th century, La Tremblade's port was a hub for the provisioning of ships bound for New France. It was also the base for ships fishing the Newfoundland banks" (Colbert album). Several shipyards were located there, including those of the French Royal Navy. Ships such as "La Renommé" of Commondant Foran (1662) or "Le Grand" of Captain Jehan Lestrille (1675) were refitted there, and François de Vendôme, Duke of Beaufort, prepared his ships for his expeditions to Africa at La Tremablade.

Louis XIV wanted to establish an arsenal in the area, but dangerous currents at Oléron caused Colbert to choose another site: a small village in the middle of the marsh, about twenty kilometres to the north, which ultimately became the city of Rochefort.

Oyster farming was established in 1650 by Charles and Blanche Chapeleine. Green oysters from the Isles of Arvert became a delicacy. Eaten raw or marinated, they were prized by King Louis XIV and the French nobility. This activity remains restricted to the port and salt marshes.

An order in 1681 to close Protestant temples (churches) opened the way for further persecution of Protestants. Solemn processions were held in the presence of local officials (and the Intendant of Aunis, that same year). The faithful of the "RPR" (Reformed Religion) were urged to convert to the "true faith." Many refused and were exiled. The exodus was such that Fénelon was sent to the area to try to reason with the "lost sheep". His mission, which began on 6 February 1686, ended in total failure. The authorities decided to employ a more radical tactic: sending dragoons (Dragonnades) to harass and intimidate Protestants into converting to Catholicism or leaving France.

== Development ==
In the 18th century, due to a reversal of the demographic trend, the village, which was not even a full-fledged parish, had a larger population than the capital of the Barony on which it depended, Arvert. The village was emancipated in 1749 by becoming an independent parish, and in 1758, Jean Charles de Saint-Nectaire, Baron of Arvert, transferred his stately home, La Tremblade. The way was paved for the village, which has about 2000 inhabitants at the eve of the Revolution, to become capital of the newly created district in 1790. A section of the patriotic society of "Friends of the Constitution" (official name of Jacobins), was organised there as in many towns and villages of France. It opened a "Temple of Freedom" the 27 December 1791. In 1794, during the Terror, the Marquis de Conflans, last lord of Arvert and La Tremblade, was forced to give his estate to the Republic.

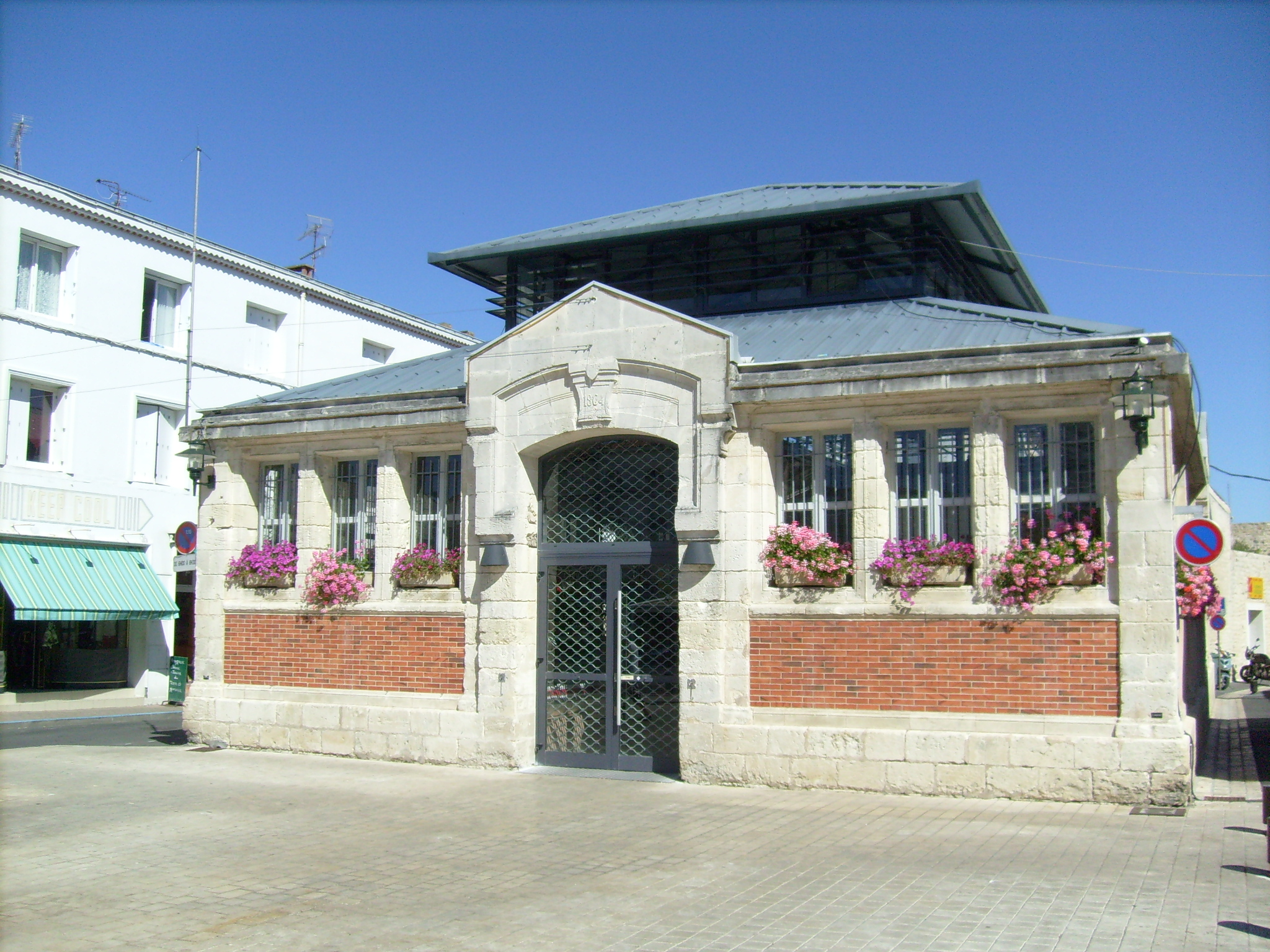
The halls constructed in 1864.

During the 19th century, the city gained a church, temple, covered market and railway, and became an important economic centre of the department. The oyster revolutionised the local economy based on fishing, agriculture (production of wheat, maize and rye), wine (white wine production, brandy and vinegar) and it was also turning more and more towards tourism. In 1876, La Tremblade was classified as the fifth-largest port in France after La Rochelle, with an estimated traffic of 8300 tonnes (oysters, salt, fish products ).

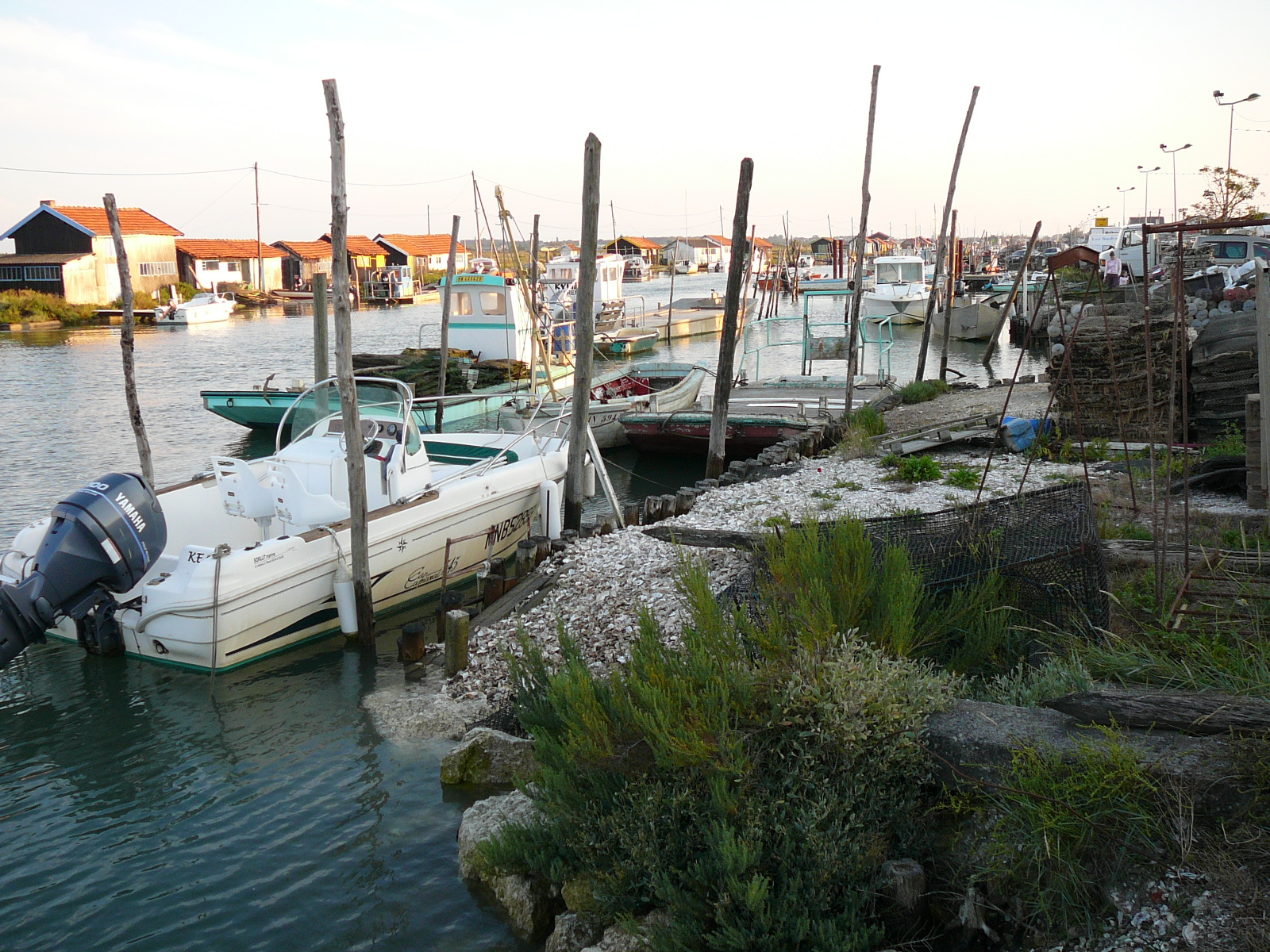
La Temblade strike

Many villas were built on the edge of the ocean, west of the town, in a grid pattern established by Joseph Edward Perraudeau of Beaufief, one of the first being the Villa "Stork", built in 1860, the genesis of the future seaside district of Ronce-les-Bains. In 1862, a Parisian physician, Dr. Brochard, publishes a brochure entitled The sea baths in La Tremblade contributing to the development of the resort.

In 1940, the city was occupied by German troops. During their withdrawal in February 1945, they burned the city centre, before retreating to a redoubt in the forest of Coubre. The Allies (158th Infantry Regiment) landed at the Mus-de-loup on 14 April 1945 and liberated the city,

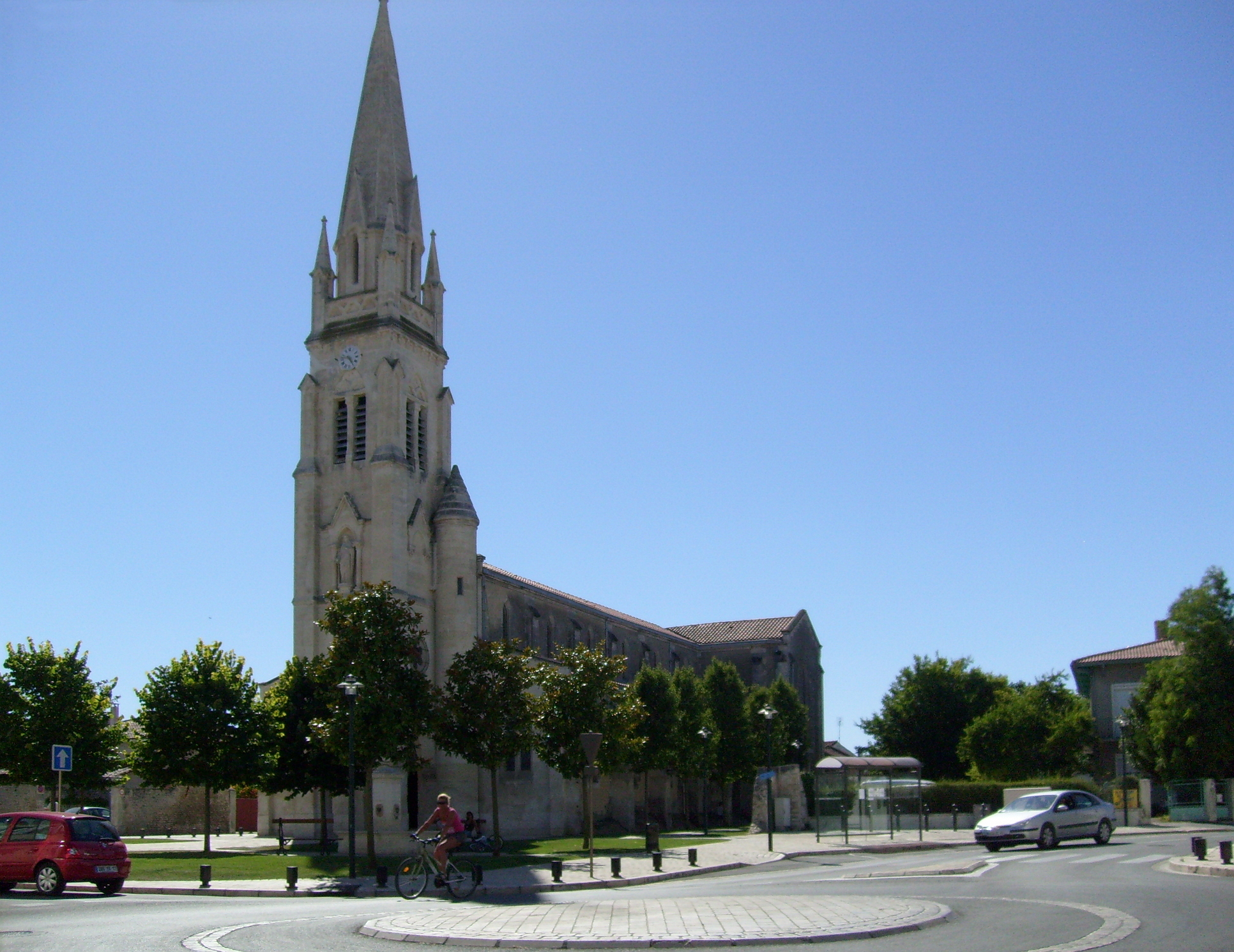

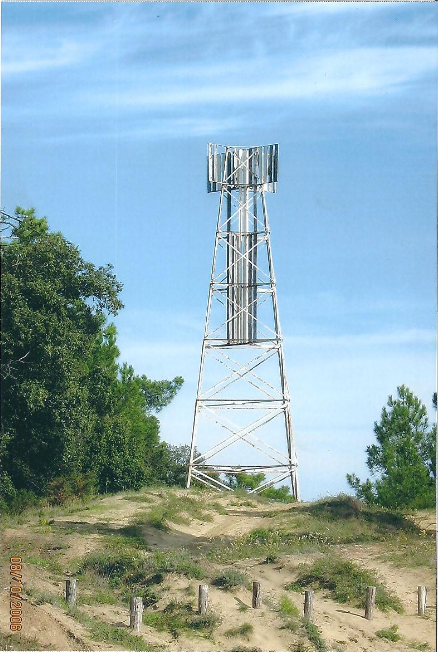

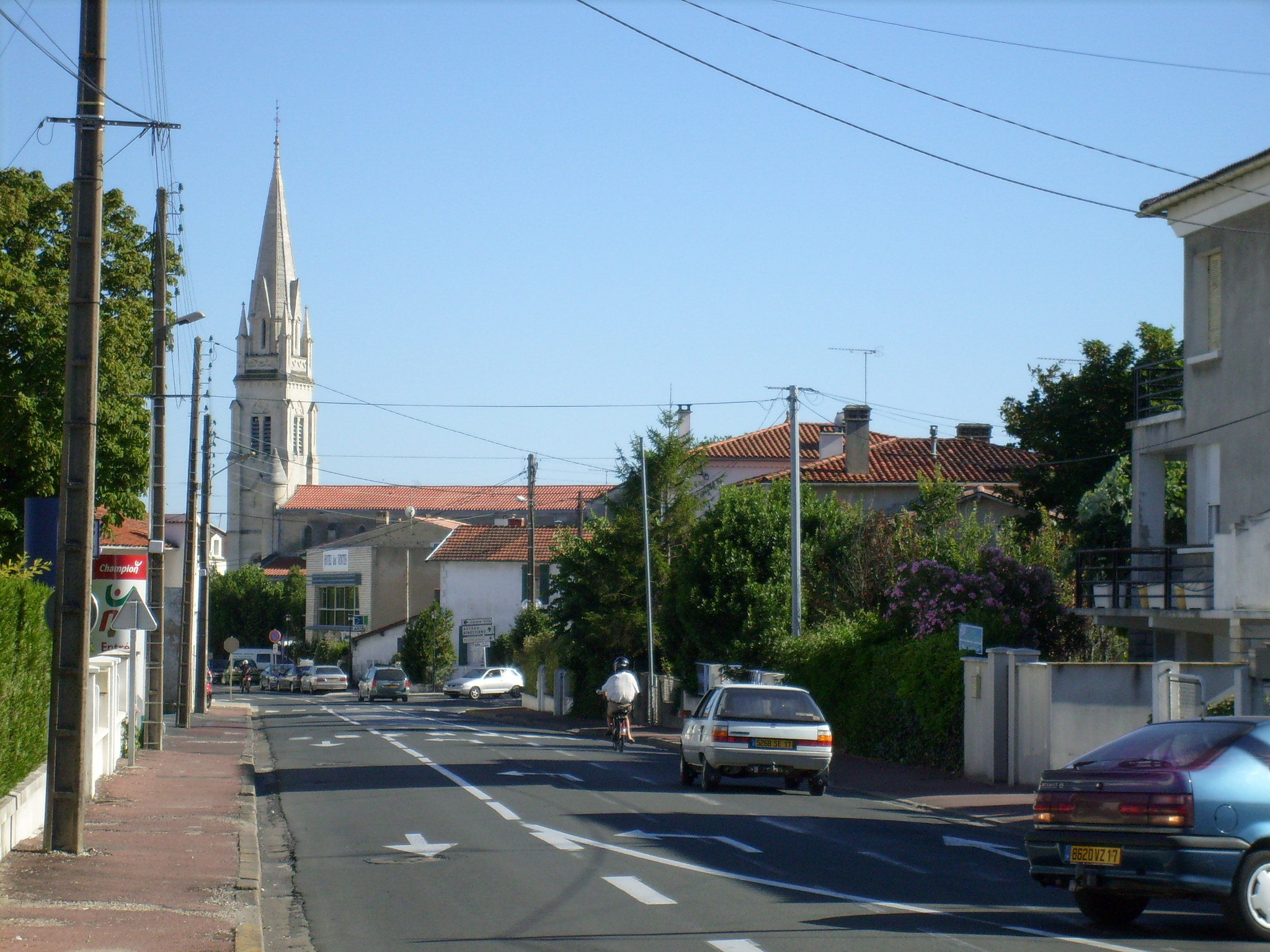

== Lighthouse ==
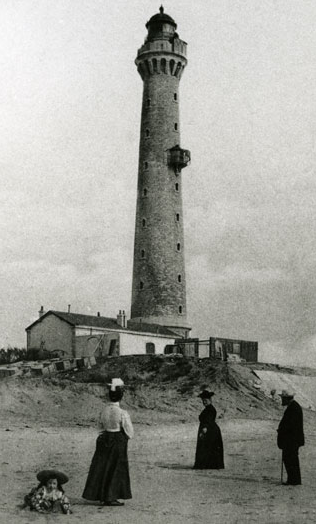
The old lighthouse c.1900

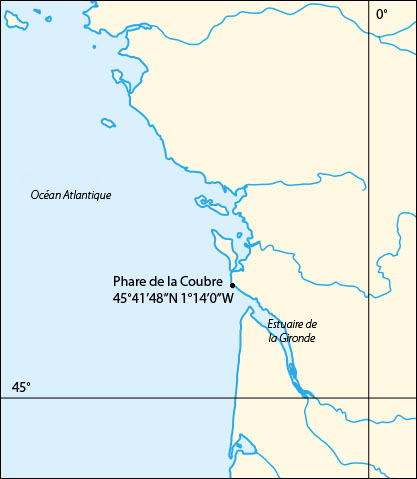
Location of the La Coubre lighthouse

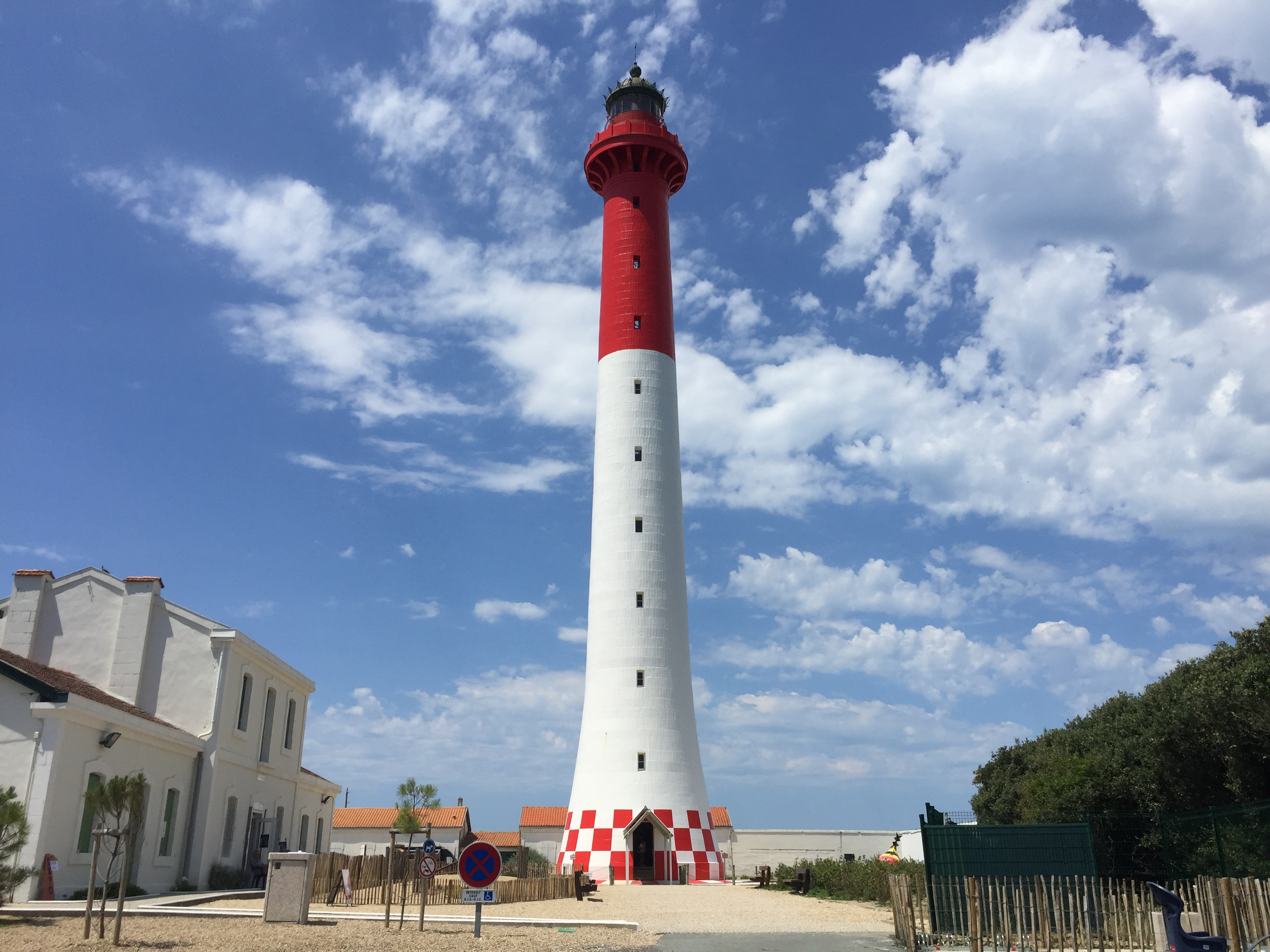
La Coubre lighthouse

Several temporary lighthouses were established during the 19th century, all undermined by the sea. An imperial decree of 12 May 1860 ordered the establishment of a lighthouse on the north bank of the Gironde estuary, because of the many shipwrecks, although it was not until 1895 that a stone lighthouse 57 metres high was erected. The building collapsed in May 1907 due to erosion by the sea.

The La Coubre Lighthouse, whose construction was decided in October 1904, was commissioned in 1905. Purposely built 1800 meters from the shore, the rapid erosion of the sandbanks in the estuary meant that by 2010 it was only 150 meters from the high-tide mark. It has many cracks and leaks.

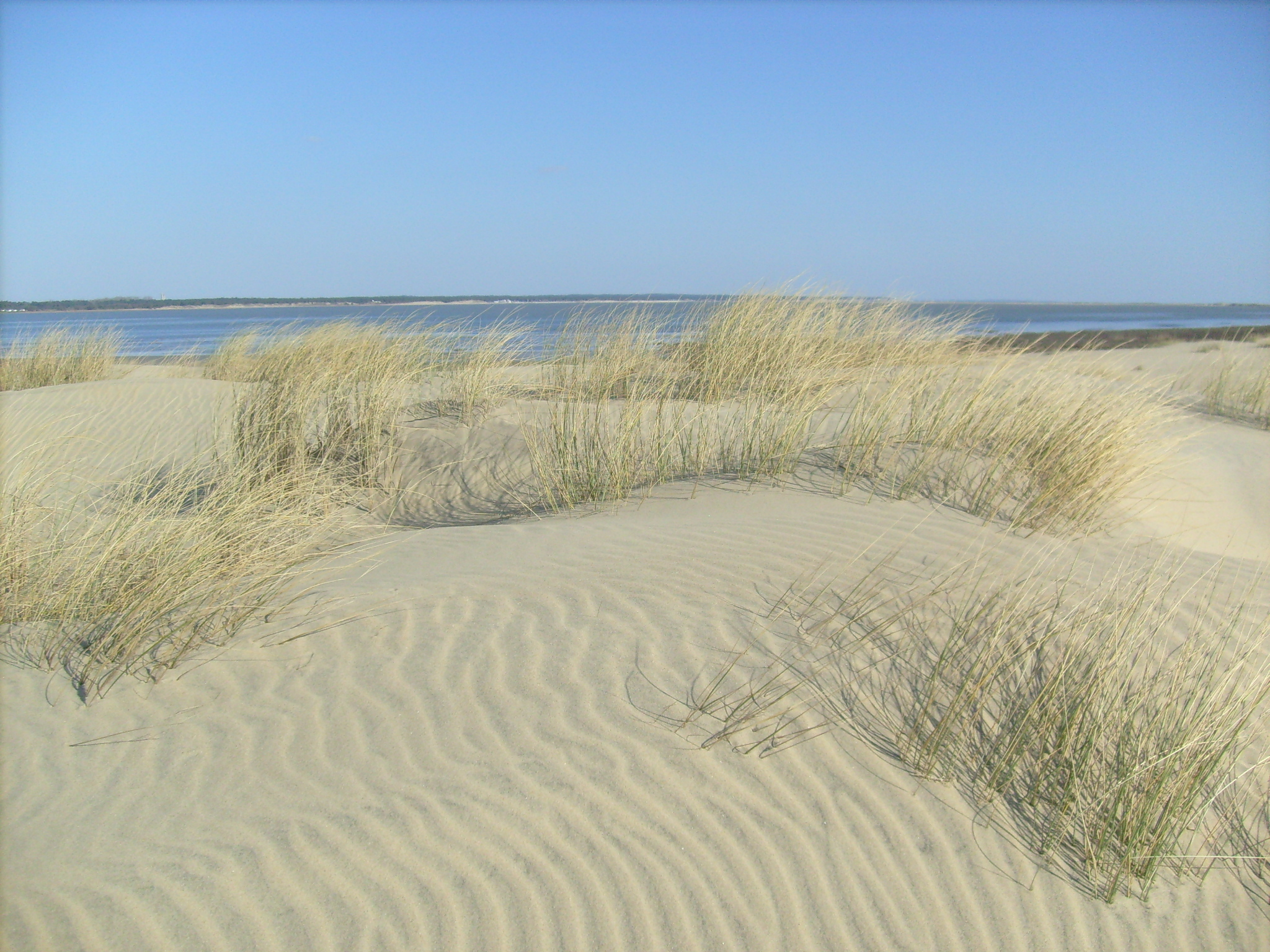
Dunes à la pointe de la Coubre

It was decorated for the celebration of its centenary in 2005, and included a display tracing the history of lighthouses in the estuary of the Gironde. The La Coubre lighthouse was registered as an historic monument on 15 April 2015.

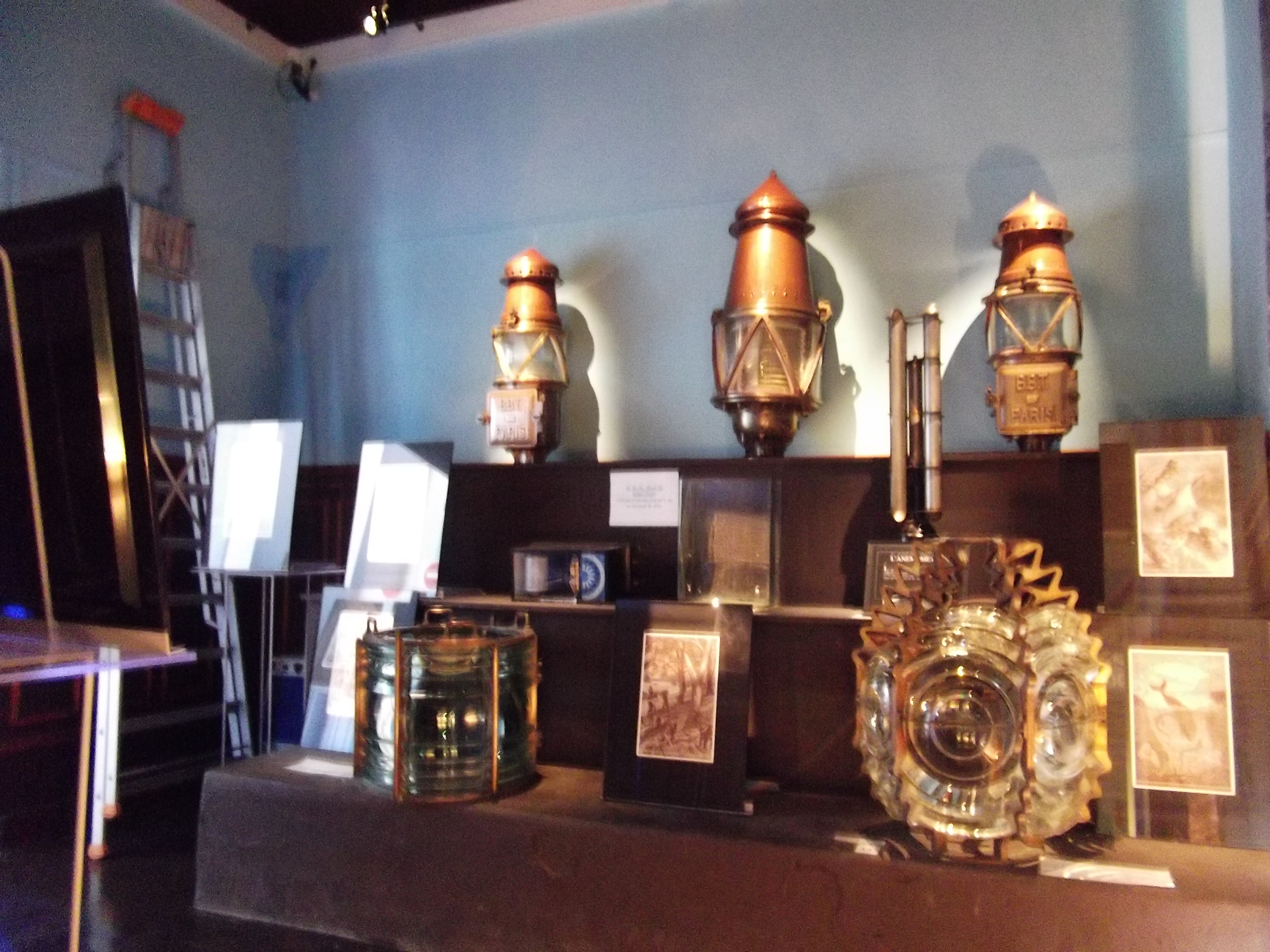
La Coubre lighthouse museum.

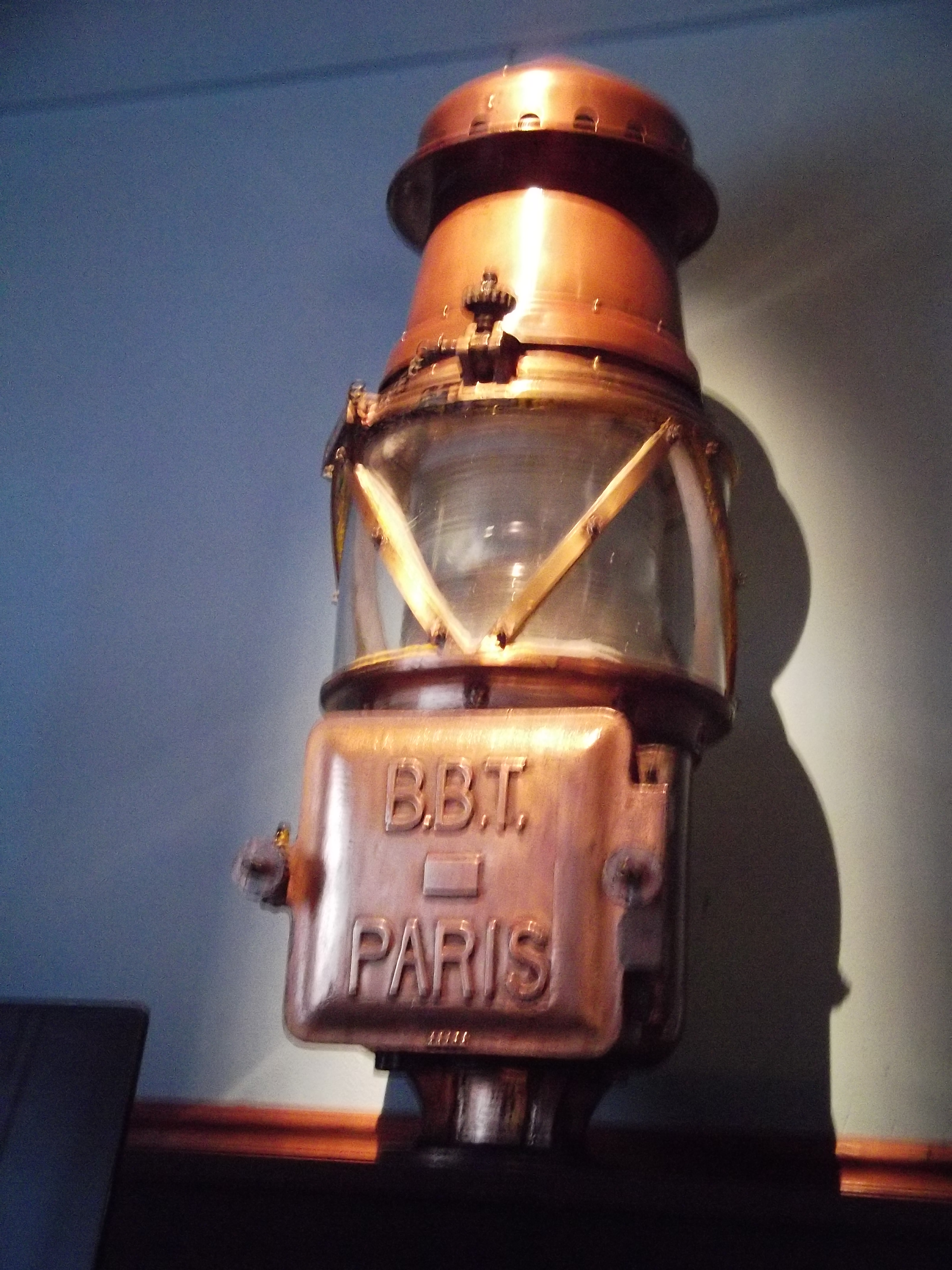

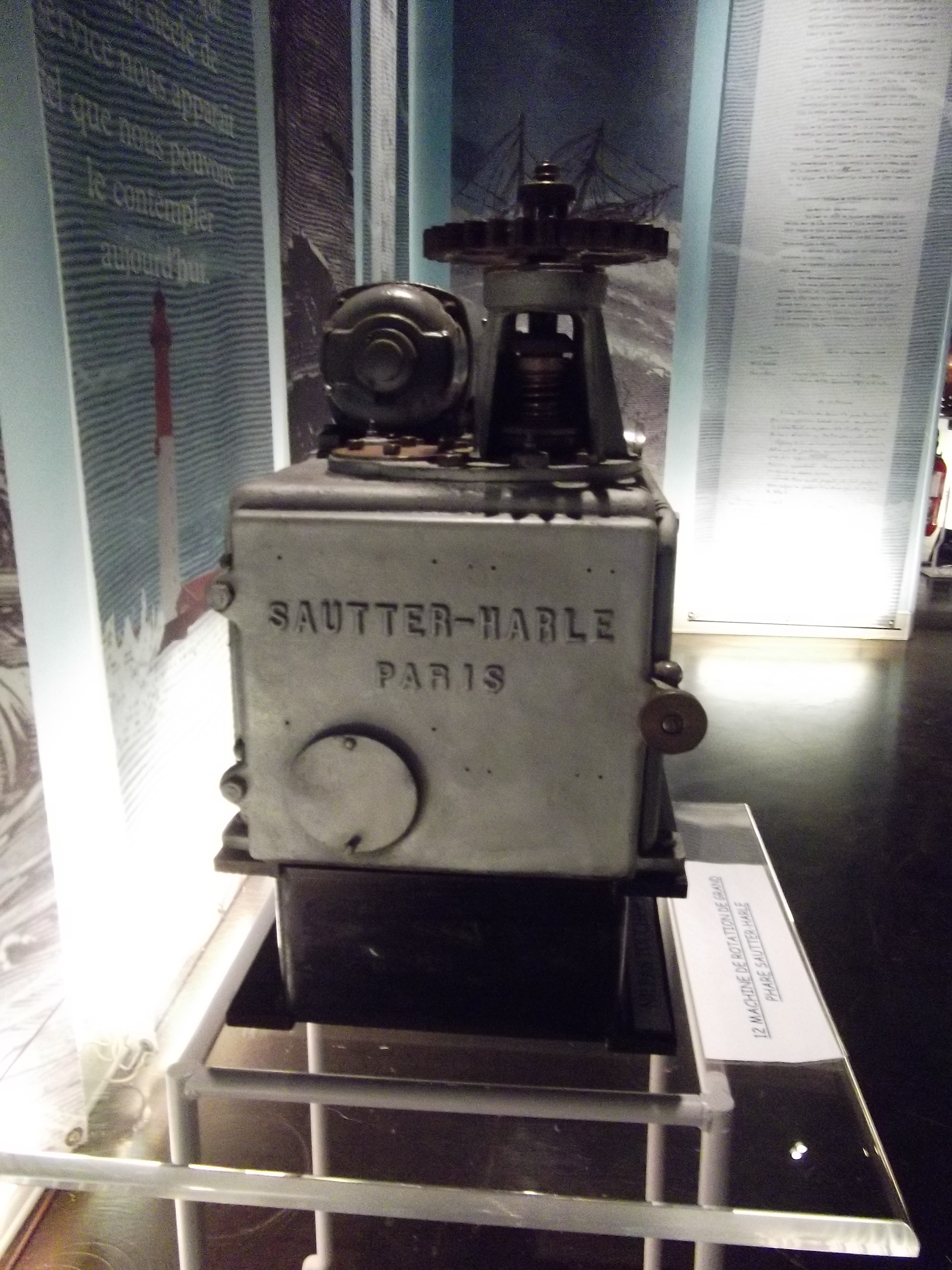

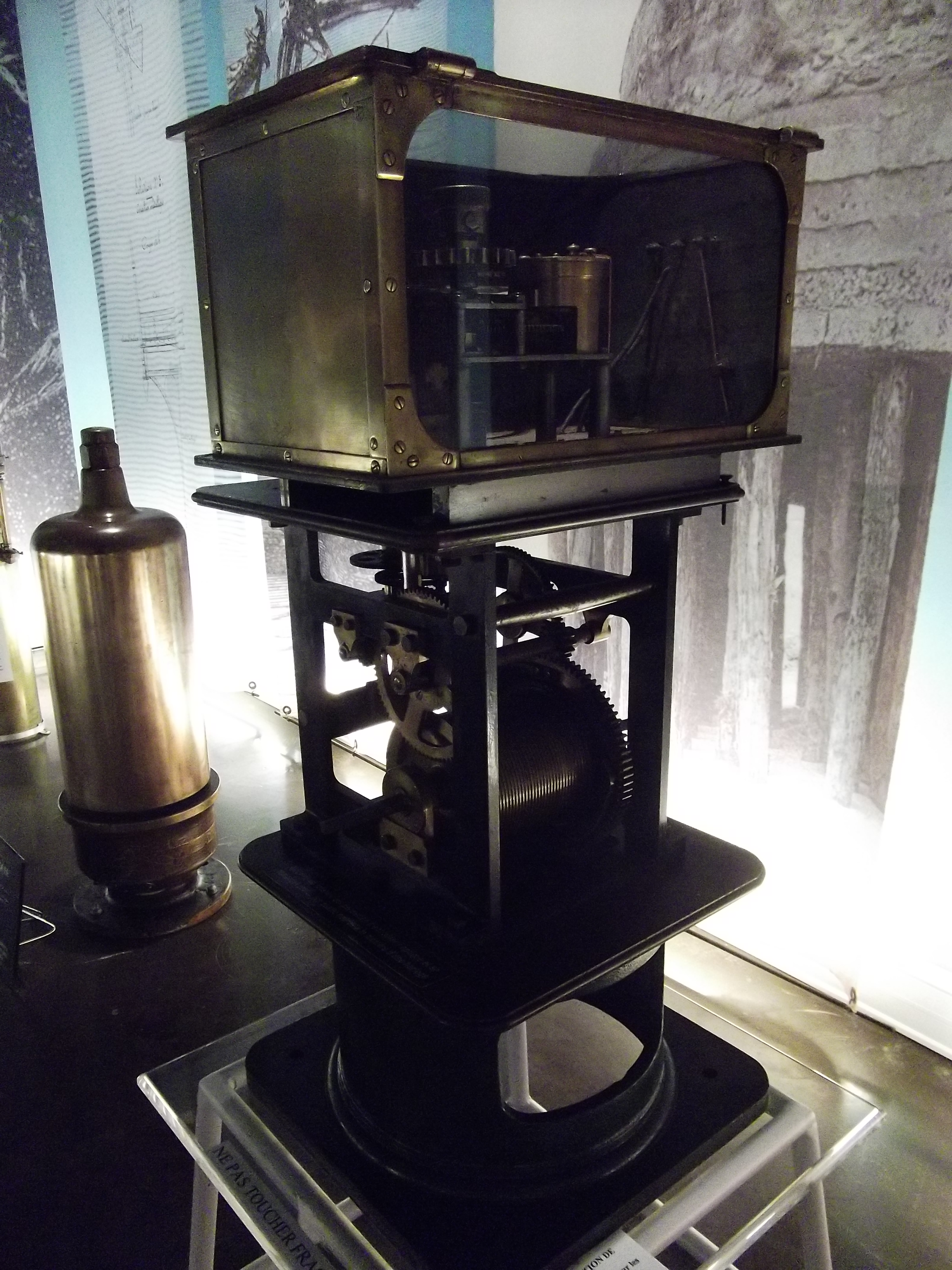

== Economy ==
The geographical location of the municipality is responsible for the balance of two economic sectors, tourism (mostly coastal) and oyster farming.

Its coastline, its some twenty kilometres of beach, a protected forest area and its proximity to the beach resorts of La Côte de beauté (Royan, but also its main satellites: Saint-Palais-sur-Mer, La Palmyre ...) or the Oléron island give tourism a considerable weight, and two tourism offices are present in the common (in the city center and the place Brochard at Ronce-les-Bains) to welcome visitors. The seaside neighborhood of Ronce-les-Bains is equipped with several campsites, guesthouses, hotels, holiday villages, shops and also a casino, one of only two of the agglomeration royannaise with that of Pontaillac. Established in 2007, it is the property of Partouche group, and employed 22 people at that date. It is a significant source of revenue for the city: 15% of casino winnings are donated directly to the commune. Different land use projects are also being studied, including the creation of a deepwater port at "Mus de Loup" in Ronce-les-Bains.

The position of the town in the heart of the oyster basin of Marennes fact that production and refining oysters are an important part of the economy, agriculture and oyster gathering 17.7% of assets (more than average county, established at 15.2%). In fact, La Tremblade is not only the first port of Marennes-Oléron basin, but also the whole of France. This privileged position explains a research center of the IFREMER (French Research Institute for Exploitation of the Sea) is located in the town: it is responsible for conducting research on the marine environment of bringing a track in the development of oysters, to preserve the health of livestock but also to work on genetic improvements.

== Sport ==
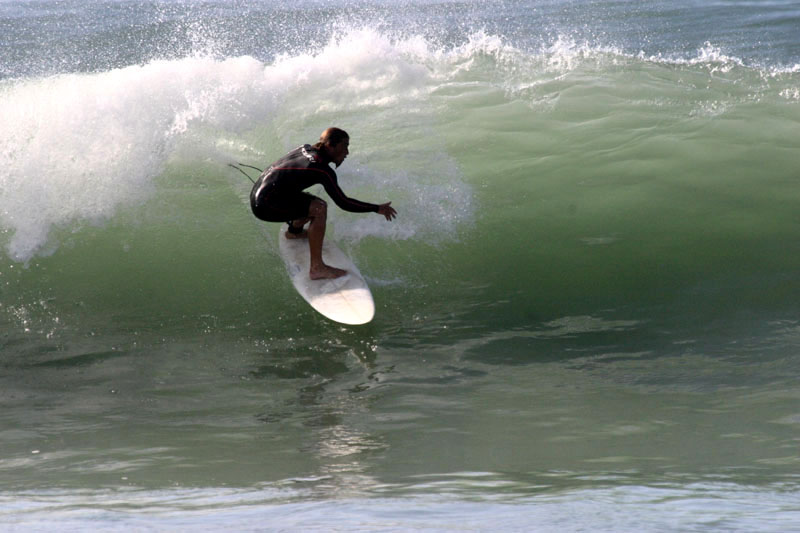
The wild coast of the peninsula of Arvert home to several surf spots like here, the Palmyra surf spot of the Pointe de la Coubre.

La Tremblade organise every year since 2001 the Supercross Tremblade, a test of the SX Tour, European competition motocross "freestyle" of international level. The municipality has also provided a framework for cutting multiglisse France in 2008, organized by the French Federation of Surf. Five disciplines were on the program of this national level competition (surfing, longboard, bodyboard, bodysurfing and stand up paddle). In May 2010, France Championships qualification surf casting took place on the beach of Embellie. The wild coast is home to several famous surfing spots, including here, at La Pointe de la Coubre.

On 25 and 26 April 2015, the spot 46 of the wild coast hosts the first step in surfing France cut (longboard categories and stand up paddle). Smaller surf competitions are organized occasionally, mainly at the spot of La Pointe de la Coubre.

== Population ==
Historical population

Year	Pop.	±% p.a.
1793	2,511	—
1851	2,712	+0.13%
1881	3,090	+0.44%
1911	3,547	+0.46%
1936	3,690	+0.16%
1946	4,028	+0.88%
1954	4,349	+0.96%
1962	4,685	+0.93%
1968	4,925	+0.84%

Year	Pop.	±% p.a.
1975	5,148	+0.63%
1982	4,686	−1.33%
1990	4,623	−0.17%
1999	4,667	+0.11%
2007	4,474	−0.53%
2012	4,743	+1.17%
2017	4,336	−1.78%
2023	4,650	+1.17%

Source: EHESS and INSEE (1968-2023)

== See also ==
- Communes of the Charente-Maritime department
