= Arrondissement of Poitiers =

Coordinates: 46.58°N 0.33°E

Poitiers
- Arrondissement
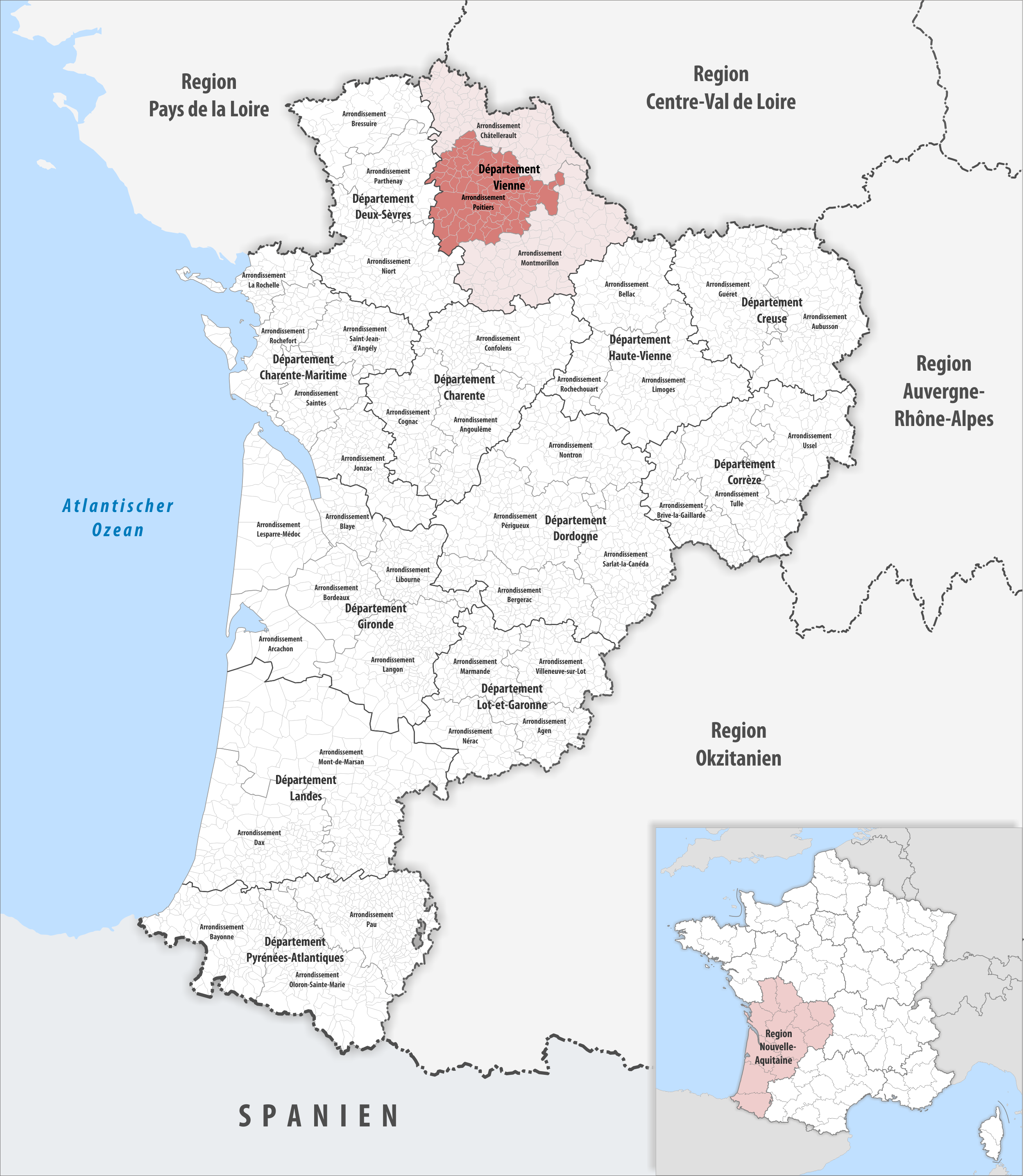
- Location within the region Nouvelle-Aquitaine
- Country: France
- Region: Nouvelle-Aquitaine
- Department: Vienne
- No. of communes: {{{nbcomm}}}
- Area: 2,131.5 km^{2} (823.0 sq mi)
- Population (2023): 266,632
  - Density: 125.09/km^{2} (323.98/sq mi)
- INSEE code: 863

The arrondissement of Poitiers is an arrondissement of France in the Vienne department in the Nouvelle-Aquitaine region. It has 83 communes. Its population is 266,160 (2021), and its area is 2,131.5 km^{2} (823.0 sq mi).

== Composition ==
The communes of the arrondissement of Poitiers, and their INSEE codes, are:

1. Amberre (86002)
2. Aslonnes (86010)
3. Avanton (86016)
4. Ayron (86017)
5. Beaumont Saint-Cyr (86019)
6. Béruges (86024)
7. Biard (86027)
8. Bignoux (86028)
9. Boivre-la-Vallée (86123)
10. Bonnes (86031)
11. Buxerolles (86041)
12. Celle-Lévescault (86045)
13. Chabournay (86048)
14. Chalandray (86050)
15. Champigny en Rochereau (86053)
16. La Chapelle-Moulière (86058)
17. Chasseneuil-du-Poitou (86062)
18. Château-Larcher (86065)
19. Chauvigny (86070)
20. Cherves (86073)
21. Chiré-en-Montreuil (86074)
22. Chouppes (86075)
23. Cissé (86076)
24. Cloué (86080)
25. Coulombiers (86083)
26. Coussay (86085)
27. Croutelle (86088)
28. Cuhon (86089)
29. Curzay-sur-Vonne (86091)
30. Dienné (86094)
31. Dissay (86095)
32. Fleuré (86099)
33. Fontaine-le-Comte (86100)
34. Frozes (86102)
35. Gizay (86105)
36. Iteuil (86113)
37. Jardres (86114)
38. Jaunay-Marigny (86115)
39. Jazeneuil (86116)
40. Latillé (86121)
41. Lavoux (86124)
42. Ligugé (86133)
43. Liniers (86135)
44. Lusignan (86139)
45. Maillé (86142)
46. Maisonneuve (86144)
47. Marçay (86145)
48. Marigny-Chemereau (86147)
49. Marnay (86148)
50. Massognes (86150)
51. Mignaloux-Beauvoir (86157)
52. Migné-Auxances (86158)
53. Mirebeau (86160)
54. Montamisé (86163)
55. Neuville-de-Poitou (86177)
56. Nieuil-l'Espoir (86178)
57. Nouaillé-Maupertuis (86180)
58. Poitiers (86194)
59. Pouillé (86198)
60. La Puye (86202)
61. Quinçay (86204)
62. Roches-Prémarie-Andillé (86209)
63. Rouillé (86213)
64. Saint-Benoît (86214)
65. Sainte-Radégonde (86239)
66. Saint-Georges-lès-Baillargeaux (86222)
67. Saint-Julien-l'Ars (86226)
68. Saint-Martin-la-Pallu (86281)
69. Saint-Sauvant (86244)
70. Sanxay (86253)
71. Savigny-Lévescault (86256)
72. Sèvres-Anxaumont (86261)
73. Smarves (86263)
74. Tercé (86268)
75. Thurageau (86271)
76. Vernon (86284)
77. La Villedieu-du-Clain (86290)
78. Villiers (86292)
79. Vivonne (86293)
80. Vouillé (86294)
81. Vouneuil-sous-Biard (86297)
82. Vouzailles (86299)
83. Yversay (86300)

== History ==
The arrondissement of Poitiers was created in 1800. At the January 2017 reorganisation of the arrondissements of Vienne, it received four communes from the arrondissement of Châtellerault and two communes from the arrondissement of Montmorillon.

As a result of the reorganisation of the cantons of France which came into effect in 2015, the borders of the cantons are no longer related to the borders of the arrondissements. The cantons of the arrondissement of Poitiers were, as of January 2015:

1. Lusignan
2. Mirebeau
3. Neuville-de-Poitou
4. Poitiers-1
5. Poitiers-2
6. Poitiers-3
7. Poitiers-4
8. Poitiers-5
9. Poitiers-6
10. Poitiers-7
11. Saint-Georges-lès-Baillargeaux
12. Saint-Julien-l'Ars
13. La Villedieu-du-Clain
14. Vivonne
15. Vouillé
