= Departmental Council of Vienne =

Departmental legislature in France

The Departmental Council of Vienne (French: Conseil départemental de la Vienne) is the deliberative assembly of the French department of Vienne in the region of Nouvelle-Aquitaine. Its headquarters are in Poitiers.

The president of the Vienne departmental council is Alain Pichon (DVD). He was re-elected on 1 July 2021.

== Vice Presidents ==
List of vice-presidents of the departmental council of Vienne
Order	Name	Party	Canton (constituency)	Delegacy
1st	Valérie Dauge	UCD	Châtellerault-2	Elderly and disabled
2nd	Henri Colin	UDI	Châtellerault-1	Education, colleges, university and buildings
3rd	Pascale Moreau	DVD	Chatellerault-3	Territorial development
4th	Claude Eidelstein	DVD	Chasseneuil-du-Poitou	Finances and general budget
5th	Rose-Marie Bertaud	LR	Vivonne	Social action, childhood and family
6th	Gilbert Beaujaneau	LR	Vivonne	Roads and mobility
7th	Pascale Guittet	DVD	Chasseneuil-du-Poitou	Youth, sport and citizenship
8th	Benoît Coquelet	UCD	Vouneuil-sous-Biard	Integration, employment and economic policies
9th	Séverine Saint-Pé	UD	Migné-Auxances	Digital planning and inclusion
10th	Jean-Louis Ledeux	DVD	Lusignan	Agriculture and rurality
11th	Marie-Renée Desroses	UD	Lussac-les-Châteaux	Human resources and general resources
