= Jacques Grandon =

French politician (1927–2026)

Member of the French Senate for Vienne
- In office 2 November 1986 – 1 July 1988
- Preceded by: René Monory
- Succeeded by: René Monory

Member of the General Council of Vienne
- In office 2 May 1965 – 20 March 2008
- Preceded by: Paul Guillon
- Succeeded by: Michel Touchard
- Constituency: Canton of Poitiers-Nord (1965–1973); Canton of Poitiers-3 (1973–2008)

Personal details
- Born: 9 May 1927 Saint-Benoît, France
- Died: 14 August 2026 (aged 99) Poitiers, France
- Party: CD; CDS
- Education: Collège Stanislas de Paris; University of Poitiers
- Occupation: Lawyer

Jacques Grandon (French: [ʒˈak ɡʁɑ̃dˈɔ̃]; 9 May 1927 – 14 August 2026) was a French politician of the Democratic Centre (CD) and the Centre of Social Democrats (CDS).

The son of Yvonne Duranceau and butcher Alfred Grandon, he attended the Collège Stanislas de Paris and the University of Poitiers before joining the bar in 1948. From 1965 to 2008, he was a member of the General Council of Vienne and served in the Senate from 1986 to 1988. In 2018, the Poitiers Bar Association honored him for 70 years of service. He was one of the oldest lawyers in France, still taking cases at the age of 91.

Grandon died in Poitiers on 14 August 2026, at the age of 99.
