= Fleuré =

Fleuré may refer to the following places in France:

- Fleuré, Orne, a commune in the Orne department
- Fleuré, Vienne, a commune in the Vienne department

== See also ==
- H. J. Fleure (1877–1969), British zoologist and geographer
