= Saint-Sauvant =

Saint-Sauvant may refer to the following places in France:

- Saint-Sauvant, Charente-Maritime, a commune in the Charente-Maritime department
- Saint-Sauvant, Vienne, a commune in the Vienne department
