= Mignaloux-Beauvoir =

- Commune
- Location of Mignaloux-Beauvoir
- Location within France Location within Nouvelle-Aquitaine
- Coordinates: 46°32′39″N 0°25′02″E
- Country: France
- Region: Nouvelle-Aquitaine
- Department: Vienne
- Arrondissement: Poitiers
- Canton: Poitiers-4
- Intercommunality: CU Grand Poitiers

Government
  - Mayor (2020–2026): Patrick Ferrer
- Area^{1}: 21.56 km^{2} (8.32 sq mi)
- Elevation: 129 m (423 ft)
- Highest elevation: 141 m (463 ft)
- Lowest elevation: 99 m (325 ft)
- Population (2023): 5,229
  - Density: 242.5/km^{2} (628.2/sq mi)
- Time zone: UTC+01:00 (CET)
  - Summer (DST): UTC+02:00 (CEST)
- INSEE/Postal code: 86157 /86550
- ^{1} French Land Register data, which excludes lakes, ponds, glaciers > 1 km^{2} (0.386 sq mi or 247 acres) and river estuaries.

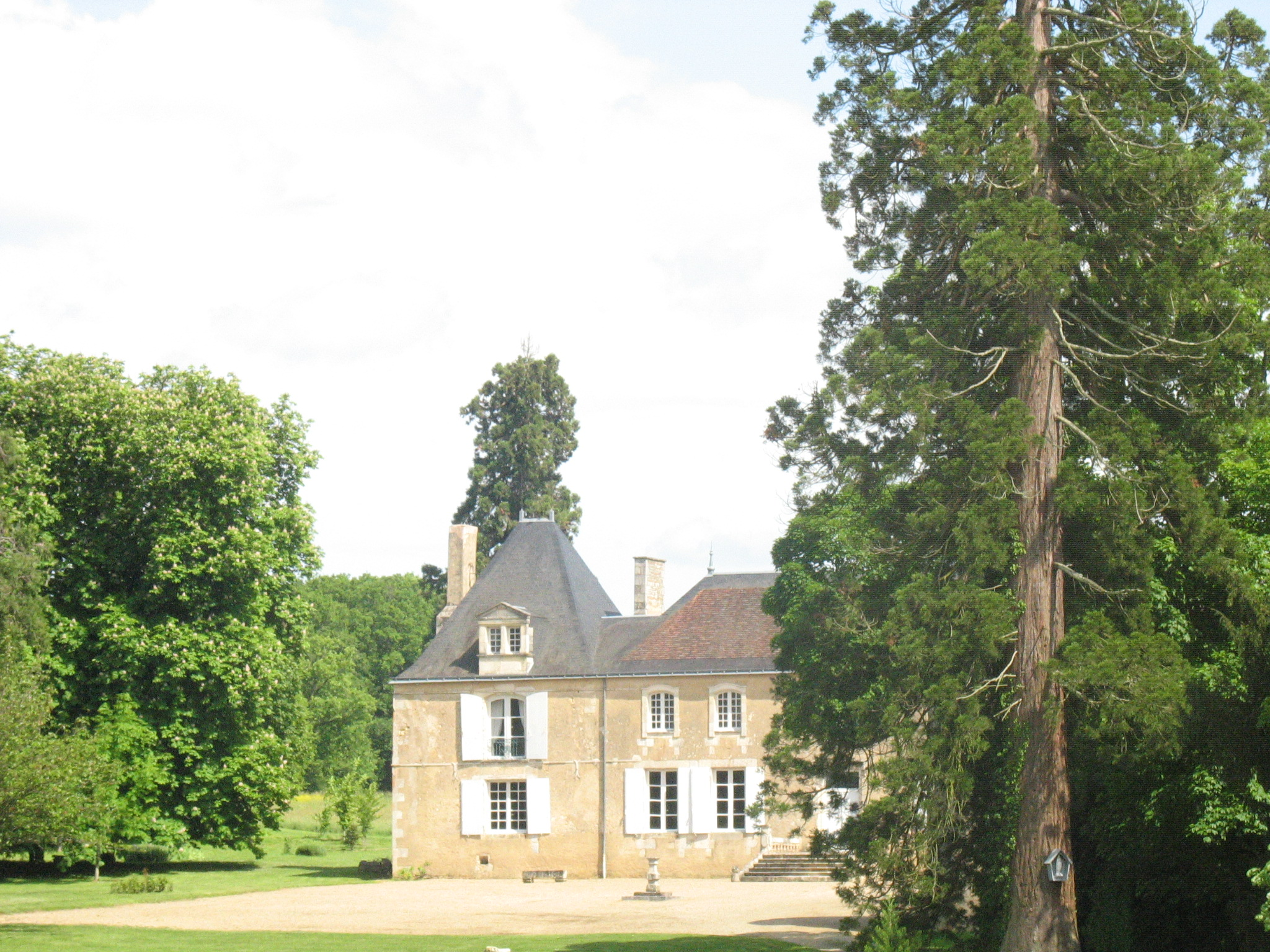
Logis de La Cigogne mansion

Mignaloux-Beauvoir (French pronunciation: [miɲalu bovwaʁ]) is a commune from the Center-West of France, located in the south-eastern suburbs of Poitiers, in the Vienne department in Nouvelle-Aquitaine region.

== Geography ==
=== Climate ===
The climate that characterizes the commune is considered to be « altered oceanic climate», according to the topology of the climates of France which then has eight major types of climates in mainland France. In 2010, the town comes out of the same type of climate in the classification established by Météo-France, which now only counts, at first glance, five main types of climates in mainland. It is a transition zone between the oceanic climate, the mountain climate and the semi-continental climate. The temperature differences between winter and summer increase with the distance from the sea. Precipitation is lower than at the seaside, except near the landforms.

The climate parameters that made it possible to establish the 2010 topology include six variables for temperature and eight for precipitation, whose values correspond to the 1971-2000 normal. The seven main variables characterizing the commune are presented in the box below.

Communal climate parameters over the period 1971-2000
- Annual temperature mean: 11,6 °C
- Number of days with temperature under -5 °C: 2,4 d
- Number of days with temperature above 30 °C: 6,4 d
- Annual thermal amplitude: 14,7 °C
- Annual precipitation totals: 759mm
- Number of days of precipitation in January: 11,2 d
- Number of days of precipitation in July: 6,7 d

With climate changes, these variables have evolved. A study carried out in 2014 by the Directorate General for Energy and Climate supplemented by regional studies predicts that the average temperature should increase and the average precipitation should decrease, with however strong regional variations. These changes can be observed at the Météo-France meteorological station, « Buxerolles », in the municipality of Buxerolles, commissioned in 1948 and which is 8 km away as the crow flies, where the mean annual temperature is 12,3 °C and the rainfall is 733,4 mm for the period 1981-2010.

=== Communication routes and transport ===
The railway line from Saint-Benoît to Le Blanc passes through the municipal territory. The town has a train station, served by trains between Poitiers and Limoges.

The town is crossed by two National Roads:

- The RN147, which connects Poitiers to Limoges,
- The RN151, which connects Poitiers to Chauvigny.

== Urbanism ==
=== Typology ===
Mignaloux-Beauvoir is a rural municipality, with a majority of agricultural land use (67,6% of the territory in 2018, down from 70,6% in 1990) and a minority of urban areas (13%), according to the Corine Land Cover classification . In 2020, the municipality was classified as a "low density municipality" according to the Insee density grid .

It is part of the functional area of Poitiers, which includes 97 municipalities.

== History ==
The site of Mignaloux-Beauvoir has been occupied since protohistoric times. During the Antiquity, the site was crossed by two Roman ways.

The name "Mignaloux" appeared first in 848 under the Latin form villa exania magnolarum in a chart of the Nouaillé abbey, and the name "Beauvoir" is attested later, in 1187, referring to a commandery .

During the Middle Ages, multiple hamlets existed in the area. The two parishes of Beauvoir and Mignaloux depended on Poitiers. Several localities still bear the name of ecclesiastical properties.

During the Hundred Years' War, on 16 September 1356, during the Black Prince's chevauchée, the latter, leaving Châtellerault, rushed with 200 men-at-arms through the forest of Moulière and came out on the road from Poitiers to Chauvigny. There, he fell by surprise on the rearguard of the French army, 700 men-at-arms and knights strong, at the site of Chaboterie au Breuil l'Abbesse, located in the municipality. The French fled into the forest, losing 240 men including the counts of Joigny and Auxerre and the sieur de Châtillon. This marked the prelude to a catastrophic defeat for the kingdom of France.

In 1798 the two parishes were united into one single municipality. The administrative center was attributed to Beauvoir, then Mignaloux. In 1819, the Poitiers - Limoges road was built across the municipality, literally cutting it in two. In 1892 the town hall and the school were built.

During World War II, the Luftwaffe bombed the railway station on 19 June 1940, without causing any casualties. During the summer of 1944, the Allied air forces carried out numerous strafing operations: fighters patrolled the axes (railways, main roads) in search of targets of opportunity (German convoy, military train, camp, etc.). This is how Allied fighters machine-gunned the station on 16 June.

The population growth accelerated from 1968. The municipal boundaries changed in 1974 following the construction of the new university campus and the hospital center of Poitiers. From this date, the municipality, which was essentially rural until then, started to urbanize.

== Population ==
Historical population
Year	Pop.	±% p.a.
1968	852	—
1975	1,207	+5.10%
1982	1,638	+4.46%
1990	2,357	+4.65%
1999	3,341	+3.95%
2007	3,881	+1.89%
2012	4,011	+0.66%
2017	4,577	+2.68%
2023	5,229	+2.24%
Source: INSEE

== Points of interest ==
- Jardin botanique universitaire de Poitiers

== See also ==
- Communes of the Vienne department
