= Cuhon =

- Commune
- Location of Cuhon
- Location within France Location within Nouvelle-Aquitaine
- Coordinates: 46°45′34″N 0°05′50″E
- Country: France
- Region: Nouvelle-Aquitaine
- Department: Vienne
- Arrondissement: Poitiers
- Canton: Migné-Auxances

Government
  - Mayor (2020–2026): Philippe Garanger
- Area^{1}: 16.34 km^{2} (6.31 sq mi)
- Elevation: 108 m (354 ft)
- Highest elevation: 126 m (413 ft)
- Lowest elevation: 93 m (305 ft)
- Population (2023): 377
  - Density: 23.1/km^{2} (59.8/sq mi)
- Time zone: UTC+01:00 (CET)
  - Summer (DST): UTC+02:00 (CEST)
- INSEE/Postal code: 86089 /86110
- ^{1} French Land Register data, which excludes lakes, ponds, glaciers > 1 km^{2} (0.386 sq mi or 247 acres) and river estuaries.

Cuhon (French pronunciation: [ky.ɔ̃]) is a commune in the Vienne department in the Nouvelle-Aquitaine region in western France.

== See also ==
- Communes of the Vienne department
