= Voulon =

- Commune
- Location of Voulon
- Location within France Location within Nouvelle-Aquitaine
- Coordinates: 46°21′26″N 0°14′49″E
- Country: France
- Region: Nouvelle-Aquitaine
- Department: Vienne
- Arrondissement: Montmorillon
- Canton: Lusignan
- Intercommunality: Civraisien en Poitou

Government
  - Mayor (2020–2026): Roland Latu
- Area^{1}: 8.31 km^{2} (3.21 sq mi)
- Highest elevation: 145 m (476 ft)
- Lowest elevation: 92 m (302 ft)
- Population (2023): 463
  - Density: 55.7/km^{2} (144/sq mi)
- Time zone: UTC+01:00 (CET)
  - Summer (DST): UTC+02:00 (CEST)
- INSEE/Postal code: 86296 /86700
- ^{1} French Land Register data, which excludes lakes, ponds, glaciers > 1 km^{2} (0.386 sq mi or 247 acres) and river estuaries.

Voulon (French pronunciation: [vulɔ̃]) is a commune in the Vienne department in the Nouvelle-Aquitaine region in western France.

== See also ==
- Communes of the Vienne department
