= Buxerolles, Vienne =

Buxerolles
- Commune
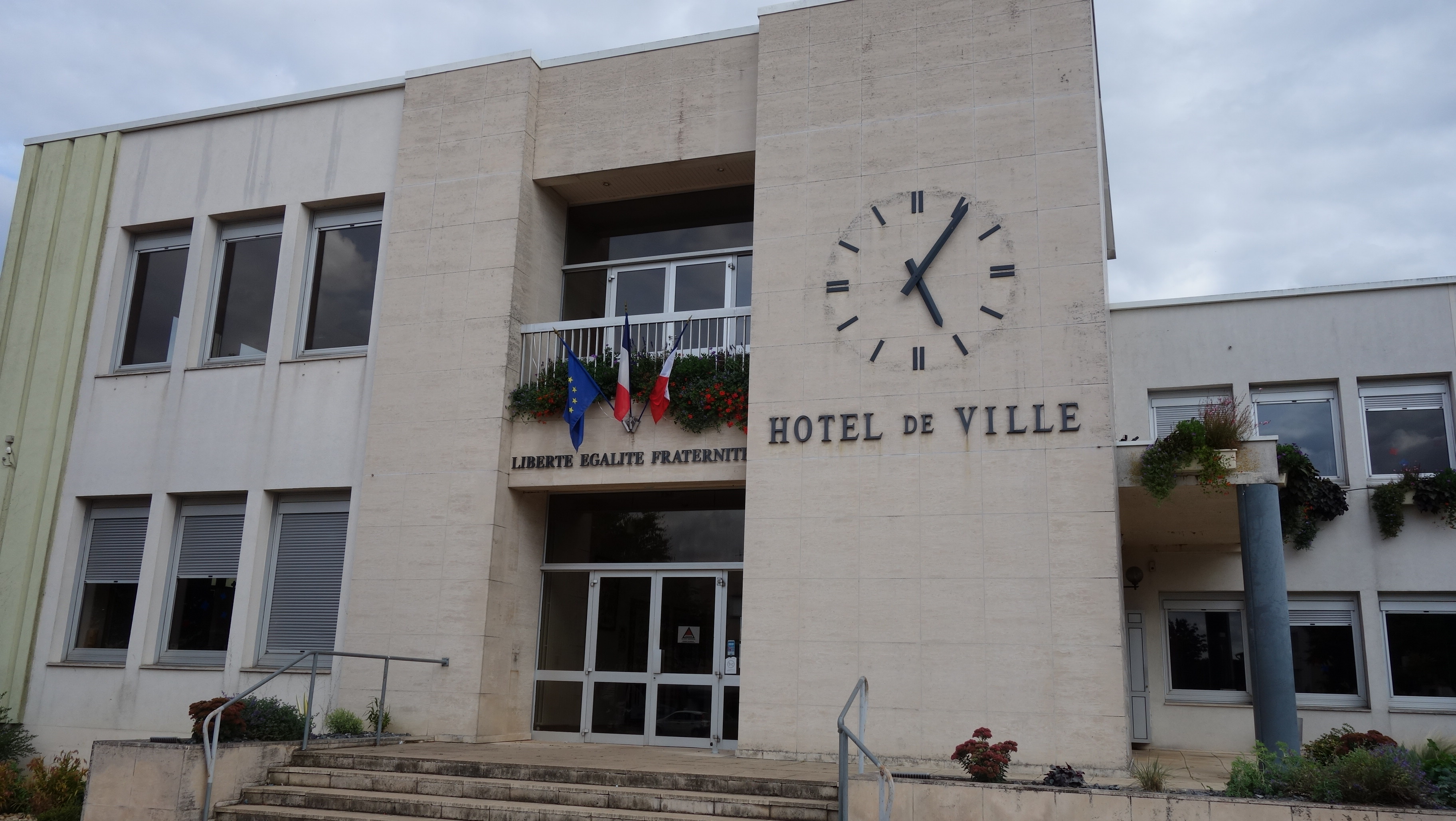
- Town hall

- Coat of arms
- Location of Buxerolles
- Location within France Location within Nouvelle-Aquitaine
- Coordinates: 46°35′54″N 0°21′00″E
- Country: France
- Region: Nouvelle-Aquitaine
- Department: Vienne
- Arrondissement: Poitiers
- Canton: Poitiers-2
- Intercommunality: CU Grand Poitiers

Government
  - Mayor (2020–2026): Gérald Blanchard
- Area^{1}: 9.10 km^{2} (3.51 sq mi)
- Highest elevation: 124 m (407 ft)
- Lowest elevation: 65 m (213 ft)
- Population (2023): 10,289
  - Density: 1,130/km^{2} (2,930/sq mi)
- Time zone: UTC+01:00 (CET)
  - Summer (DST): UTC+02:00 (CEST)
- INSEE/Postal code: 86041 /86180
- ^{1} French Land Register data, which excludes lakes, ponds, glaciers > 1 km^{2} (0.386 sq mi or 247 acres) and river estuaries.

Buxerolles (French pronunciation: [byksəʁɔl]) is a commune in the Vienne department, Nouvelle-Aquitaine, western France. It is a northern suburb of Poitiers.

== Population ==
Historical population
Year	Pop.	±% p.a.
1968	4,064	—
1975	5,156	+3.46%
1982	5,466	+0.84%
1990	6,337	+1.87%
1999	8,787	+3.70%
2007	9,679	+1.22%
2012	9,992	+0.64%
2017	10,023	+0.06%
2023	10,289	+0.44%
Source: INSEE

== See also ==
- Communes of the Vienne department
