= Migné-Auxances =

- Commune
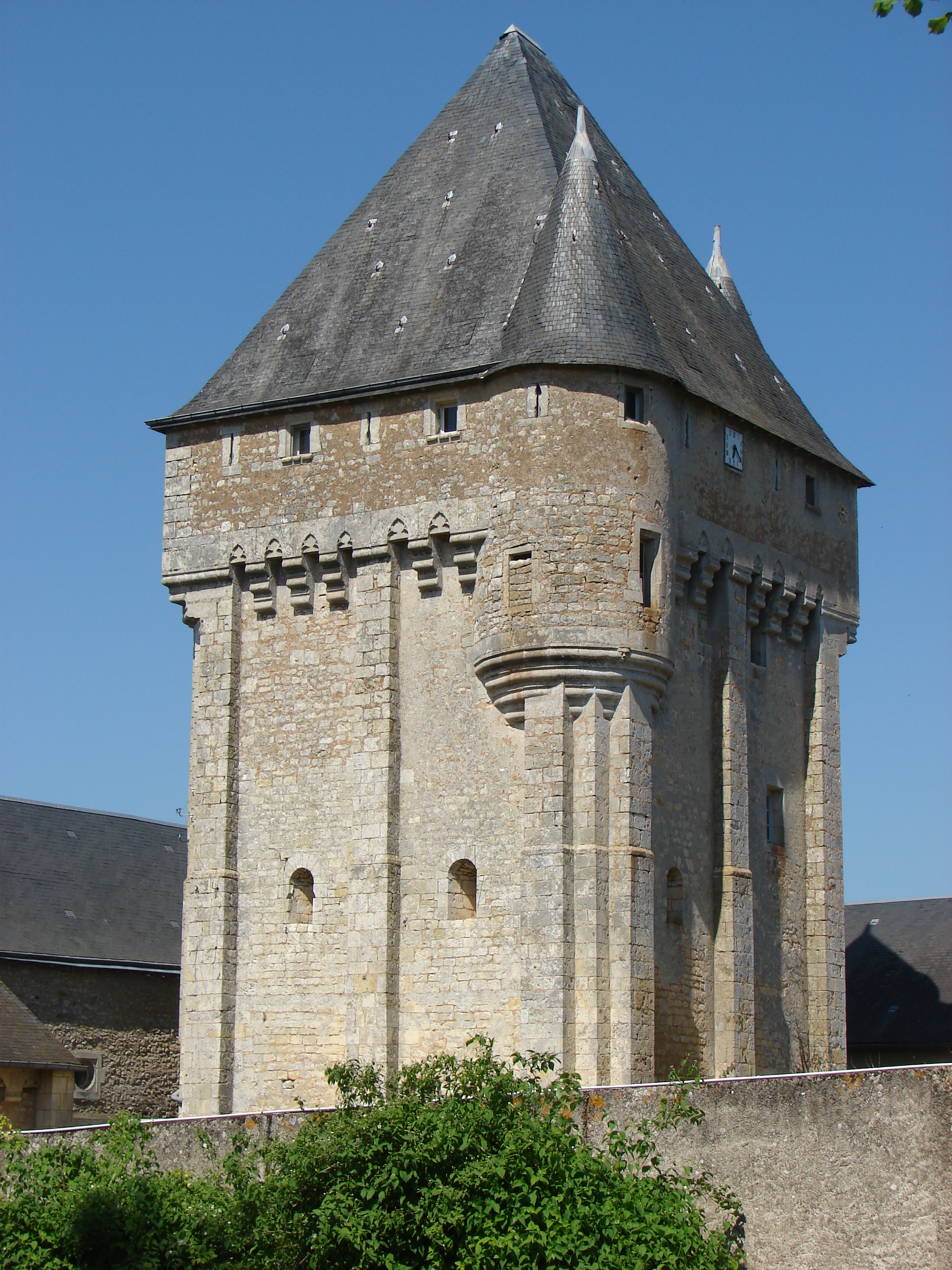
- The keep of the eleventh century castle, in Migné-Auxances

- Coat of arms
- Location of Migné-Auxances
- Location within France Location within Nouvelle-Aquitaine
- Coordinates: 46°37′39″N 0°18′52″E
- Country: France
- Region: Nouvelle-Aquitaine
- Department: Vienne
- Arrondissement: Poitiers
- Canton: Migné-Auxances
- Intercommunality: CU Grand Poitiers

Government
  - Mayor (2020–2026): Florence Jardin
- Area^{1}: 28.96 km^{2} (11.18 sq mi)
- Elevation: 100 m (330 ft)
- Highest elevation: 143 m (469 ft)
- Lowest elevation: 65 m (213 ft)
- Population (2023): 6,285
  - Density: 217.0/km^{2} (562.1/sq mi)
- Time zone: UTC+01:00 (CET)
  - Summer (DST): UTC+02:00 (CEST)
- INSEE/Postal code: 86158 /86440
- ^{1} French Land Register data, which excludes lakes, ponds, glaciers > 1 km^{2} (0.386 sq mi or 247 acres) and river estuaries.

Migné-Auxances (French pronunciation: [miɲe ozãs]) is a commune in the Vienne department in the Nouvelle-Aquitaine region in western France.

== History ==
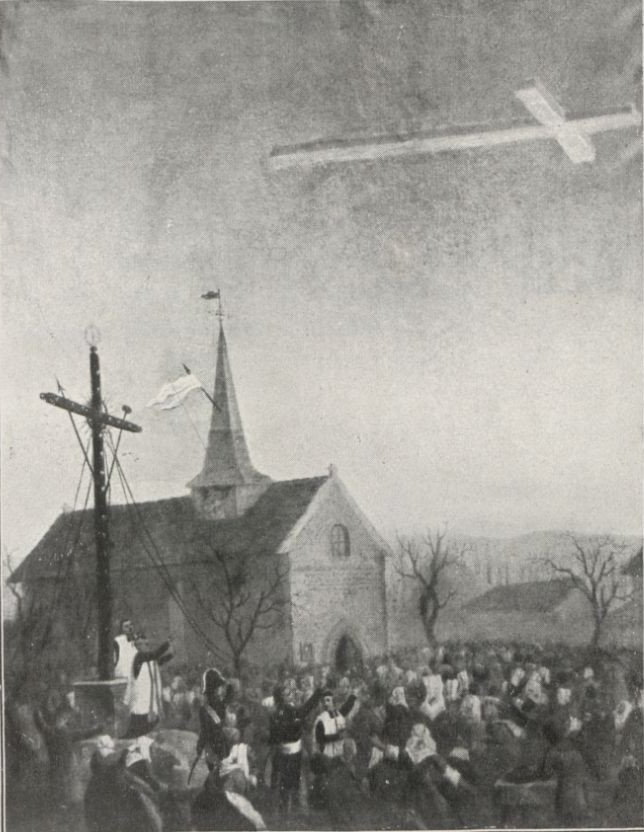
Apparition of a cross on December 17, 1826

On 17 December 1826, the village of Migné witnesses the appearance of a luminous cross in the sky, in front of more than 2000 people gathered on the occasion of the planting of a cross in the village cemetery. Standing about fifty meters above the ground, lying in the direction of the West, about forty yards in length, it was visible from 17:00 to 17:30. Its presence was predicted seven years before its appearance by the abbot Suffrant (1755-1828), parish priest of Maumusson (Loire-Inferieure) and an ecclesiastic M. Vrindts.

== Population ==
Historical population
| Year | Pop. | ±% p.a. |
|---|---|---|
| 1968 | 3,052 | — |
| 1975 | 3,691 | +2.75% |
| 1982 | 4,230 | +1.97% |
| 1990 | 5,000 | +2.11% |
| 1999 | 5,805 | +1.67% |
| 2007 | 5,969 | +0.35% |
| 2012 | 5,957 | −0.04% |
| 2017 | 6,071 | +0.38% |
| 2023 | 6,285 | +0.58% |
Source: INSEE

== See also ==
- Communes of the Vienne department
