= Aslonnes =

- Commune
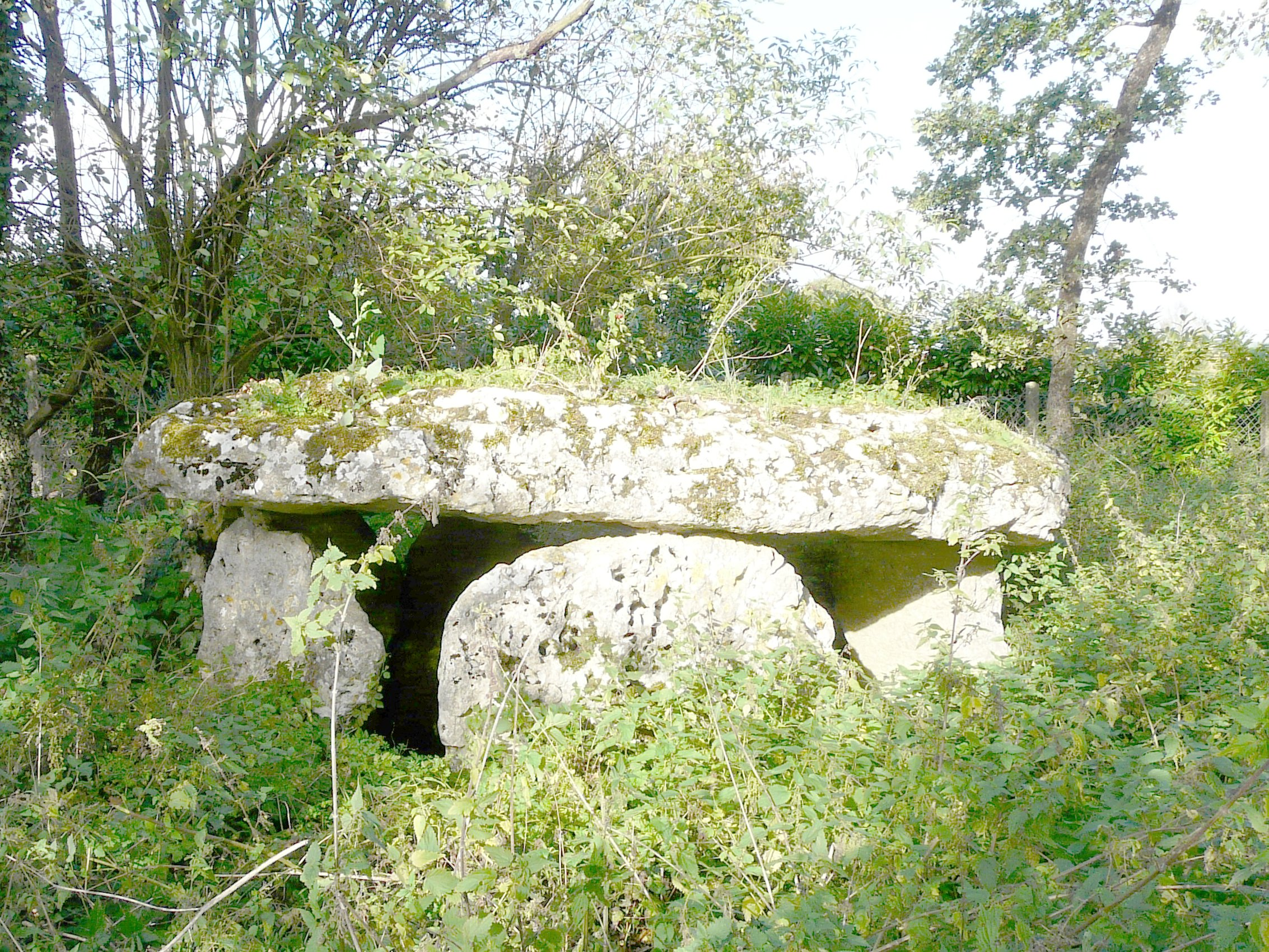
- The Dolmen of Laverré, in Aslonnes
- Location of Aslonnes
- Location within France Location within Nouvelle-Aquitaine
- Coordinates: 46°26′39″N 0°20′07″E
- Country: France
- Region: Nouvelle-Aquitaine
- Department: Vienne
- Arrondissement: Poitiers
- Canton: Vivonne
- Intercommunality: CC Vallées du Clain

Government
  - Mayor (2020–2026): Roland Bouchet
- Area^{1}: 23.00 km^{2} (8.88 sq mi)
- Elevation: 130 m (430 ft)
- Highest elevation: 139 m (456 ft)
- Lowest elevation: 81 m (266 ft)
- Population (2023): 1,136
  - Density: 49.39/km^{2} (127.9/sq mi)
- Time zone: UTC+01:00 (CET)
  - Summer (DST): UTC+02:00 (CEST)
- INSEE/Postal code: 86010 /86340
- ^{1} French Land Register data, which excludes lakes, ponds, glaciers > 1 km^{2} (0.386 sq mi or 247 acres) and river estuaries.

Aslonnes (French pronunciation: [alɔn]) is a commune in the Vienne department in the Nouvelle-Aquitaine region in western France.

== Geography ==
The Clouère forms part of the commune's south-western border, then flows into the Clain, which forms its western border.

== See also ==
- Communes of the Vienne department
