= Marigny-Chemereau =

- Commune
- Location of Marigny-Chemereau
- Location within France Location within Nouvelle-Aquitaine
- Coordinates: 46°25′35″N 0°13′02″E
- Country: France
- Region: Nouvelle-Aquitaine
- Department: Vienne
- Arrondissement: Poitiers
- Canton: Vivonne

Government
  - Mayor (2020–2026): Rita Noreskal
- Area^{1}: 11.51 km^{2} (4.44 sq mi)
- Highest elevation: 142 m (466 ft)
- Lowest elevation: 87 m (285 ft)
- Population (2023): 603
  - Density: 52.4/km^{2} (136/sq mi)
- Time zone: UTC+01:00 (CET)
  - Summer (DST): UTC+02:00 (CEST)
- INSEE/Postal code: 86147 /86370
- ^{1} French Land Register data, which excludes lakes, ponds, glaciers > 1 km^{2} (0.386 sq mi or 247 acres) and river estuaries.

Marigny-Chemereau (French pronunciation: [maʁiɲi ʃəmʁo]) is a commune in the Vienne department in the Nouvelle-Aquitaine region in western France.

== See also ==
- Communes of the Vienne department
