= Vivonne =

- Commune
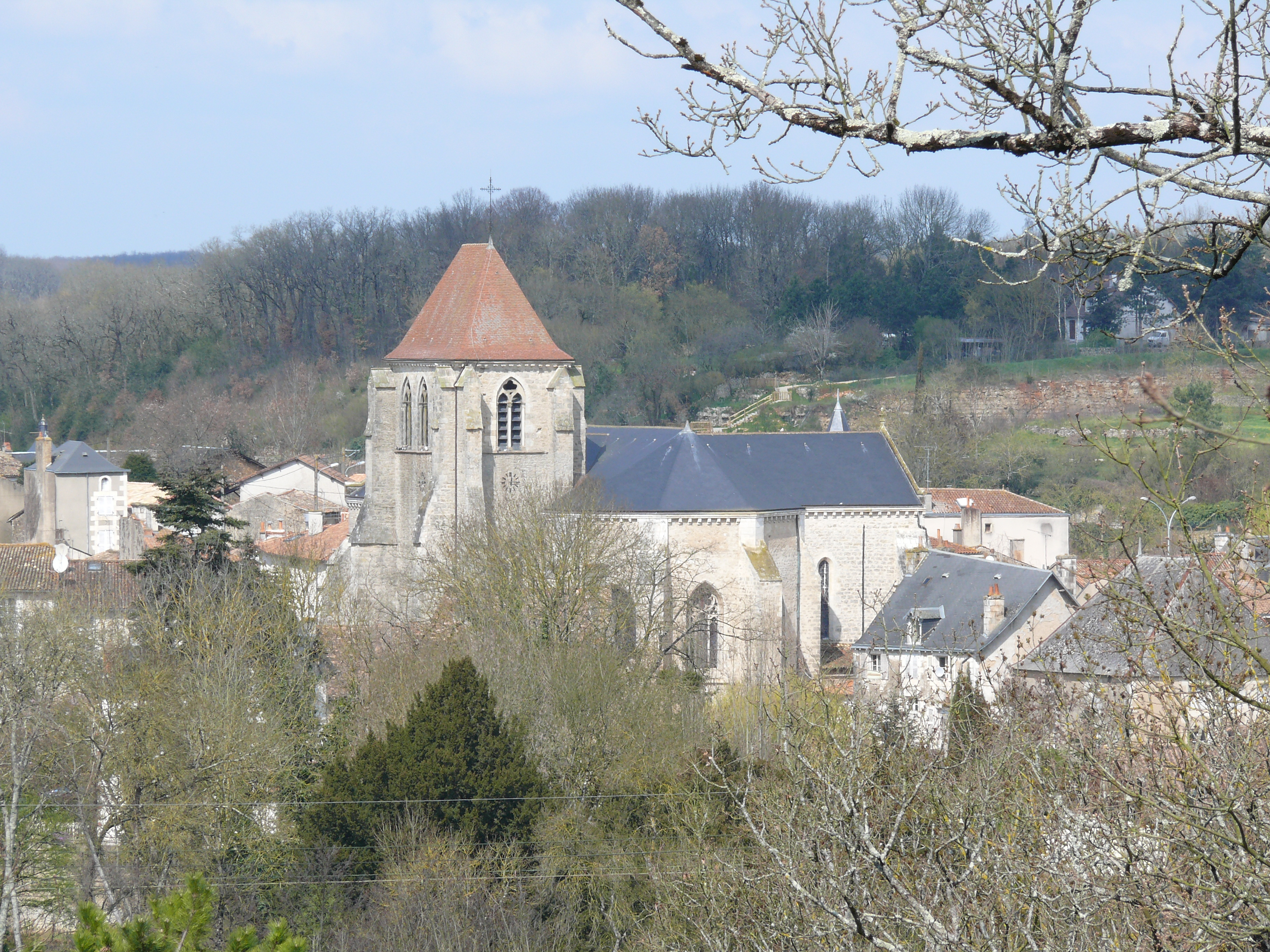
- The church in Vivonne

- Coat of arms
- Location of Vivonne
- Location within France Location within Nouvelle-Aquitaine
- Coordinates: 46°25′52″N 0°15′55″E
- Country: France
- Region: Nouvelle-Aquitaine
- Department: Vienne
- Arrondissement: Poitiers
- Canton: Vivonne
- Intercommunality: Vallées du Clain

Government
  - Mayor (2020–2026): Rose-Marie Bertaud
- Area^{1}: 41.16 km^{2} (15.89 sq mi)
- Highest elevation: 149 m (489 ft)
- Lowest elevation: 81 m (266 ft)
- Population (2023): 4,550
  - Density: 111/km^{2} (286/sq mi)
- Time zone: UTC+01:00 (CET)
  - Summer (DST): UTC+02:00 (CEST)
- INSEE/Postal code: 86293 /86370
- ^{1} French Land Register data, which excludes lakes, ponds, glaciers > 1 km^{2} (0.386 sq mi or 247 acres) and river estuaries.

Vivonne (French pronunciation: [vivɔn]) is a commune in the Vienne department, in the region of Nouvelle-Aquitaine, western France.

The commune is listed as a Village étape.

Louis Victor de Rochechouart de Mortemart, brother of Madame de Montespan was the duc de Vivonne.

== Population ==
Historical population
Year	Pop.	±% p.a.
1968	2,362	—
1975	2,675	+1.79%
1982	2,817	+0.74%
1990	2,955	+0.60%
1999	3,028	+0.27%
2007	3,051	+0.09%
2012	3,940	+5.25%
2017	4,345	+1.98%
2023	4,550	+0.77%
Source: INSEE

== See also ==
- Communes of the Vienne department
