= Marnay, Vienne =

Marnay
- Commune
- Location of Marnay
- Location within France Location within Nouvelle-Aquitaine
- Coordinates: 46°23′49″N 0°20′36″E
- Country: France
- Region: Nouvelle-Aquitaine
- Department: Vienne
- Arrondissement: Poitiers
- Canton: Vivonne

Government
  - Mayor (2020–2026): Christian Chaplain
- Area^{1}: 45.1 km^{2} (17.4 sq mi)
- Elevation: 120 m (390 ft)
- Highest elevation: 144 m (472 ft)
- Lowest elevation: 96 m (315 ft)
- Population (2023): 713
  - Density: 15.8/km^{2} (40.9/sq mi)
- Time zone: UTC+01:00 (CET)
  - Summer (DST): UTC+02:00 (CEST)
- INSEE/Postal code: 86148 /86160
- ^{1} French Land Register data, which excludes lakes, ponds, glaciers > 1 km^{2} (0.386 sq mi or 247 acres) and river estuaries.

Marnay (French pronunciation: [maʁnɛ]) is a commune in the Vienne department in the Nouvelle-Aquitaine region in western France.

== Geography ==
The Clouère flows northwest through the middle of the commune and crosses the village.

== See also ==
- Communes of the Vienne department
