= Marçay, Vienne =

Marçay
- Commune
- Coat of arms
- Location of Marçay
- Location within France Location within Nouvelle-Aquitaine
- Coordinates: 46°27′49″N 0°13′51″E
- Country: France
- Region: Nouvelle-Aquitaine
- Department: Vienne
- Arrondissement: Poitiers
- Canton: Vivonne

Government
  - Mayor (2020–2026): Sandra Girard
- Area^{1}: 30.32 km^{2} (11.71 sq mi)
- Elevation: 105 m (344 ft)
- Highest elevation: 151 m (495 ft)
- Lowest elevation: 98 m (322 ft)
- Population (2023): 1,107
  - Density: 36.51/km^{2} (94.56/sq mi)
- Time zone: UTC+01:00 (CET)
  - Summer (DST): UTC+02:00 (CEST)
- INSEE/Postal code: 86145 /86370
- ^{1} French Land Register data, which excludes lakes, ponds, glaciers > 1 km^{2} (0.386 sq mi or 247 acres) and river estuaries.

Marçay (French pronunciation: [maʁsɛ]) is a commune in the Vienne department in the Nouvelle-Aquitaine region in western France.

== See also ==
- Communes of the Vienne department
