= Arboretum de Neuville-de-Poitou =

Arboretum in Poitou-Charentes, France

Coordinates: 46.680846°N 0.245453°E

The Arboretum de Neuville-de-Poitou is a municipal arboretum located in Neuville-de-Poitou, Vienne, Poitou-Charentes, France. The arboretum was created along a former railway track, and now displays 380 types of trees and shrubs planted along a 3-kilometer walking path. It is open daily without charge.

== See also ==
- List of botanical gardens in France
