= Brux, Vienne =

Brux
- Commune
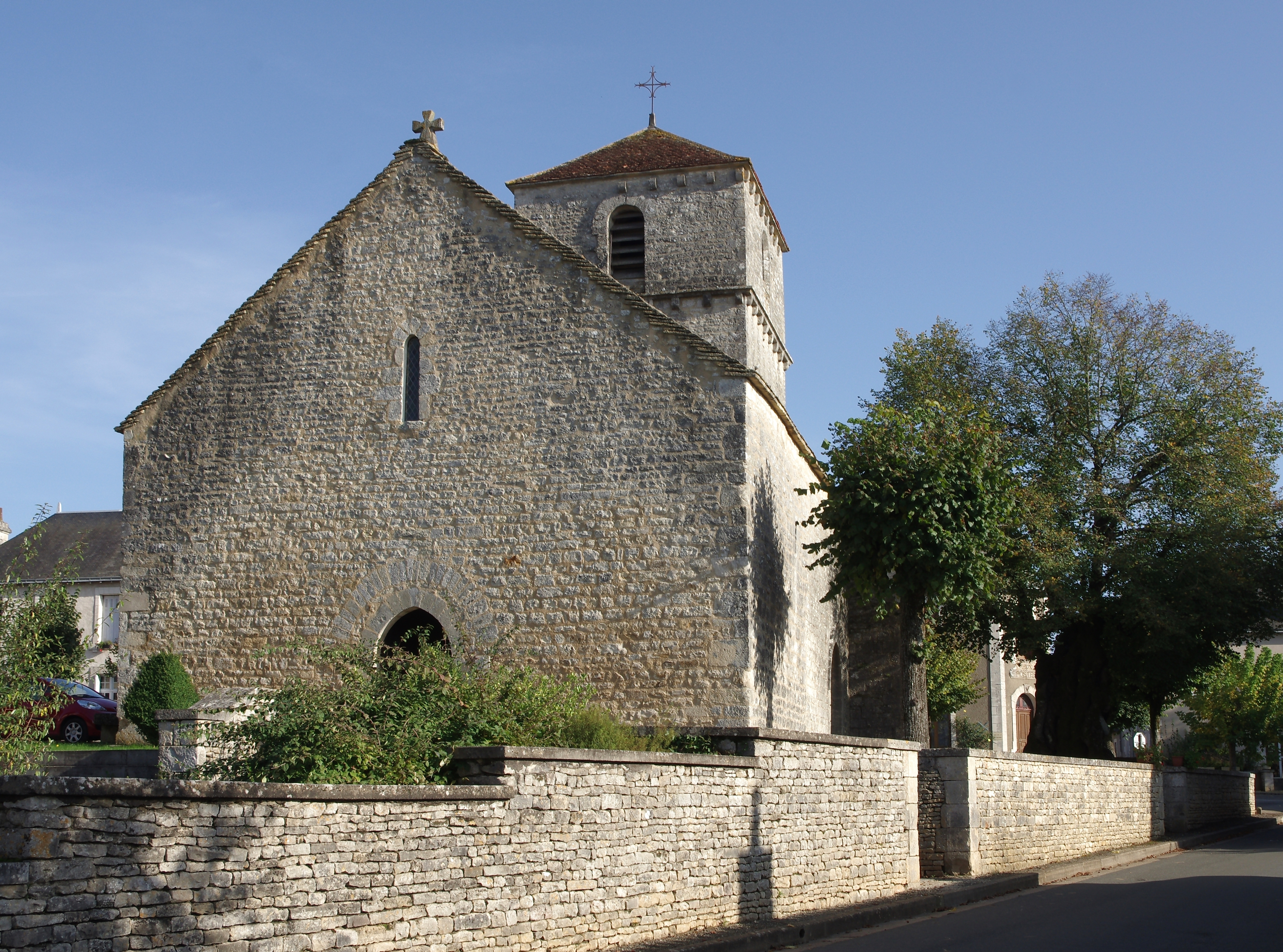
- St Martin's church in Brux
- Location of Brux
- Location within France Location within Nouvelle-Aquitaine
- Coordinates: 46°14′11″N 0°11′40″E
- Country: France
- Region: Nouvelle-Aquitaine
- Department: Vienne
- Arrondissement: Montmorillon
- Canton: Lusignan

Government
  - Mayor (2020–2026): Frédéric Texier
- Area^{1}: 35.91 km^{2} (13.86 sq mi)
- Elevation: 126 m (413 ft)
- Highest elevation: 154 m (505 ft)
- Lowest elevation: 117 m (384 ft)
- Population (2023): 777
  - Density: 21.6/km^{2} (56.0/sq mi)
- Time zone: UTC+01:00 (CET)
  - Summer (DST): UTC+02:00 (CEST)
- INSEE/Postal code: 86039 /86510
- ^{1} French Land Register data, which excludes lakes, ponds, glaciers > 1 km^{2} (0.386 sq mi or 247 acres) and river estuaries.

Brux is a commune in the Vienne department and Nouvelle-Aquitaine region of western France.

== See also ==
- Communes of the Vienne department
