= Nieuil-l'Espoir =

- Commune
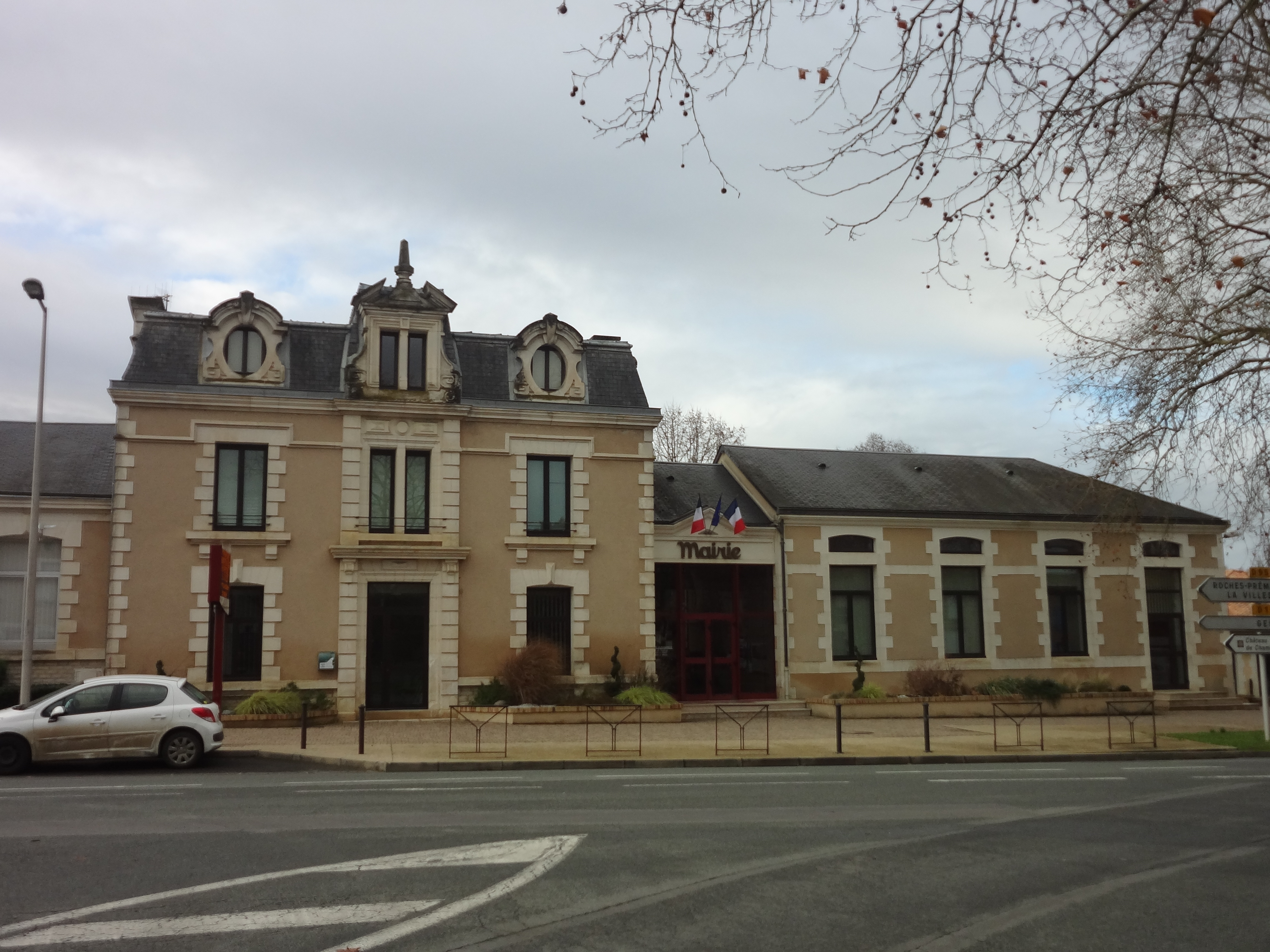
- The town hall in Nieuil-L'Espoir
- Location of Nieuil-l'Espoir
- Location within France Location within Nouvelle-Aquitaine
- Coordinates: 46°28′59″N 0°27′18″E
- Country: France
- Region: Nouvelle-Aquitaine
- Department: Vienne
- Arrondissement: Poitiers
- Canton: Vivonne

Government
  - Mayor (2020–2026): Gilbert Beaujaneau
- Area^{1}: 20.64 km^{2} (7.97 sq mi)
- Elevation: 120 m (390 ft)
- Highest elevation: 136 m (446 ft)
- Lowest elevation: 108 m (354 ft)
- Population (2023): 2,631
  - Density: 127.5/km^{2} (330.1/sq mi)
- Time zone: UTC+01:00 (CET)
  - Summer (DST): UTC+02:00 (CEST)
- INSEE/Postal code: 86178 /86340
- ^{1} French Land Register data, which excludes lakes, ponds, glaciers > 1 km^{2} (0.386 sq mi or 247 acres) and river estuaries.

Nieuil-l'Espoir (French pronunciation: [njœj lɛspwaʁ]) is a commune in the Vienne department in the Nouvelle-Aquitaine region in western France.

== Population ==
Historical population
Year	Pop.	±% p.a.
1968	662	—
1975	920	+4.81%
1982	1,193	+3.78%
1990	1,554	+3.36%
1999	1,904	+2.28%
2007	2,220	+1.94%
2012	2,401	+1.58%
2017	2,718	+2.51%
2023	2,631	−0.54%
Source: INSEE

== See also ==
- Communes of the Vienne department
