= Jardin botanique universitaire de Poitiers =

Botanical garden in France

Coordinates: 46.5565°N 0.4092°E

The Jardin botanique universitaire de Poitiers (33 hectares) is a botanical garden and arboretum maintained by the University of Poitiers. It is located at 443 Route du deffend, Mignaloux-Beauvoir, Vienne, Nouvelle-Aquitaine, France, and open daily without charge.

The garden is located on the former domaine du Deffend, which was purchased by the state in 1962 and established as a regional plant heritage centre in 1996. It was named a botanical garden in 2005 with the following missions:

- conservation of regional plants by developing thematic gardens (fruits, vegetables, etc.)
- education and public awareness
- supporting university research
- preservation of heritage collections of the University of Poitiers, including a herbarium dating to the nineteenth century,

Today the garden contains two small forests (6 hectares), two ponds, a farm dating to the nineteenth century, and a 17th-century dovecote. Its arboretum contains 90 oak taxa, as well as a good collection of heritage apple trees. Other collections include local orchids, aquatic plants, and medicinal plants.

== See also ==
- List of botanical gardens in France
