= Curzay-sur-Vonne =

- Commune
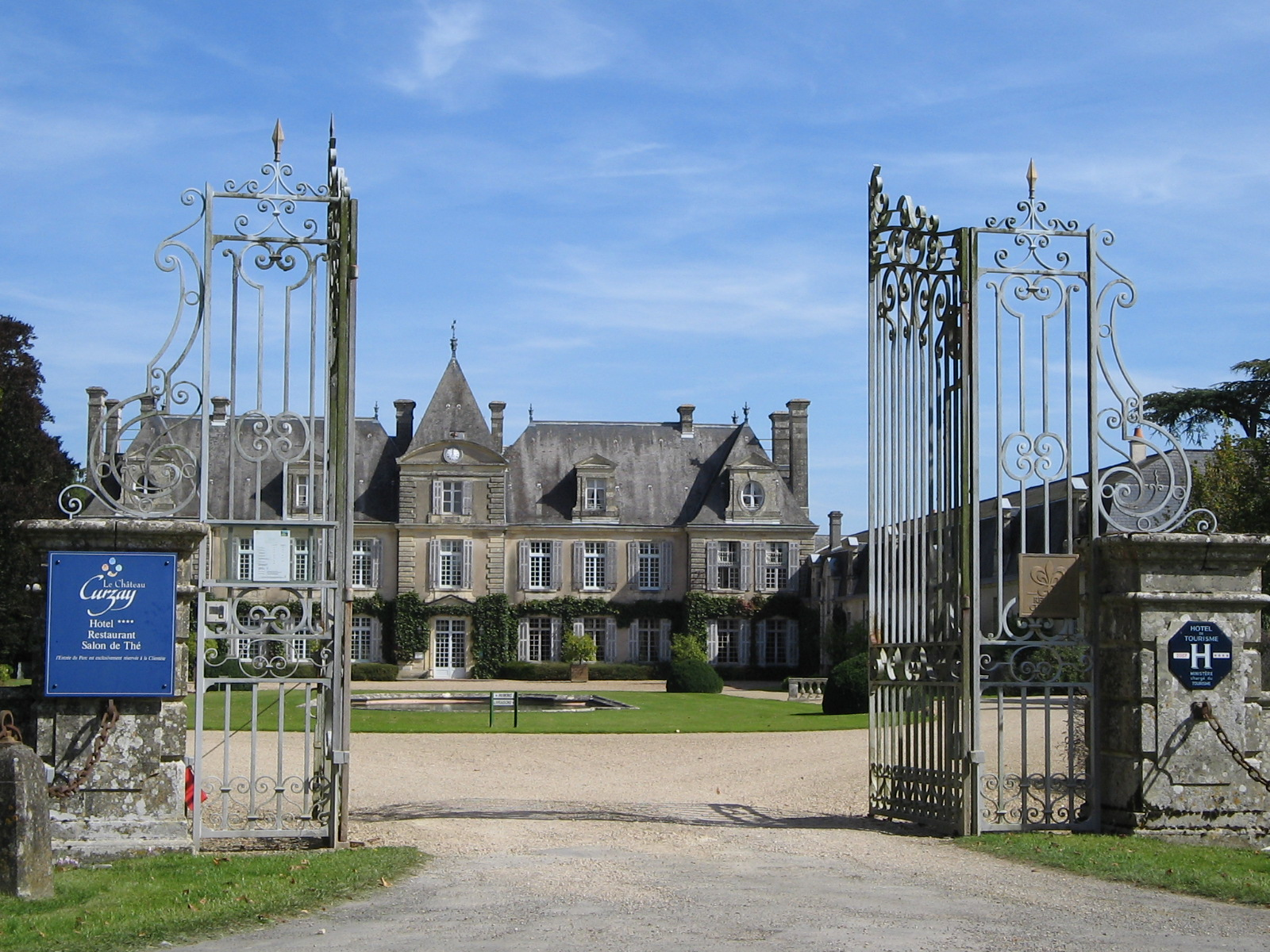
- The Château of Curzay, in Curzay-sur-Vonne
- Location of Curzay-sur-Vonne
- Location within France Location within Nouvelle-Aquitaine
- Coordinates: 46°29′30″N 0°02′47″E
- Country: France
- Region: Nouvelle-Aquitaine
- Department: Vienne
- Arrondissement: Poitiers
- Canton: Lusignan
- Intercommunality: CU Grand Poitiers

Government
  - Mayor (2022–2026): Rozenn Sénélas
- Area^{1}: 16.52 km^{2} (6.38 sq mi)
- Highest elevation: 159 m (522 ft)
- Lowest elevation: 109 m (358 ft)
- Population (2023): 380
  - Density: 23/km^{2} (60/sq mi)
- Time zone: UTC+01:00 (CET)
  - Summer (DST): UTC+02:00 (CEST)
- INSEE/Postal code: 86091 /86600
- ^{1} French Land Register data, which excludes lakes, ponds, glaciers > 1 km^{2} (0.386 sq mi or 247 acres) and river estuaries.

Curzay-sur-Vonne is a commune in the Vienne department in the Nouvelle-Aquitaine region in western France.

== See also ==
- Communes of the Vienne department
