= Amberre =

- Commune
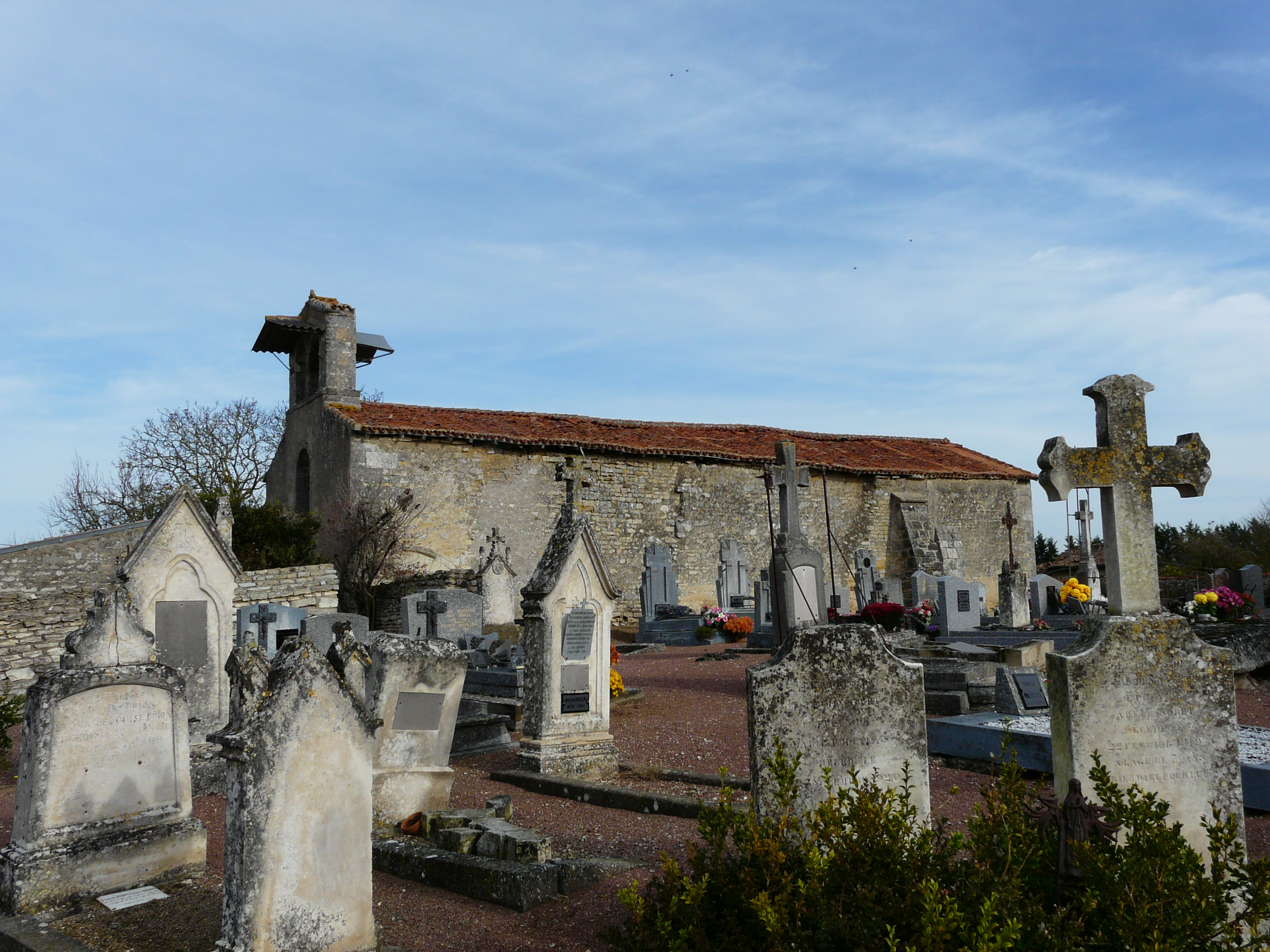
- The church of Saint-Martin of Bournezeau

- Coat of arms
- Location of Amberre
- Location within France Location within Nouvelle-Aquitaine
- Coordinates: 46°46′02″N 0°09′56″E
- Country: France
- Region: Nouvelle-Aquitaine
- Department: Vienne
- Arrondissement: Poitiers
- Canton: Migné-Auxances
- Intercommunality: CC Haut-Poitou

Government
  - Mayor (2020–2026): Celine Plisson
- Area^{1}: 15.63 km^{2} (6.03 sq mi)
- Highest elevation: 123 m (404 ft)
- Lowest elevation: 88 m (289 ft)
- Population (2023): 565
  - Density: 36.1/km^{2} (93.6/sq mi)
- Time zone: UTC+01:00 (CET)
  - Summer (DST): UTC+02:00 (CEST)
- INSEE/Postal code: 86002 /86110
- ^{1} French Land Register data, which excludes lakes, ponds, glaciers > 1 km^{2} (0.386 sq mi or 247 acres) and river estuaries.

Amberre (French pronunciation: [ɑ̃bɛʁ]) is a commune in the Vienne department in the Nouvelle-Aquitaine region in western France.

== See also ==
- Communes of the Vienne department
