= Roches-Prémarie-Andillé =

- Commune
- Location of Roches-Prémarie-Andillé
- Location within France Location within Nouvelle-Aquitaine
- Coordinates: 46°28′58″N 0°22′18″E
- Country: France
- Region: Nouvelle-Aquitaine
- Department: Vienne
- Arrondissement: Poitiers
- Canton: Vivonne

Government
  - Mayor (2020–2026): Rémi Marchadier
- Area^{1}: 22.37 km^{2} (8.64 sq mi)
- Elevation: 120 m (390 ft)
- Highest elevation: 138 m (453 ft)
- Lowest elevation: 82 m (269 ft)
- Population (2023): 2,191
  - Density: 97.94/km^{2} (253.7/sq mi)
- Time zone: UTC+01:00 (CET)
  - Summer (DST): UTC+02:00 (CEST)
- INSEE/Postal code: 86209 /86340
- ^{1} French Land Register data, which excludes lakes, ponds, glaciers > 1 km^{2} (0.386 sq mi or 247 acres) and river estuaries.

Roches-Prémarie-Andillé (French pronunciation: [ʁɔʃ pʁemaʁi ɑ̃dije]) is a commune in the Vienne department in the Nouvelle-Aquitaine region in western France.

== Population ==
Historical population
Year	Pop.	±% p.a.
1968	685	—
1975	1,020	+5.85%
1982	1,378	+4.39%
1990	1,487	+0.96%
1999	1,544	+0.42%
2007	1,638	+0.74%
2012	1,894	+2.95%
2017	2,021	+1.31%
2023	2,191	+1.36%
Source: INSEE

== See also ==
- Communes of the Vienne department
