= La Villedieu-du-Clain =

- Commune
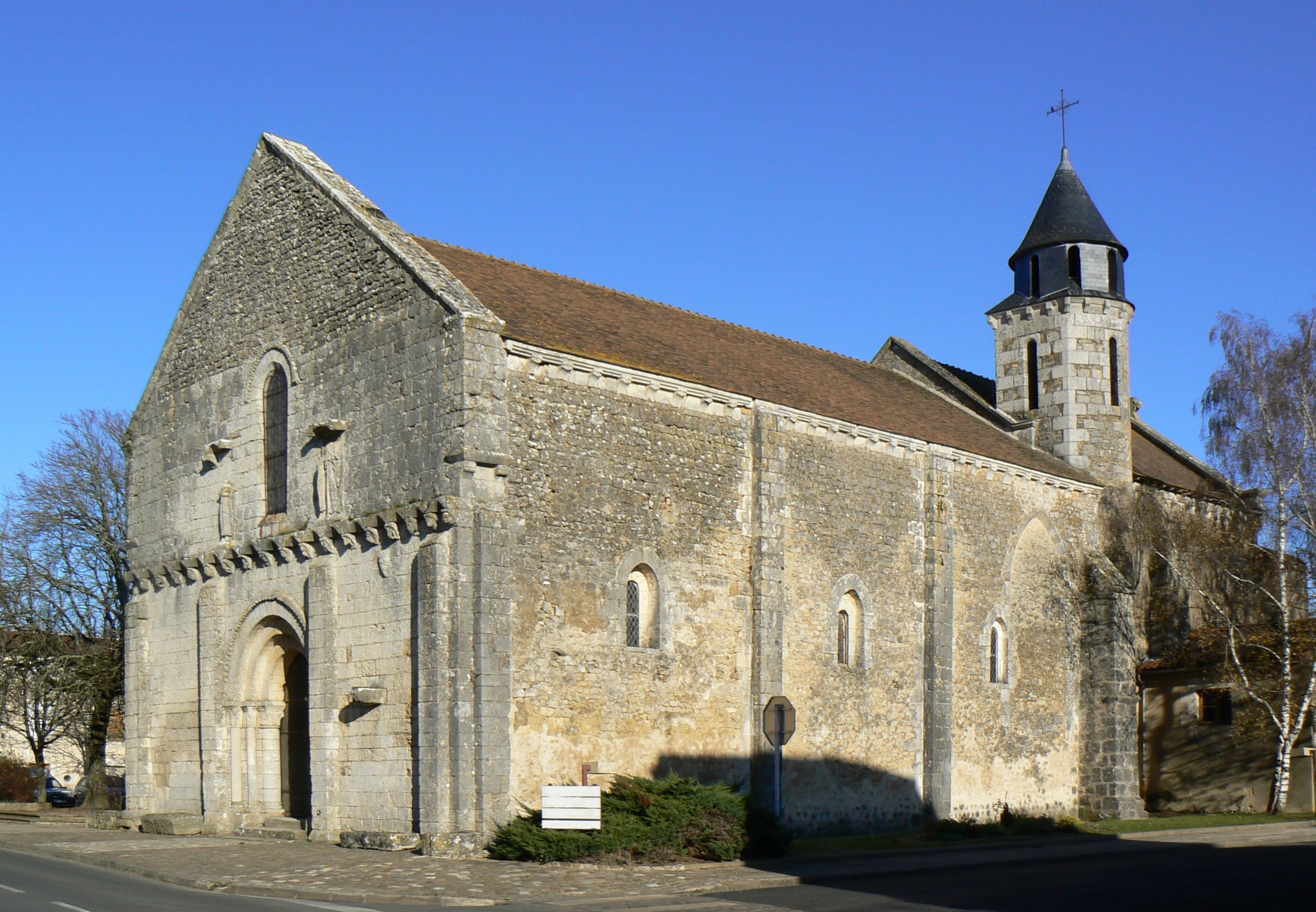
- Church in La Villedieu-du-Clain

- Coat of arms
- Location of La Villedieu-du-Clain
- Location within France Location within Nouvelle-Aquitaine
- Coordinates: 46°27′23″N 0°22′09″E
- Country: France
- Region: Nouvelle-Aquitaine
- Department: Vienne
- Arrondissement: Poitiers
- Canton: Vivonne

Government
  - Mayor (2022–2026): Michele Boutillet
- Area^{1}: 7.16 km^{2} (2.76 sq mi)
- Elevation: 140 m (460 ft)
- Highest elevation: 145 m (476 ft)
- Lowest elevation: 119 m (390 ft)
- Population (2023): 1,512
  - Density: 211/km^{2} (547/sq mi)
- Time zone: UTC+01:00 (CET)
  - Summer (DST): UTC+02:00 (CEST)
- INSEE/Postal code: 86290 /86340
- ^{1} French Land Register data, which excludes lakes, ponds, glaciers > 1 km^{2} (0.386 sq mi or 247 acres) and river estuaries.

La Villedieu-du-Clain (French pronunciation: [la vildjø dy klɛ̃]) is a commune in the Vienne department in the Nouvelle-Aquitaine region in western France.

== See also ==
- Communes of the Vienne department
