= Croutelle =

- Commune
- Location of Croutelle
- Location within France Location within Nouvelle-Aquitaine
- Coordinates: 46°32′15″N 0°17′21″E
- Country: France
- Region: Nouvelle-Aquitaine
- Department: Vienne
- Arrondissement: Poitiers
- Canton: Poitiers-1
- Intercommunality: CU Grand Poitiers

Government
  - Mayor (2020–2026): Arnaud Rousseau
- Area^{1}: 1.48 km^{2} (0.57 sq mi)
- Elevation: 83 m (272 ft)
- Highest elevation: 147 m (482 ft)
- Lowest elevation: 100 m (330 ft)
- Population (2023): 946
  - Density: 639/km^{2} (1,660/sq mi)
- Time zone: UTC+01:00 (CET)
  - Summer (DST): UTC+02:00 (CEST)
- INSEE/Postal code: 86088 /86240
- ^{1} French Land Register data, which excludes lakes, ponds, glaciers > 1 km^{2} (0.386 sq mi or 247 acres) and river estuaries.

Croutelle (French pronunciation: [kʁutɛl]) is a commune in the Vienne department in the Nouvelle-Aquitaine region in western France.

== See also ==
- Communes of the Vienne department
