= Maisonneuve, Vienne =

Maisonneuve
- Commune
- Location of Maisonneuve
- Location within France Location within Nouvelle-Aquitaine
- Coordinates: 46°43′21″N 0°03′27″E
- Country: France
- Region: Nouvelle-Aquitaine
- Department: Vienne
- Arrondissement: Poitiers
- Canton: Migné-Auxances

Government
  - Mayor (2020–2026): Jacques Rolland
- Area^{1}: 8.97 km^{2} (3.46 sq mi)
- Elevation: 115 m (377 ft)
- Highest elevation: 140 m (460 ft)
- Lowest elevation: 113 m (371 ft)
- Population (2023): 319
  - Density: 35.6/km^{2} (92.1/sq mi)
- Time zone: UTC+01:00 (CET)
  - Summer (DST): UTC+02:00 (CEST)
- INSEE/Postal code: 86144 /86170
- ^{1} French Land Register data, which excludes lakes, ponds, glaciers > 1 km^{2} (0.386 sq mi or 247 acres) and river estuaries.

Maisonneuve (French pronunciation: [mɛzɔ̃.nœv]) is a commune in the Vienne department in the Nouvelle-Aquitaine region in western France.

== See also ==
- Communes of the Vienne department
