= Yversay =

- Commune
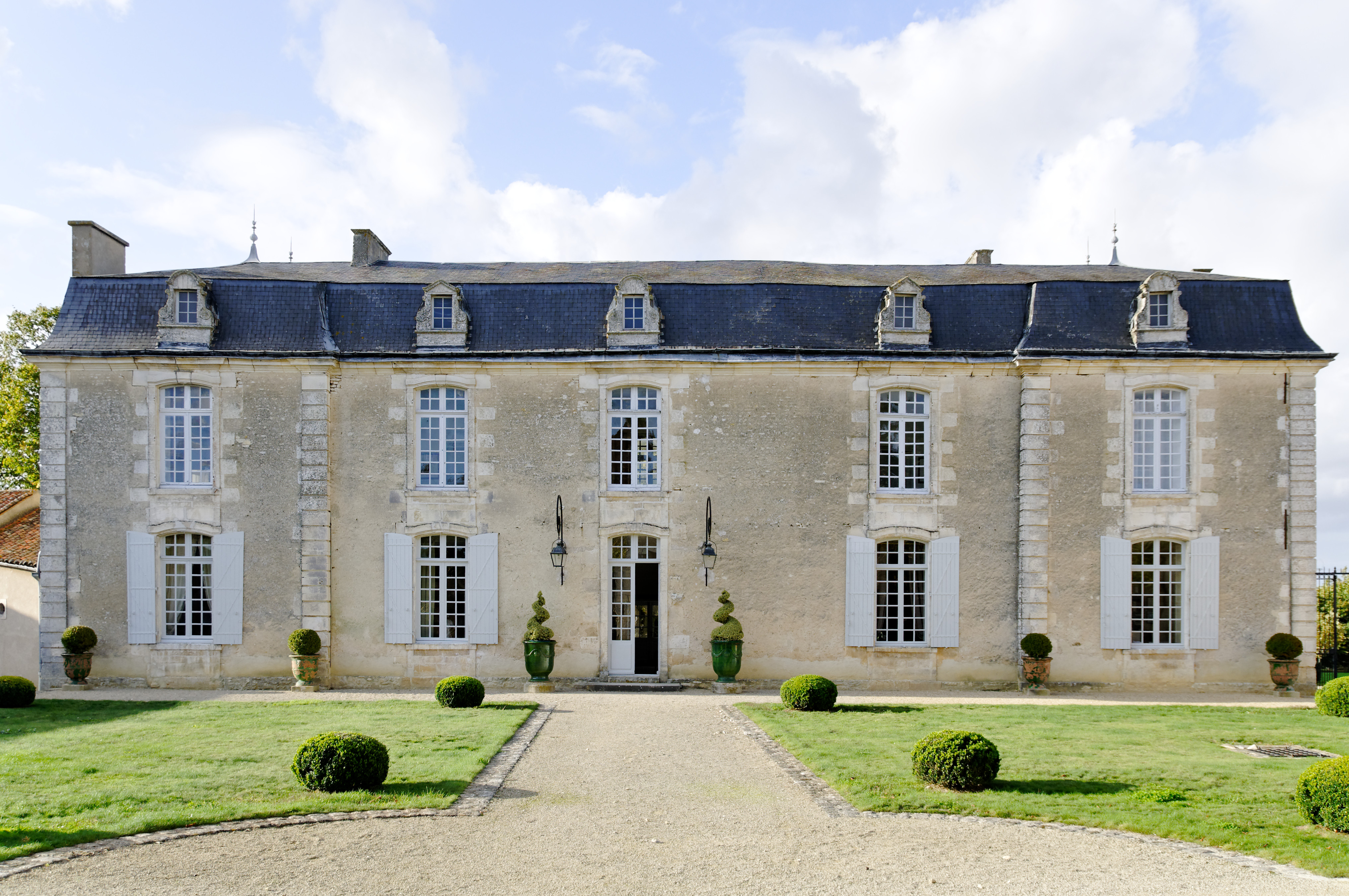
- The Château of Yversay
- Location of Yversay
- Location within France Location within Nouvelle-Aquitaine
- Coordinates: 46°40′46″N 0°12′59″E
- Country: France
- Region: Nouvelle-Aquitaine
- Department: Vienne
- Arrondissement: Poitiers
- Canton: Migné-Auxances
- Intercommunality: Haut-Poitou

Government
  - Mayor (2023–2026): Anthony Lamy
- Area^{1}: 5.95 km^{2} (2.30 sq mi)
- Elevation: 170 m (560 ft)
- Highest elevation: 142 m (466 ft)
- Lowest elevation: 109 m (358 ft)
- Population (2023): 611
  - Density: 103/km^{2} (266/sq mi)
- Time zone: UTC+01:00 (CET)
  - Summer (DST): UTC+02:00 (CEST)
- INSEE/Postal code: 86300 /86170
- ^{1} French Land Register data, which excludes lakes, ponds, glaciers > 1 km^{2} (0.386 sq mi or 247 acres) and river estuaries.

Yversay (French pronunciation: [ivɛʁsɛ]) is a commune in the Vienne department in the Nouvelle-Aquitaine region in western France.

== Population ==
Historical population
| Year | Pop. | ±% p.a. |
|---|---|---|
| 1968 | 217 | — |
| 1975 | 182 | −2.48% |
| 1982 | 220 | +2.75% |
| 1990 | 237 | +0.93% |
| 1999 | 246 | +0.41% |
| 2007 | 258 | +0.60% |
| 2012 | 358 | +6.77% |
| 2017 | 529 | +8.12% |
| 2023 | 611 | +2.43% |
Source: INSEE

== See also ==
- Communes of the Vienne department
