= Jazeneuil =

- Commune
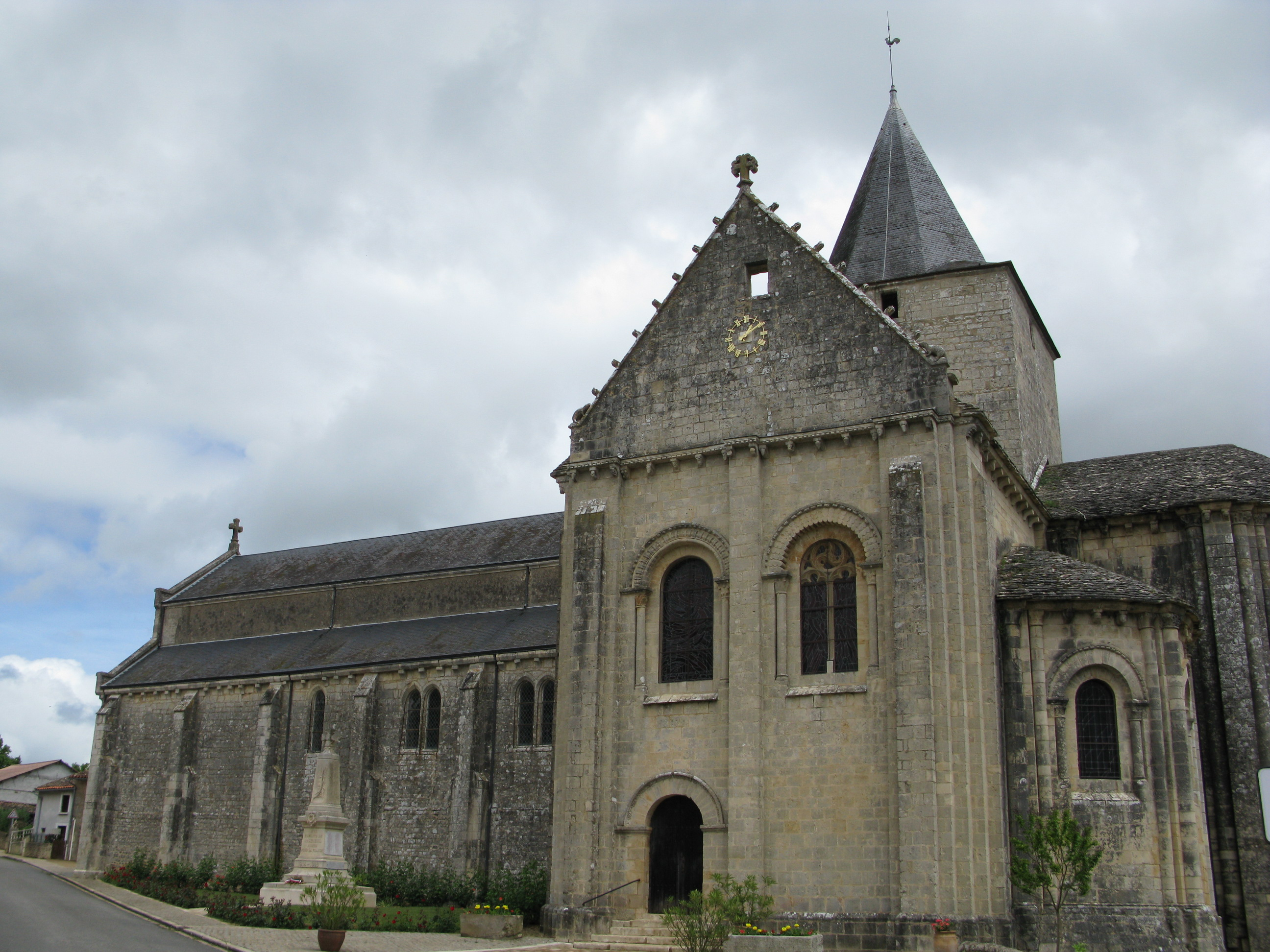
- The church of Saint-Jean-Baptiste, in Jazeneuil
- Location of Jazeneuil
- Location within France Location within Nouvelle-Aquitaine
- Coordinates: 46°27′57″N 0°04′11″E
- Country: France
- Region: Nouvelle-Aquitaine
- Department: Vienne
- Arrondissement: Poitiers
- Canton: Lusignan
- Intercommunality: CU Grand Poitiers

Government
  - Mayor (2020–2026): Bernard Chauvet
- Area^{1}: 31.82 km^{2} (12.29 sq mi)
- Highest elevation: 157 m (515 ft)
- Lowest elevation: 107 m (351 ft)
- Population (2023): 793
  - Density: 24.9/km^{2} (64.5/sq mi)
- Time zone: UTC+01:00 (CET)
  - Summer (DST): UTC+02:00 (CEST)
- INSEE/Postal code: 86116 /86600
- ^{1} French Land Register data, which excludes lakes, ponds, glaciers > 1 km^{2} (0.386 sq mi or 247 acres) and river estuaries.

Jazeneuil (French pronunciation: [ʒaznœj]) is a commune in the Vienne department in the Nouvelle-Aquitaine region in western France.

== Notable people ==
- Charles Lamberton (1876–1960), paleontologist, born in Jazeneuil

== See also ==
- Communes of the Vienne department
