= Iteuil =

- Commune
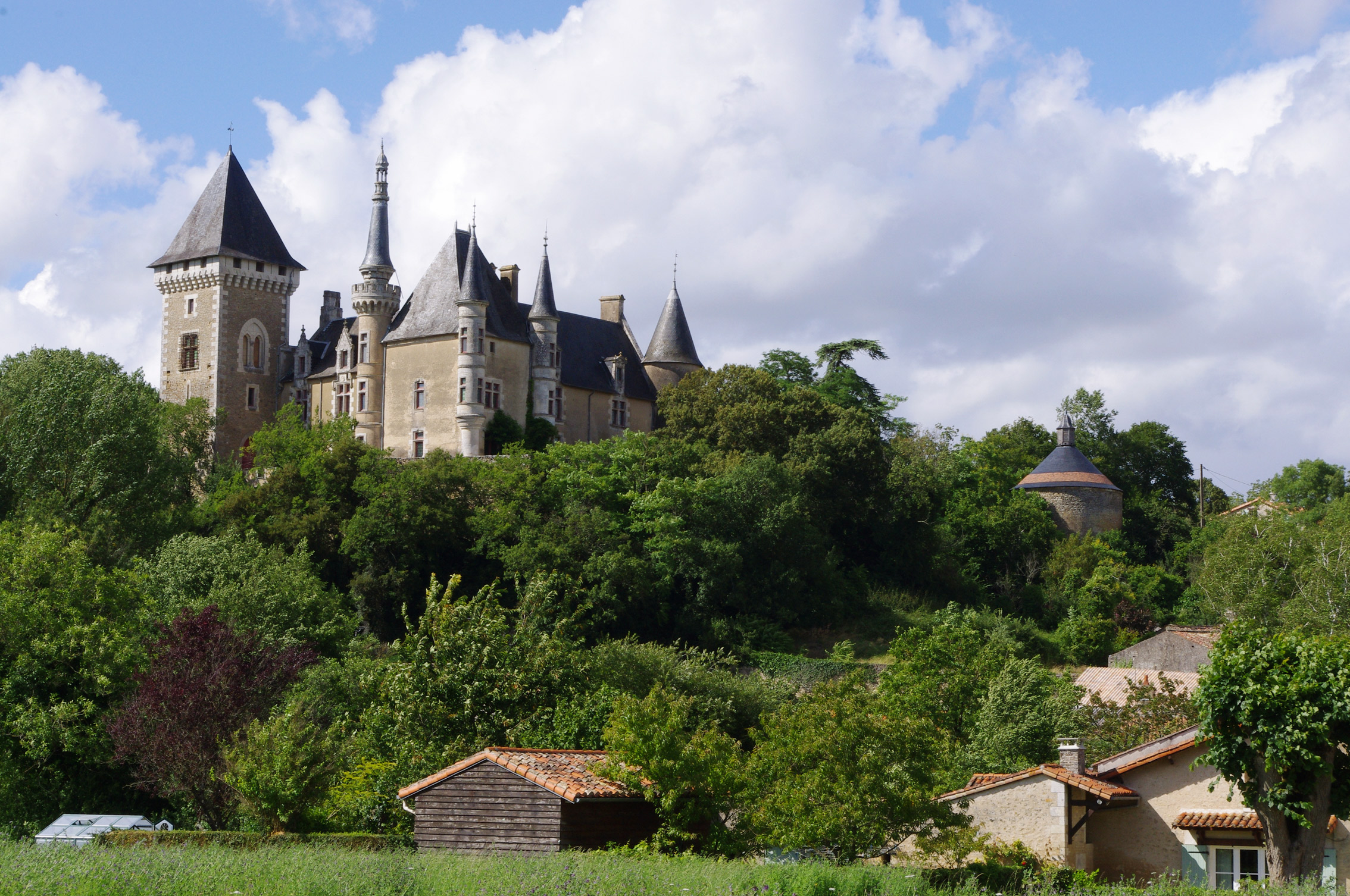
- The Château-d'Aigne, next to the village of Iteuil
- Location of Iteuil
- Location within France Location within Nouvelle-Aquitaine
- Coordinates: 46°29′22″N 0°18′45″E
- Country: France
- Region: Nouvelle-Aquitaine
- Department: Vienne
- Arrondissement: Poitiers
- Canton: Vivonne

Government
  - Mayor (2020–2026): Françoise Micault
- Area^{1}: 22.05 km^{2} (8.51 sq mi)
- Highest elevation: 146 m (479 ft)
- Lowest elevation: 77 m (253 ft)
- Population (2023): 2,989
  - Density: 135.6/km^{2} (351.1/sq mi)
- Time zone: UTC+01:00 (CET)
  - Summer (DST): UTC+02:00 (CEST)
- INSEE/Postal code: 86113 /86240
- ^{1} French Land Register data, which excludes lakes, ponds, glaciers > 1 km^{2} (0.386 sq mi or 247 acres) and river estuaries.

Iteuil (French pronunciation: [itœj]) is a commune in the Vienne department in the Nouvelle-Aquitaine region in western France.

== Population ==
Historical population
Year	Pop.	±% p.a.
1968	1,374	—
1975	1,859	+4.41%
1982	2,309	+3.15%
1990	2,679	+1.88%
1999	2,814	+0.55%
2007	2,829	+0.07%
2012	2,870	+0.29%
2017	2,940	+0.48%
2023	2,989	+0.28%
Source: INSEE

== See also ==
- Communes of the Vienne department
