= Massognes =

- Commune
- Coat of arms
- Location of Massognes
- Location within France Location within Nouvelle-Aquitaine
- Coordinates: 46°44′33″N 0°03′45″E
- Country: France
- Region: Nouvelle-Aquitaine
- Department: Vienne
- Arrondissement: Poitiers
- Canton: Migné-Auxances

Government
  - Mayor (2020–2026): Jean-Jacques Dussoul
- Area^{1}: 13.59 km^{2} (5.25 sq mi)
- Elevation: 110 m (360 ft)
- Highest elevation: 140 m (460 ft)
- Lowest elevation: 90 m (300 ft)
- Population (2023): 274
  - Density: 20.2/km^{2} (52.2/sq mi)
- Time zone: UTC+01:00 (CET)
  - Summer (DST): UTC+02:00 (CEST)
- INSEE/Postal code: 86150 /86170
- ^{1} French Land Register data, which excludes lakes, ponds, glaciers > 1 km^{2} (0.386 sq mi or 247 acres) and river estuaries.

Massognes (French pronunciation: [masɔɲ]) is a commune in the Vienne department in the Nouvelle-Aquitaine region in western France.

== See also ==
- Communes of the Vienne department
