= Dienné =

- Commune
- Location of Dienné
- Location within France Location within Nouvelle-Aquitaine
- Coordinates: 46°26′33″N 0°32′55″E
- Country: France
- Region: Nouvelle-Aquitaine
- Department: Vienne
- Arrondissement: Poitiers
- Canton: Vivonne

Government
  - Mayor (2020–2026): Carine Mames
- Area^{1}: 16.56 km^{2} (6.39 sq mi)
- Elevation: 212 m (696 ft)
- Highest elevation: 139 m (456 ft)
- Lowest elevation: 101 m (331 ft)
- Population (2023): 581
  - Density: 35.1/km^{2} (90.9/sq mi)
- Time zone: UTC+01:00 (CET)
  - Summer (DST): UTC+02:00 (CEST)
- INSEE/Postal code: 86094 /86410
- ^{1} French Land Register data, which excludes lakes, ponds, glaciers > 1 km^{2} (0.386 sq mi or 247 acres) and river estuaries.

Dienné (French pronunciation: [djene]) is a commune in the Vienne department in the Nouvelle-Aquitaine region in western France.

== See also ==
- Communes of the Vienne department
