= Neuville-de-Poitou =

- Commune
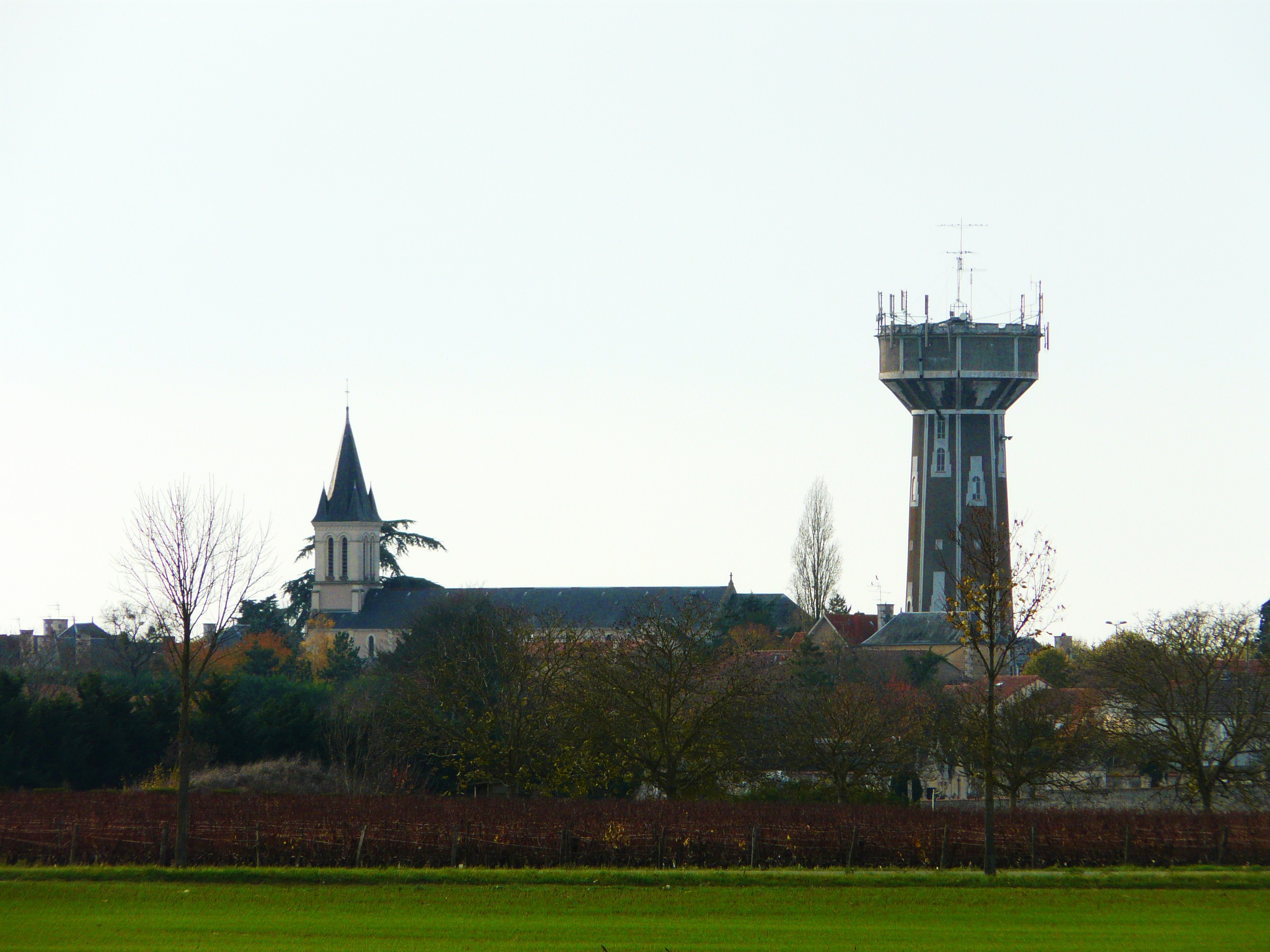
- The church and the water tower

- Coat of arms
- Location of Neuville-de-Poitou
- Location within France Location within Nouvelle-Aquitaine
- Coordinates: 46°41′10″N 0°14′45″E
- Country: France
- Region: Nouvelle-Aquitaine
- Department: Vienne
- Arrondissement: Poitiers
- Canton: Migné-Auxances

Government
  - Mayor (2020–2026): Séverine Saint-Pé
- Area^{1}: 17.06 km^{2} (6.59 sq mi)
- Elevation: 128 m (420 ft)
- Highest elevation: 140 m (460 ft)
- Lowest elevation: 91 m (299 ft)
- Population (2023): 5,513
  - Density: 323.2/km^{2} (837.0/sq mi)
- Time zone: UTC+01:00 (CET)
  - Summer (DST): UTC+02:00 (CEST)
- INSEE/Postal code: 86177 /86170
- ^{1} French Land Register data, which excludes lakes, ponds, glaciers > 1 km^{2} (0.386 sq mi or 247 acres) and river estuaries.

Neuville-de-Poitou (French pronunciation: [nøvil də pwatu]) is a commune in the Vienne department in the Nouvelle-Aquitaine region in western France.

== History ==
Neuville was first named Nova Villa in 876, through a donation by a Frank by the name of Aldurus, at abbaye Saint-Hilaire de Poitiers. During the Hundred Years' War, Neuville suffered because of its precarious position between the two kingdoms. Like most of Poitou, it became subject to English control in 1360. In 1410 the parish reorganized itself and took the name of Notre-Dame de Neuville. Commerce and crafts developed, and soon the population was doing well. (wine, wheat, wool, cattle and mules)

The war of religion divided the country. Plague hit the region between 1628 and 1632. In 1750, Neuville only had 403 people, whereas her rival, Vendeuvre had 613.

During the French Revolution, conscription provoked many incidents, and the castle of the area, le château de Bellefois was destroyed. In 1790, Neuville became the primary town of the township.

The beginning of the 19th century ruined many home owners. The land then went back to the former farmers. Many immigrate to find work. It is during this period that Neuville is named in Québec.

In 1958, the commune of Neuville takes the official name of Neuville-de-Poitou

== Population ==
Historical population
Year	Pop.	±% p.a.
1968	3,104	—
1975	3,312	+0.93%
1982	3,623	+1.29%
1990	3,840	+0.73%
1999	4,058	+0.62%
2007	4,799	+2.12%
2012	5,265	+1.87%
2017	5,324	+0.22%
2023	5,513	+0.58%
Source: INSEE

== Twin towns ==
- Neuville, Quebec, Canada
- Desborough in Northamptonshire, England
- Saratov in Volga, Russia
- Soure in Coimbra, Portugal

== Points of interest ==
- Arboretum de Neuville-de-Poitou

== See also ==
- Communes of the Vienne department

Huilerie Jacques Batard, Vegetable and Nut Oil makers, Founded in 1850 is the last Oil Mill remaining in the area. Stone mill
