= Thurageau =

- Commune
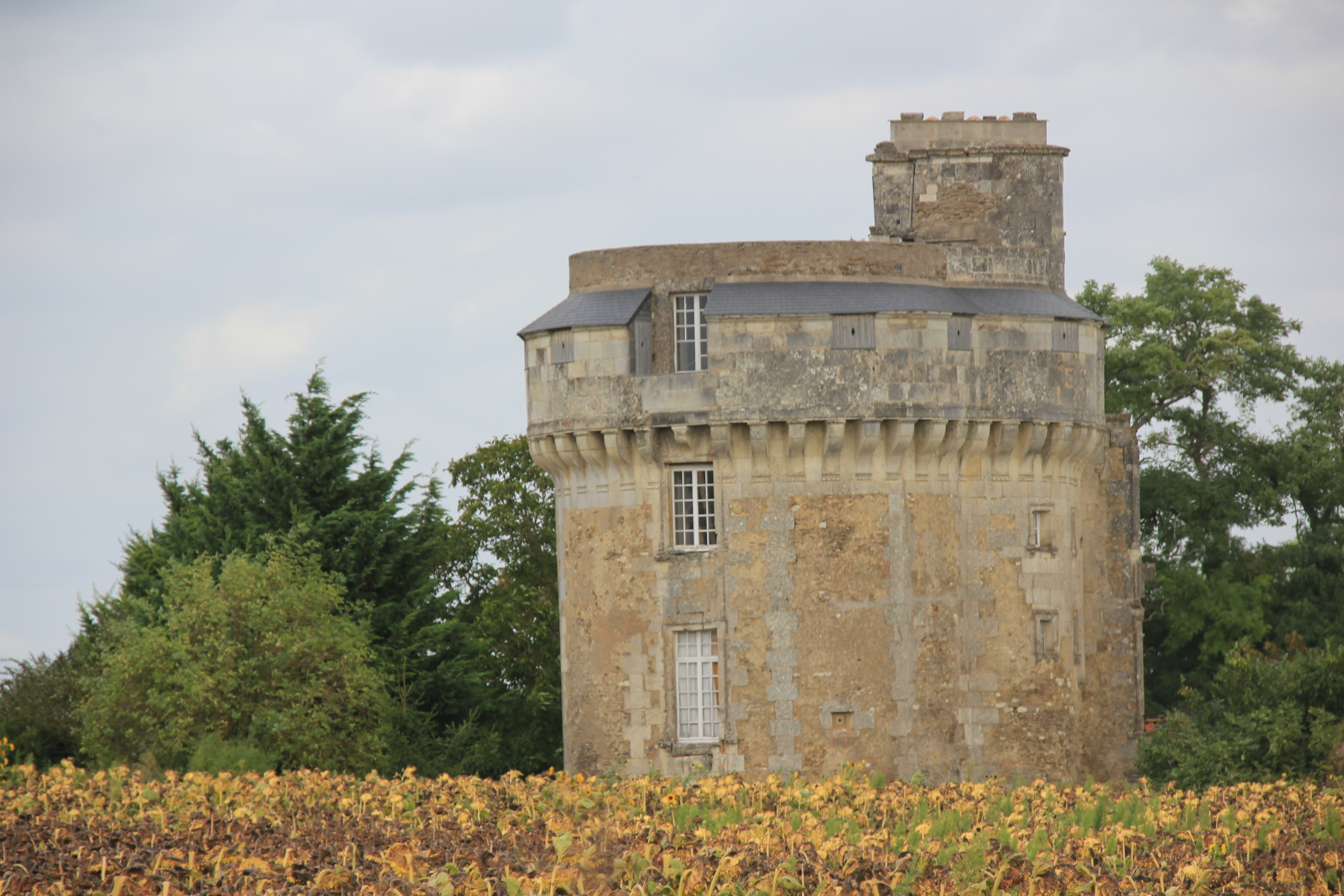
- The Château of Abain, in Thurageau
- Location of Thurageau
- Location within France Location within Nouvelle-Aquitaine
- Coordinates: 46°46′08″N 0°14′36″E
- Country: France
- Region: Nouvelle-Aquitaine
- Department: Vienne
- Arrondissement: Poitiers
- Canton: Migné-Auxances

Government
  - Mayor (2020–2026): Marie-Claire Pelletier
- Area^{1}: 35.29 km^{2} (13.63 sq mi)
- Elevation: 120 m (390 ft)
- Highest elevation: 161 m (528 ft)
- Lowest elevation: 71 m (233 ft)
- Population (2023): 720
  - Density: 20/km^{2} (53/sq mi)
- Time zone: UTC+01:00 (CET)
  - Summer (DST): UTC+02:00 (CEST)
- INSEE/Postal code: 86271 /86110
- ^{1} French Land Register data, which excludes lakes, ponds, glaciers > 1 km^{2} (0.386 sq mi or 247 acres) and river estuaries.

Thurageau (French pronunciation: [tyʁaʒo]) is a commune in the Vienne department in the Nouvelle-Aquitaine region in western France.

== See also ==
- Communes of the Vienne department
