= Gizay =

- Commune
- Location of Gizay
- Location within France Location within Nouvelle-Aquitaine
- Coordinates: 46°26′28″N 0°25′30″E
- Country: France
- Region: Nouvelle-Aquitaine
- Department: Vienne
- Arrondissement: Poitiers
- Canton: Vivonne

Government
  - Mayor (2020–2026): Jean-Yves Grassien
- Area^{1}: 20.76 km^{2} (8.02 sq mi)
- Elevation: 118 m (387 ft)
- Highest elevation: 138 m (453 ft)
- Lowest elevation: 112 m (367 ft)
- Population (2023): 364
  - Density: 17.5/km^{2} (45.4/sq mi)
- Time zone: UTC+01:00 (CET)
  - Summer (DST): UTC+02:00 (CEST)
- INSEE/Postal code: 86105 /86340
- ^{1} French Land Register data, which excludes lakes, ponds, glaciers > 1 km^{2} (0.386 sq mi or 247 acres) and river estuaries.

Gizay (French pronunciation: [ʒizɛ]) is a commune in the Vienne department in the Nouvelle-Aquitaine region in western France. The inhabitants are called Gizayens.

== Sights ==
- Château de Chambonneau

== See also ==
- Communes of the Vienne department
