= Fontaine-le-Comte =

- Commune
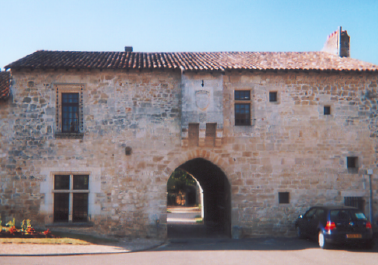
- The abbey house, in Fontaine-le-Comte
- Location of Fontaine-le-Comte
- Location within France Location within Nouvelle-Aquitaine
- Coordinates: 46°31′47″N 0°15′47″E
- Country: France
- Region: Nouvelle-Aquitaine
- Department: Vienne
- Arrondissement: Poitiers
- Canton: Poitiers-1
- Intercommunality: CU Grand Poitiers

Government
  - Mayor (2020–2026): Sylvie Aubert
- Area^{1}: 18.66 km^{2} (7.20 sq mi)
- Elevation: 118 m (387 ft)
- Highest elevation: 151 m (495 ft)
- Lowest elevation: 101 m (331 ft)
- Population (2023): 3,972
  - Density: 212.9/km^{2} (551.3/sq mi)
- Time zone: UTC+01:00 (CET)
  - Summer (DST): UTC+02:00 (CEST)
- INSEE/Postal code: 86100 /86240
- ^{1} French Land Register data, which excludes lakes, ponds, glaciers > 1 km^{2} (0.386 sq mi or 247 acres) and river estuaries.

Fontaine-le-Comte (French pronunciation: [fɔ̃tɛn lə kɔ̃t]) is a commune in the Vienne department in the Nouvelle-Aquitaine region in western France.

== Population ==
Historical population
Year	Pop.	±% p.a.
1968	655	—
1975	1,034	+6.74%
1982	2,198	+11.37%
1990	2,730	+2.75%
1999	3,113	+1.47%
2007	3,408	+1.14%
2012	3,818	+2.30%
2017	3,853	+0.18%
2023	3,972	+0.51%
Source: INSEE

== See also ==
- Communes of the Vienne department
