= Vouzailles =

- Commune
- Location of Vouzailles
- Location within France Location within Nouvelle-Aquitaine
- Coordinates: 46°42′33″N 0°05′41″E
- Country: France
- Region: Nouvelle-Aquitaine
- Department: Vienne
- Arrondissement: Poitiers
- Canton: Migné-Auxances
- Intercommunality: Haut-Poitou

Government
  - Mayor (2020–2026): Roland Dudognon
- Area^{1}: 15.77 km^{2} (6.09 sq mi)
- Elevation: 152 m (499 ft)
- Highest elevation: 154 m (505 ft)
- Lowest elevation: 111 m (364 ft)
- Population (2023): 566
  - Density: 35.9/km^{2} (93.0/sq mi)
- Time zone: UTC+01:00 (CET)
  - Summer (DST): UTC+02:00 (CEST)
- INSEE/Postal code: 86299 /86170
- ^{1} French Land Register data, which excludes lakes, ponds, glaciers > 1 km^{2} (0.386 sq mi or 247 acres) and river estuaries.

Vouzailles (French pronunciation: [vuzaj]) is a commune in the Vienne department in the Nouvelle-Aquitaine region in western France.

== See also ==
- Communes of the Vienne department
