= Vernon, Vienne =

Vernon
- Commune
- Location of Vernon
- Location within France Location within Nouvelle-Aquitaine
- Coordinates: 46°26′28″N 0°28′38″E
- Country: France
- Region: Nouvelle-Aquitaine
- Department: Vienne
- Arrondissement: Poitiers
- Canton: Vivonne
- Intercommunality: Vallées du Clain

Government
  - Mayor (2020–2026): Bertrand Herault
- Area^{1}: 38.38 km^{2} (14.82 sq mi)
- Elevation: 128 m (420 ft)
- Highest elevation: 139 m (456 ft)
- Lowest elevation: 113 m (371 ft)
- Population (2023): 730
  - Density: 19/km^{2} (49/sq mi)
- Time zone: UTC+01:00 (CET)
  - Summer (DST): UTC+02:00 (CEST)
- INSEE/Postal code: 86284 /86340
- ^{1} French Land Register data, which excludes lakes, ponds, glaciers > 1 km^{2} (0.386 sq mi or 247 acres) and river estuaries.

Vernon (French pronunciation: [vɛʁnɔ̃]) is a commune in the Vienne department in the Nouvelle-Aquitaine region in western France.

== See also ==
- Communes of the Vienne department
