= Smarves =

- Commune
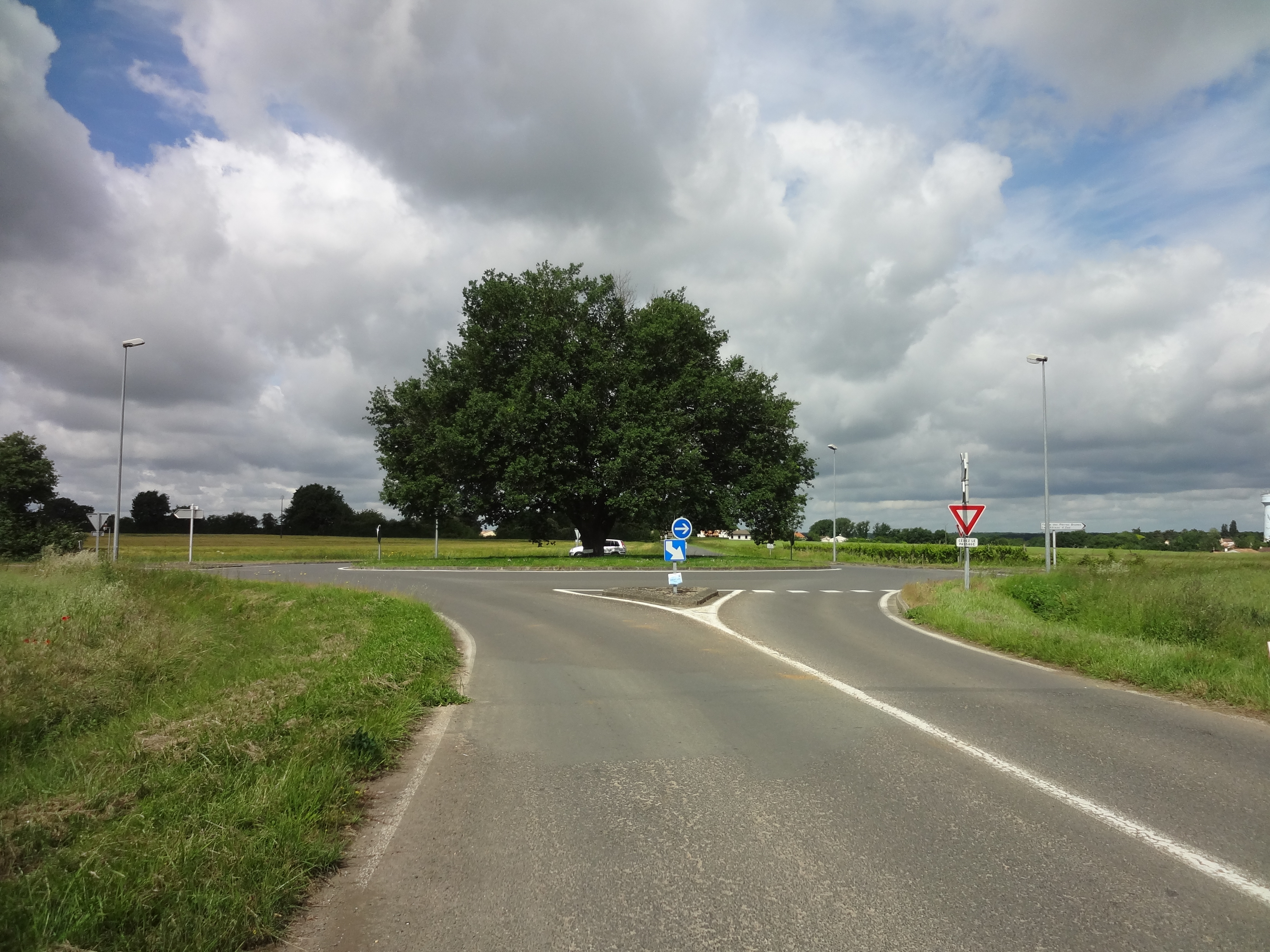
- A roundabout containing a centuries-old oak, in Smarves
- Location of Smarves
- Location within France Location within Nouvelle-Aquitaine
- Coordinates: 46°30′40″N 0°21′01″E
- Country: France
- Region: Nouvelle-Aquitaine
- Department: Vienne
- Arrondissement: Poitiers
- Canton: Vivonne

Government
  - Mayor (2022–2026): Michel Godet
- Area^{1}: 20.09 km^{2} (7.76 sq mi)
- Elevation: 115 m (377 ft)
- Highest elevation: 141 m (463 ft)
- Lowest elevation: 72 m (236 ft)
- Population (2023): 2,941
  - Density: 146.4/km^{2} (379.2/sq mi)
- Time zone: UTC+01:00 (CET)
  - Summer (DST): UTC+02:00 (CEST)
- INSEE/Postal code: 86263 /86240
- ^{1} French Land Register data, which excludes lakes, ponds, glaciers > 1 km^{2} (0.386 sq mi or 247 acres) and river estuaries.

Smarves (French pronunciation: [smaʁv]) is a commune in the Vienne department in the Nouvelle-Aquitaine region in western France.

== Population ==
Historical population
Year	Pop.	±% p.a.
1968	1,126	—
1975	1,490	+4.08%
1982	2,069	+4.80%
1990	2,089	+0.12%
1999	2,156	+0.35%
2007	2,406	+1.38%
2012	2,618	+1.70%
2017	2,810	+1.43%
2023	2,941	+0.76%
Source: INSEE

== See also ==
- Communes of the Vienne department
