= Villiers, Vienne =

Villiers
- Commune
- Location of Villiers
- Location within France Location within Nouvelle-Aquitaine
- Coordinates: 46°40′33″N 0°10′29″E
- Country: France
- Region: Nouvelle-Aquitaine
- Department: Vienne
- Arrondissement: Poitiers
- Canton: Migné-Auxances

Government
  - Mayor (2020–2026): Joël Doret
- Area^{1}: 10.87 km^{2} (4.20 sq mi)
- Elevation: 135 m (443 ft)
- Highest elevation: 150 m (490 ft)
- Lowest elevation: 118 m (387 ft)
- Population (2023): 982
  - Density: 90.3/km^{2} (234/sq mi)
- Time zone: UTC+01:00 (CET)
  - Summer (DST): UTC+02:00 (CEST)
- INSEE/Postal code: 86292 /86190
- ^{1} French Land Register data, which excludes lakes, ponds, glaciers > 1 km^{2} (0.386 sq mi or 247 acres) and river estuaries.

Villiers (French pronunciation: [vilje]) is a commune in the Vienne department in the Nouvelle-Aquitaine region in western France.

== See also ==
- Communes of the Vienne department
