= Cloué =

- Commune
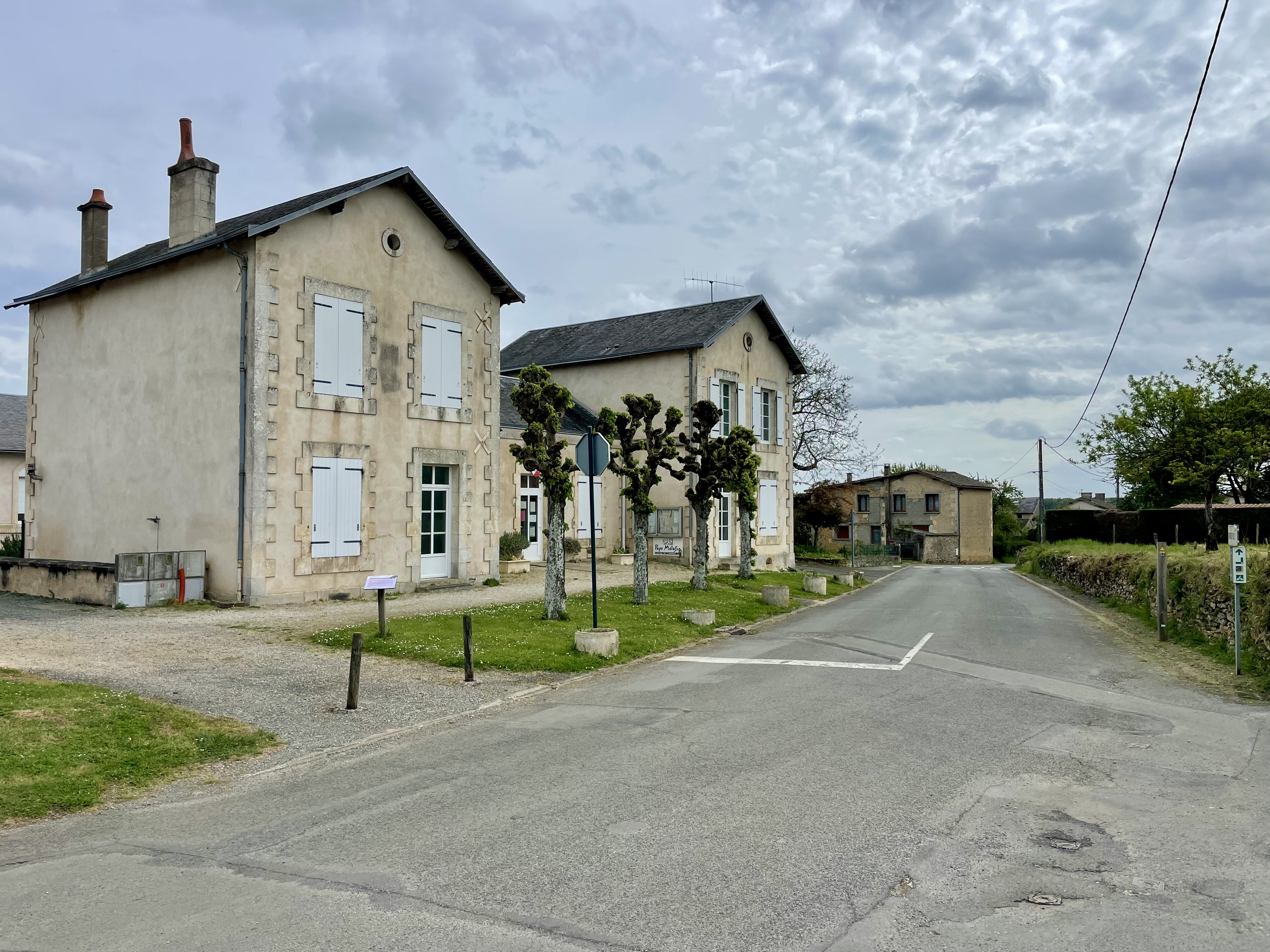
- Cloué Town hall
- Location of Cloué
- Location within France Location within Nouvelle-Aquitaine
- Coordinates: 46°26′35″N 0°09′56″E
- Country: France
- Region: Nouvelle-Aquitaine
- Department: Vienne
- Arrondissement: Poitiers
- Canton: Lusignan
- Intercommunality: CU Grand Poitiers

Government
  - Mayor (2020–2026): Frédy Poirier
- Area^{1}: 12.21 km^{2} (4.71 sq mi)
- Highest elevation: 147 m (482 ft)
- Lowest elevation: 95 m (312 ft)
- Population (2023): 490
  - Density: 40/km^{2} (100/sq mi)
- Time zone: UTC+01:00 (CET)
  - Summer (DST): UTC+02:00 (CEST)
- INSEE/Postal code: 86080 /86600
- ^{1} French Land Register data, which excludes lakes, ponds, glaciers > 1 km^{2} (0.386 sq mi or 247 acres) and river estuaries.

Cloué (French pronunciation: [klue]) is a commune in the Vienne department in the Nouvelle-Aquitaine region in western France.

== See also ==
- Communes of the Vienne department
