= Château de Chambonneau =

Castle in Nouvelle-Aquitaine, France

Coordinates: 46°27′24″N 0°26′18″E

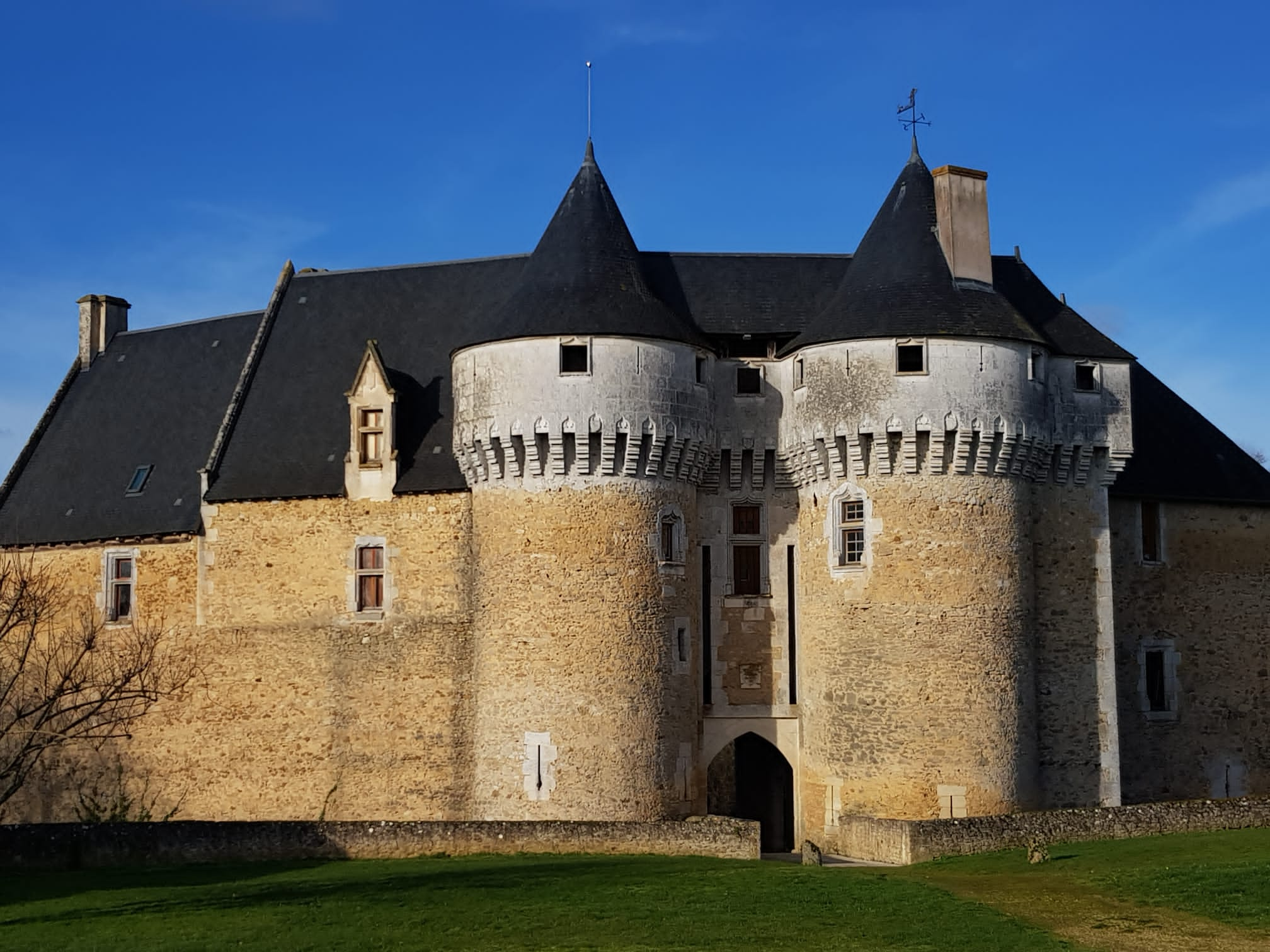

The Château de Chambonneau is a castle in the commune of Gizay in the Vienne department of France that still shows good parts of the original "chateau fort". It is built down a hill, close to the Miosson (a tributary of the Clain river). The original castle dates from the time of Philippe VI, the beginning of the 14th century. The present château dates between 1335 and 1609. The remaining original parts represent the keep and 75% of the towers and lower buildings.

== History ==
The former manor (built aside from the present-day château) lasted until the 14th century. It belonged to the abbey of Ligugé, which sold it in the 11th century to the Anguittard family. At this time, only a feudal motte existed, on the summit of the hill. There are two theories to explain the origin of the castle's name:

- generally, place names with Chambon or Chambonneau come from the stem Xambo, that is to say, 'bend in a river'. This name is often reinterpreted as meaning champ bon (good field) and it has thus been understood for a long time as signifying the alluvial soil.
- in this particular case, other sources conserved in private archives would indicate an old name of camboniac or campus bonac - good camp (in modern French: camp bon) - indicating that it protected the surroundings against enemies.

At the start of the 14th century, new owners, the Frottiers de Chambonneau, constructed an imposing castle designed to reflect developments in artillery. Instead of building on the site of the former stronghold, as was usually done, they decided to build the new castle at the foot of the hill so as to profit from the proximity of the river to construct moats.

The castle was built to a quadrangular plan, with round towers at the corners, two other towers (rounded on the exterior only) in the middle of the longer sides, and two more towers to defend the gate. The gate was protected by a châtelet. All of the towers were approximately 17 metres (56 ft) high, the square keep 26 metres (85 ft).

In 1356, after the capture of Jean II de France (Jean le bon) during the Battle of Poitiers, the English were looking for shelter for the night, to avoid a surprise attack. They presented themselves that evening at Chambonneau, with Jean le Bon in front, demanding shelter for the night. The lord trustingly opened up, and thus lost his castle in one minute. It was, then, in this castle that Jean le Bon spent his first meal in captivity (maybe also the night?).

== Transformation into a residence ==
Under Louis XI, calmer times allowed work to make the castle more comfortable. The curtain wall and towers were demolished on the west side, the keep and gatehouse towers lowered in height, and accommodation buildings constructed symmetrically on either side of the gatehouse.

In the 16th century, by royal edict the manor was the first to be auctioned in Poitou. Its owner was effectively in debt through gambling. The new owner built between 1605 and 1609 two farms in an L-shape in front of the castle and, in the corners, two pigeon lofts containing 4000 pigeon holes. The southern loft still has its spiral staircase dating from the time of Henri IV. Also added at this time were a chapel (1578) and new accommodation extending the earlier building to the south.

Under the First Empire (1810), the castle was bought by Monsieur de La Chaslerie, maternal ancestor of the count of Beaucorps-Créquy (Créquy family). The two gatehouse towers, already greatly reduced in height, were completely removed in 1953, in order to allow access for the owner's wife's car.

The Château de Chambonneau has been listed since 1964 as a monument historique by the French Ministry of Culture.

== See also ==
- List of castles in France
