= Nouaillé-Maupertuis =

- Commune
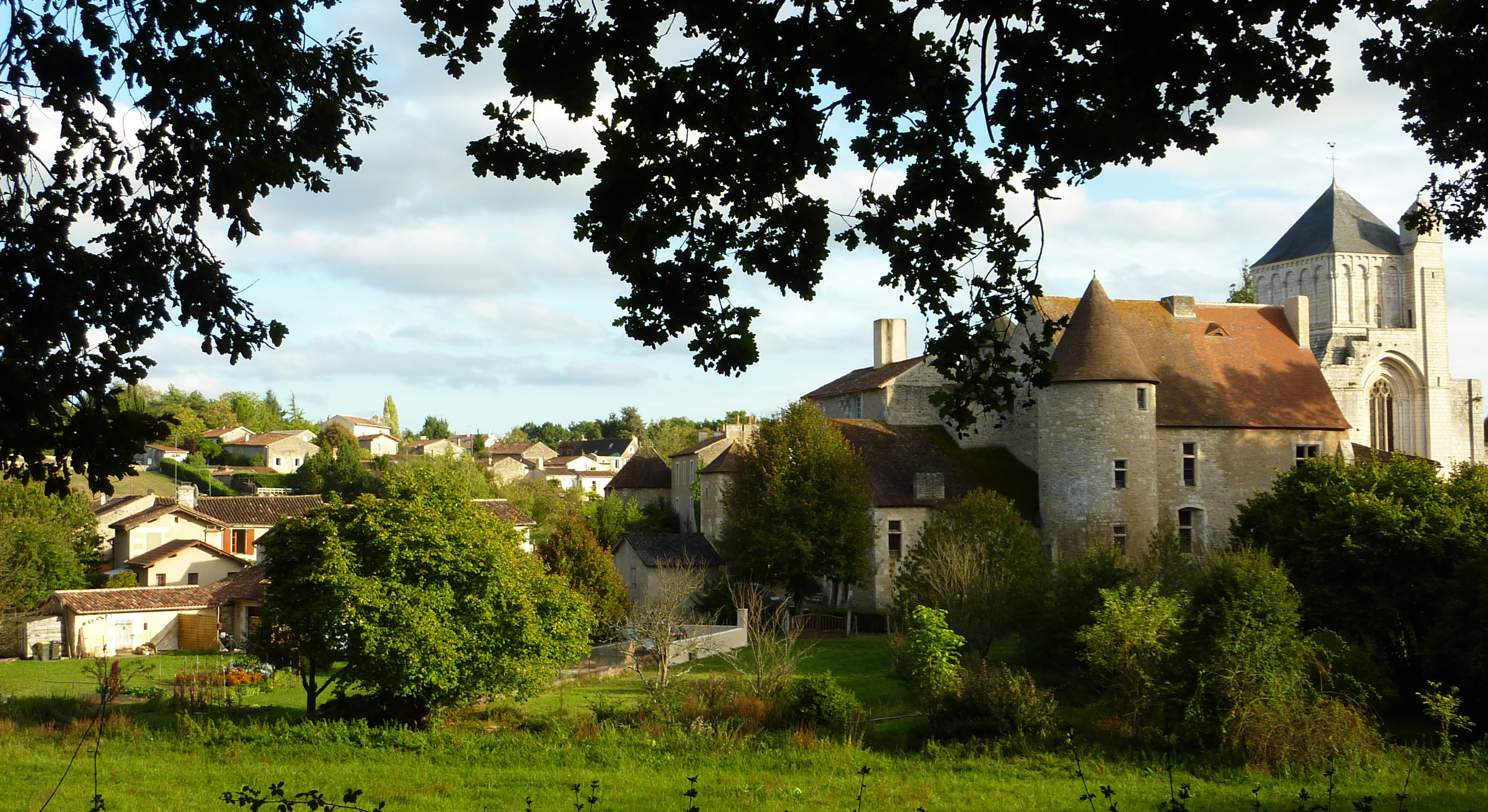
- The village and the abbey of Nouaillé-Maupertuis

- Coat of arms
- Location of Nouaillé-Maupertuis
- Location within France Location within Nouvelle-Aquitaine
- Coordinates: 46°30′34″N 0°24′54″E
- Country: France
- Region: Nouvelle-Aquitaine
- Department: Vienne
- Arrondissement: Poitiers
- Canton: Vivonne

Government
  - Mayor (2020–2026): Michel Bugnet
- Area^{1}: 22.13 km^{2} (8.54 sq mi)
- Highest elevation: 139 m (456 ft)
- Lowest elevation: 93 m (305 ft)
- Population (2023): 2,975
  - Density: 134.4/km^{2} (348.2/sq mi)
- Time zone: UTC+01:00 (CET)
  - Summer (DST): UTC+02:00 (CEST)
- INSEE/Postal code: 86180 /86340
- ^{1} French Land Register data, which excludes lakes, ponds, glaciers > 1 km^{2} (0.386 sq mi or 247 acres) and river estuaries.

Nouaillé-Maupertuis (French pronunciation: [nwaje mopɛʁtɥi]) is a commune in the Vienne department in the Nouvelle-Aquitaine region in western France.

The English victory in the 1356 Battle of Poitiers was won (46.53°N 0.4°E) within the bounds of this modern commune a few kilometres southeast of Poitiers.

== Population ==
Historical population
Year	Pop.	±% p.a.
1968	796	—
1975	1,017	+3.56%
1982	1,433	+5.02%
1990	2,142	+5.15%
1999	2,404	+1.29%
2007	2,731	+1.61%
2012	2,754	+0.17%
2017	2,751	−0.02%
2023	2,975	+1.31%
Source: INSEE

== See also ==
- Communes of the Vienne department
