= Canton of Migné-Auxances =

Coordinates: 46.62°N 0.31°E

The canton of Migné-Auxances is an administrative division of the Vienne department, western France. It was created at the French canton reorganisation which came into effect in March 2015. Its seat is in Migné-Auxances.

It consists of the following communes:

1. Amberre
2. Avanton
3. Champigny en Rochereau
4. Cherves
5. Cissé
6. Cuhon
7. Maisonneuve
8. Massognes
9. Migné-Auxances
10. Mirebeau
11. Neuville-de-Poitou
12. Thurageau
13. Villiers
14. Vouzailles
15. Yversay
