= Canton of Poitiers-4 =

Coordinates: 46.57°N 0.36°E

The canton of Poitiers-4 is an administrative division of the Vienne department, western France. Its borders were modified at the French canton reorganisation which came into effect in March 2015. Its seat is in Poitiers.

It consists of the following communes:

1. Mignaloux-Beauvoir
2. Poitiers (partly)
