= Fleuré, Vienne =

Fleuré
- Commune
- Location of Fleuré
- Location within France Location within Nouvelle-Aquitaine
- Coordinates: 46°28′42″N 0°31′22″E
- Country: France
- Region: Nouvelle-Aquitaine
- Department: Vienne
- Arrondissement: Poitiers
- Canton: Vivonne

Government
  - Mayor (2020–2026): Vivian Perroches
- Area^{1}: 16.68 km^{2} (6.44 sq mi)
- Elevation: 138 m (453 ft)
- Highest elevation: 136 m (446 ft)
- Lowest elevation: 98 m (322 ft)
- Population (2023): 1,137
  - Density: 68.17/km^{2} (176.5/sq mi)
- Time zone: UTC+01:00 (CET)
  - Summer (DST): UTC+02:00 (CEST)
- INSEE/Postal code: 86099 /86340
- ^{1} French Land Register data, which excludes lakes, ponds, glaciers > 1 km^{2} (0.386 sq mi or 247 acres) and river estuaries.

Fleuré (French pronunciation: [flœʁe]) is a commune in the Vienne department in the Nouvelle-Aquitaine region in western France.

== Geography ==
=== Localisation ===
Commune of 1,000 inhabitants located 18 km southeast of Poitiers.

== See also ==
- Communes of the Vienne department
