= Saint-Sauvant, Vienne =

Saint-Sauvant
- Commune
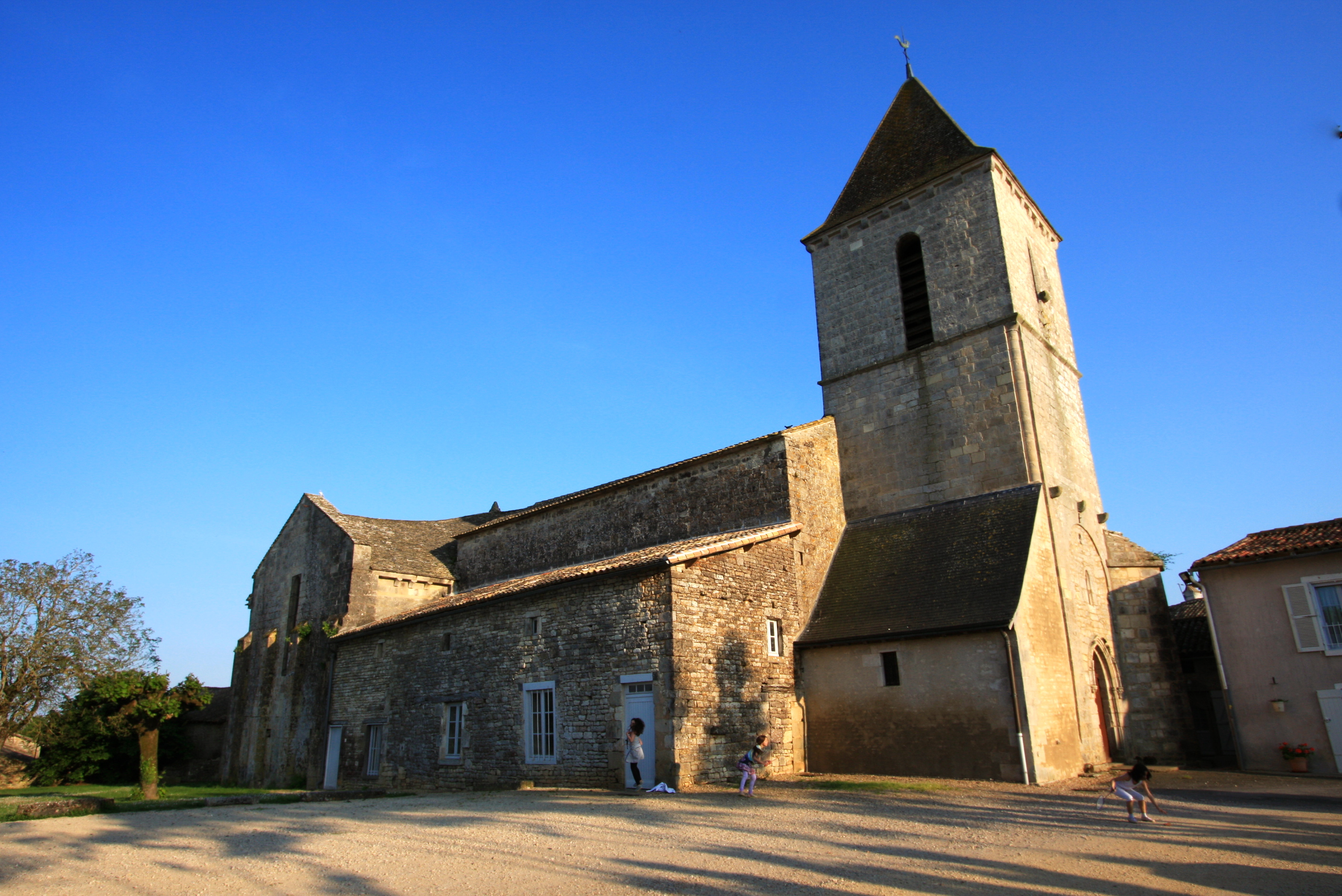
- The church in Saint-Sauvant
- Location of Saint-Sauvant
- Location within France Location within Nouvelle-Aquitaine
- Coordinates: 46°21′37″N 0°03′25″E
- Country: France
- Region: Nouvelle-Aquitaine
- Department: Vienne
- Arrondissement: Poitiers
- Canton: Lusignan
- Intercommunality: CU Grand Poitiers

Government
  - Mayor (2020–2026): Christophe Chappet
- Area^{1}: 59.58 km^{2} (23.00 sq mi)
- Highest elevation: 159 m (522 ft)
- Lowest elevation: 122 m (400 ft)
- Population (2023): 1,293
  - Density: 21.70/km^{2} (56.21/sq mi)
- Time zone: UTC+01:00 (CET)
  - Summer (DST): UTC+02:00 (CEST)
- INSEE/Postal code: 86244 /86600
- ^{1} French Land Register data, which excludes lakes, ponds, glaciers > 1 km^{2} (0.386 sq mi or 247 acres) and river estuaries.

Saint-Sauvant (French pronunciation: [sɛ̃ sovɑ̃]) is a commune in the Vienne department in the Nouvelle-Aquitaine region in western France.

== See also ==
- Communes of the Vienne department
