= Canton of Lusignan =

Coordinates: 46.43°N 0.12°E

The canton of Lusignan is an administrative division of the Vienne department, western France. Its borders were modified at the French canton reorganisation which came into effect in March 2015. Its seat is in Lusignan.

It consists of the following communes:

1. Anché
2. Brux
3. Celle-Lévescault
4. Chaunay
5. Cloué
6. Coulombiers
7. Curzay-sur-Vonne
8. Jazeneuil
9. Lusignan
10. Romagne
11. Rouillé
12. Saint-Sauvant
13. Sanxay
14. Valence-en-Poitou
15. Voulon
