= Canton of Vivonne =

Coordinates: 46.43°N 0.26°E

The canton of Vivonne is an administrative division of the Vienne department, western France. Its borders were modified at the French canton reorganisation which came into effect in March 2015. Its seat is in Vivonne.

It consists of the following communes:

1. Aslonnes
2. Château-Larcher
3. Dienné
4. Fleuré
5. Gizay
6. Iteuil
7. Marçay
8. Marigny-Chemereau
9. Marnay
10. Nieuil-l'Espoir
11. Nouaillé-Maupertuis
12. Roches-Prémarie-Andillé
13. Smarves
14. Vernon
15. La Villedieu-du-Clain
16. Vivonne
