= Arçay =

Arçay may refer to the following places in France:

- Arçay, Cher, a commune in the department of Cher
- Arçay, Vienne, a commune in the department of Vienne
