= Leugny =

Leugny may refer to the following places in France:

- Leugny, Vienne, a commune in the Vienne department
- Leugny, Yonne, a commune in the Yonne department
