= Leigné-sur-Usseau =

- Commune
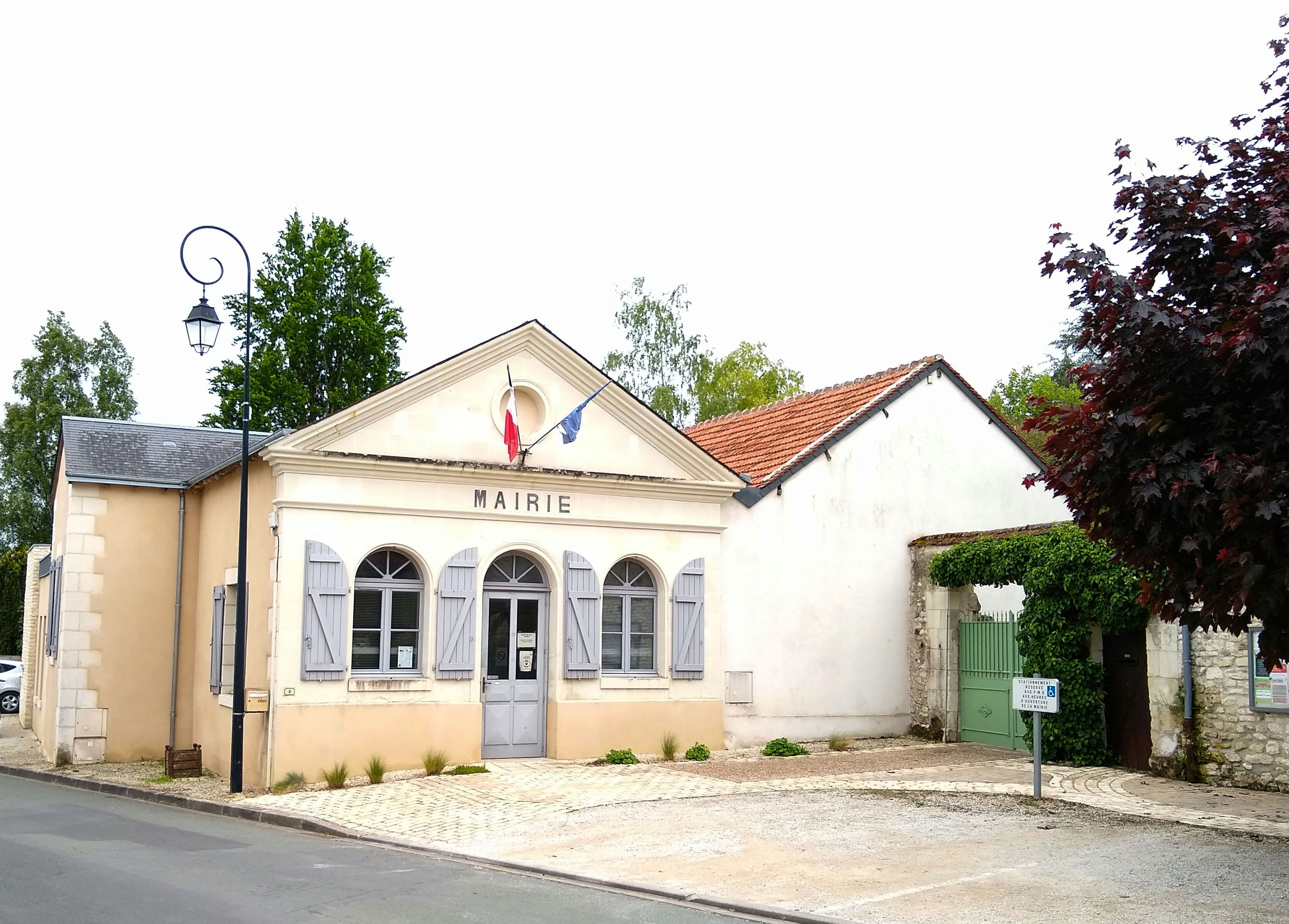
- Leigné-sur-Usseau Town hall

- Coat of arms
- Location of Leigné-sur-Usseau
- Location within France Location within Nouvelle-Aquitaine
- Coordinates: 46°54′50″N 0°28′22″E
- Country: France
- Region: Nouvelle-Aquitaine
- Department: Vienne
- Arrondissement: Châtellerault
- Canton: Châtellerault-2
- Intercommunality: CA Grand Châtellerault

Government
  - Mayor (2020–2026): Frédéric Merchadou
- Area^{1}: 11.23 km^{2} (4.34 sq mi)
- Elevation: 104 m (341 ft)
- Highest elevation: 162 m (531 ft)
- Lowest elevation: 92 m (302 ft)
- Population (2023): 451
  - Density: 40.2/km^{2} (104/sq mi)
- Time zone: UTC+01:00 (CET)
  - Summer (DST): UTC+02:00 (CEST)
- INSEE/Postal code: 86127 /86230
- ^{1} French Land Register data, which excludes lakes, ponds, glaciers > 1 km^{2} (0.386 sq mi or 247 acres) and river estuaries.

Leigné-sur-Usseau (French pronunciation: [lɛɲe syʁ yso], literally Leigné on Usseau) is a commune in the Vienne department in the Nouvelle-Aquitaine region in western France.

== Demographics ==
Historical population
Year	Pop.	±% p.a.
1968	327	—
1975	318	−0.40%
1982	329	+0.49%
1990	384	+1.95%
1999	413	+0.81%
2007	454	+1.19%
2012	482	+1.20%
2017	475	−0.29%
2023	451	−0.86%
Source: INSEE

== See also ==
- Communes of the Vienne department
