= Communes of the Vienne department =

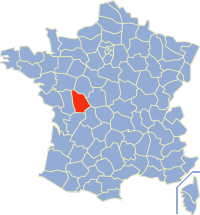

The following is a list of the 265 communes of the Vienne department of France.

The communes cooperate in the following intercommunalities (as of 2025):

- Communauté urbaine Grand Poitiers
- Communauté d'agglomération Grand Châtellerault
- Communauté de communes du Civraisien en Poitou
- Communauté de communes du Haut-Poitou
- Communauté de communes du Pays Loudunais
- Communauté de communes des Vallées du Clain
- Communauté de communes Vienne et Gartempe

| INSEE code | Postal code | Commune |
|---|---|---|
| 86001 | 86430 | Adriers |
| 86002 | 86110 | Amberre |
| 86003 | 86700 | Anché |
| 86004 | 86260 | Angles-sur-l'Anglin |
| 86005 | 86330 | Angliers |
| 86006 | 86310 | Antigny |
| 86007 | 86100 | Antran |
| 86008 | 86200 | Arçay |
| 86009 | 86210 | Archigny |
| 86010 | 86340 | Aslonnes |
| 86011 | 86430 | Asnières-sur-Blour |
| 86012 | 86250 | Asnois |
| 86013 | 86330 | Aulnay |
| 86014 | 86530 | Availles-en-Châtellerault |
| 86015 | 86460 | Availles-Limouzine |
| 86016 | 86170 | Avanton |
| 86017 | 86190 | Ayron |
| 86018 | 86200 | Basses |
| 86019 | 86490 | Beaumont Saint-Cyr |
| 86020 | 86210 | Bellefonds |
| 86022 | 86120 | Berrie |
| 86023 | 86420 | Berthegon |
| 86024 | 86190 | Béruges |
| 86025 | 86310 | Béthines |
| 86026 | 86120 | Beuxes |
| 86027 | 86580 | Biard |
| 86028 | 86800 | Bignoux |
| 86029 | 86400 | Blanzay |
| 86123 | 86470 | Boivre-la-Vallée |
| 86031 | 86300 | Bonnes |
| 86032 | 86210 | Bonneuil-Matours |
| 86034 | 86410 | Bouresse |
| 86035 | 86390 | Bourg-Archambault |
| 86036 | 86120 | Bournand |
| 86037 | 86290 | Brigueil-le-Chantre |
| 86038 | 86160 | Brion |
| 86039 | 86510 | Brux |
| 86040 | 86310 | La Bussière |
| 86041 | 86180 | Buxerolles |
| 86042 | 37160 | Buxeuil |
| 86044 | 86200 | Ceaux-en-Loudun |
| 86045 | 86600 | Celle-Lévescault |
| 86046 | 86530 | Cenon-sur-Vienne |
| 86047 | 86140 | Cernay |
| 86048 | 86380 | Chabournay |
| 86049 | 86200 | Chalais |
| 86050 | 86190 | Chalandray |
| 86051 | 86510 | Champagné-le-Sec |
| 86052 | 86160 | Champagné-Saint-Hilaire |
| 86053 | 86170 | Champigny en Rochereau |
| 86054 | 86400 | Champniers |
| 86055 | 86250 | La Chapelle-Bâton |
| 86058 | 86210 | La Chapelle-Moulière |
| 86059 | 86300 | Chapelle-Viviers |
| 86061 | 86250 | Charroux |
| 86062 | 86360 | Chasseneuil-du-Poitou |
| 86063 | 86250 | Chatain |
| 86064 | 86350 | Château-Garnier |
| 86065 | 86370 | Château-Larcher |
| 86066 | 86100 | Châtellerault |
| 86068 | 86510 | Chaunay |
| 86069 | 86330 | La Chaussée |
| 86070 | 86300 | Chauvigny |
| 86072 | 86450 | Chenevelles |
| 86073 | 86170 | Cherves |
| 86074 | 86190 | Chiré-en-Montreuil |
| 86075 | 86110 | Chouppes |
| 86076 | 86170 | Cissé |
| 86077 | 86320 | Civaux |
| 86078 | 86400 | Civray |
| 86080 | 86600 | Cloué |
| 86081 | 86490 | Colombiers |
| 86083 | 86600 | Coulombiers |
| 86084 | 86290 | Coulonges |
| 86085 | 86110 | Coussay |
| 86086 | 86270 | Coussay-les-Bois |
| 86087 | 86110 | Craon |
| 86088 | 86240 | Croutelle |
| 86089 | 86110 | Cuhon |
| 86090 | 86120 | Curçay-sur-Dive |
| 86091 | 86600 | Curzay-sur-Vonne |
| 86092 | 86220 | Dangé-Saint-Romain |
| 86093 | 86420 | Dercé |
| 86094 | 86410 | Dienné |
| 86095 | 86130 | Dissay |
| 86096 | 86140 | Doussay |
| 86097 | 86160 | La Ferrière-Airoux |
| 86098 | 86300 | Fleix |
| 86099 | 86340 | Fleuré |
| 86100 | 86240 | Fontaine-le-Comte |
| 86102 | 86190 | Frozes |
| 86103 | 86160 | Gençay |
| 86104 | 86250 | Genouillé |
| 86105 | 86340 | Gizay |
| 86106 | 86200 | Glénouze |
| 86107 | 86320 | Gouex |
| 86108 | 86330 | La Grimaudière |
| 86109 | 86420 | Guesnes |
| 86110 | 86310 | Haims |
| 86111 | 86220 | Ingrandes |
| 86112 | 86150 | L'Isle-Jourdain |
| 86113 | 86240 | Iteuil |
| 86114 | 86800 | Jardres |
| 86115 | 86130 | Jaunay-Marigny |
| 86116 | 86600 | Jazeneuil |
| 86117 | 86500 | Jouhet |
| 86118 | 86290 | Journet |
| 86119 | 86350 | Joussé |
| 86120 | 86390 | Lathus-Saint-Rémy |
| 86121 | 86190 | Latillé |
| 86122 | 86300 | Lauthiers |
| 86124 | 86800 | Lavoux |
| 86125 | 86450 | Leigné-les-Bois |
| 86126 | 86300 | Leignes-sur-Fontaine |
| 86127 | 86230 | Leigné-sur-Usseau |
| 86128 | 86140 | Lencloître |
| 86129 | 86270 | Lésigny |
| 86130 | 86220 | Leugny |
| 86131 | 86410 | Lhommaizé |
| 86132 | 86290 | Liglet |
| 86133 | 86240 | Ligugé |
| 86134 | 86400 | Linazay |
| 86135 | 86800 | Liniers |
| 86136 | 86400 | Lizant |
| 86137 | 86200 | Loudun |
| 86138 | 86430 | Luchapt |
| 86139 | 86600 | Lusignan |
| 86140 | 86320 | Lussac-les-Châteaux |
| 86141 | 86160 | Magné |
| 86142 | 86190 | Maillé |
| 86143 | 86270 | Mairé |
| 86144 | 86170 | Maisonneuve |
| 86145 | 86370 | Marçay |

| INSEE code | Postal code | Commune |
|---|---|---|
| 86147 | 86370 | Marigny-Chemereau |
| 86148 | 86160 | Marnay |
| 86149 | 86330 | Martaizé |
| 86150 | 86170 | Massognes |
| 86151 | 86200 | Maulay |
| 86152 | 86460 | Mauprévoir |
| 86153 | 86320 | Mazerolles |
| 86154 | 86110 | Mazeuil |
| 86156 | 86200 | Messemé |
| 86157 | 86550 | Mignaloux-Beauvoir |
| 86158 | 86440 | Migné-Auxances |
| 86159 | 86150 | Millac |
| 86160 | 86110 | Mirebeau |
| 86161 | 86330 | Moncontour |
| 86162 | 86230 | Mondion |
| 86163 | 86360 | Montamisé |
| 86164 | 86210 | Monthoiron |
| 86165 | 86500 | Montmorillon |
| 86167 | 86420 | Monts-sur-Guesnes |
| 86169 | 86120 | Morton |
| 86170 | 86500 | Moulismes |
| 86171 | 86150 | Moussac |
| 86173 | 86200 | Mouterre-Silly |
| 86172 | 86430 | Mouterre-sur-Blourde |
| 86174 | 86530 | Naintré |
| 86175 | 86310 | Nalliers |
| 86176 | 86150 | Nérignac |
| 86177 | 86170 | Neuville-de-Poitou |
| 86178 | 86340 | Nieuil-l'Espoir |
| 86180 | 86340 | Nouaillé-Maupertuis |
| 86181 | 86200 | Nueil-sous-Faye |
| 86182 | 86230 | Orches |
| 86183 | 86220 | Les Ormes |
| 86184 | 86380 | Ouzilly |
| 86186 | 86220 | Oyré |
| 86187 | 86300 | Paizay-le-Sec |
| 86189 | 86350 | Payroux |
| 86190 | 86320 | Persac |
| 86191 | 86500 | Pindray |
| 86192 | 86500 | Plaisance |
| 86193 | 86450 | Pleumartin |
| 86194 | 86000 | Poitiers |
| 86195 | 86220 | Port-de-Piles |
| 86196 | 86120 | Pouançay |
| 86197 | 86200 | Pouant |
| 86198 | 86800 | Pouillé |
| 86200 | 86460 | Pressac |
| 86201 | 86420 | Prinçay |
| 86202 | 86260 | La Puye |
| 86203 | 86150 | Queaux |
| 86204 | 86190 | Quinçay |
| 86205 | 86200 | Ranton |
| 86206 | 86120 | Raslay |
| 86207 | 86270 | La Roche-Posay |
| 86079 | 86200 | La Roche-Rigault |
| 86209 | 86340 | Roches-Prémarie-Andillé |
| 86210 | 86120 | Roiffé |
| 86211 | 86700 | Romagne |
| 86213 | 86480 | Rouillé |
| 86214 | 86280 | Saint-Benoît |
| 86217 | 86230 | Saint-Christophe |
| 86218 | 86330 | Saint-Clair |
| 86239 | 86300 | Sainte-Radégonde |
| 86220 | 86400 | Saint-Gaudent |
| 86221 | 86140 | Saint-Genest-d'Ambière |
| 86222 | 86130 | Saint-Georges-lès-Baillargeaux |
| 86223 | 86310 | Saint-Germain |
| 86224 | 86230 | Saint-Gervais-les-Trois-Clochers |
| 86225 | 86330 | Saint-Jean-de-Sauves |
| 86226 | 86800 | Saint-Julien-l'Ars |
| 86227 | 86200 | Saint-Laon |
| 86228 | 86410 | Saint-Laurent-de-Jourdes |
| 86229 | 86120 | Saint-Léger-de-Montbrillais |
| 86230 | 86290 | Saint-Léomer |
| 86281 | 86380 | Saint-Martin-la-Pallu |
| 86234 | 86350 | Saint-Martin-l'Ars |
| 86235 | 86160 | Saint-Maurice-la-Clouère |
| 86236 | 86260 | Saint-Pierre-de-Maillé |
| 86237 | 86400 | Saint-Pierre-d'Exideuil |
| 86241 | 86220 | Saint-Rémy-sur-Creuse |
| 86242 | 86250 | Saint-Romain |
| 86244 | 86600 | Saint-Sauvant |
| 86246 | 86310 | Saint-Savin |
| 86248 | 86350 | Saint-Secondin |
| 86249 | 86420 | Saires |
| 86250 | 86120 | Saix |
| 86252 | 86200 | Sammarçolles |
| 86253 | 86600 | Sanxay |
| 86254 | 86500 | Saulgé |
| 86255 | 86400 | Savigné |
| 86256 | 86800 | Savigny-Lévescault |
| 86257 | 86140 | Savigny-sous-Faye |
| 86258 | 86140 | Scorbé-Clairvaux |
| 86245 | 86100 | Senillé-Saint-Sauveur |
| 86260 | 86230 | Sérigny |
| 86261 | 86800 | Sèvres-Anxaumont |
| 86262 | 86320 | Sillars |
| 86263 | 86240 | Smarves |
| 86264 | 86160 | Sommières-du-Clain |
| 86265 | 86230 | Sossais |
| 86266 | 86250 | Surin |
| 86268 | 86800 | Tercé |
| 86269 | 86120 | Ternay |
| 86270 | 86290 | Thollet |
| 86271 | 86110 | Thurageau |
| 86272 | 86540 | Thuré |
| 86273 | 86290 | La Trimouille |
| 86274 | 86120 | Les Trois-Moutiers |
| 86275 | 86230 | Usseau |
| 86276 | 86350 | Usson-du-Poitou |
| 86247 | 86400 | Val-de-Comporté |
| 86233 | 86300 | Valdivienne |
| 86082 | 86700 | Valence-en-Poitou |
| 86279 | 86220 | Vaux-sur-Vienne |
| 86280 | 86230 | Vellèches |
| 86284 | 86340 | Vernon |
| 86285 | 86410 | Verrières |
| 86286 | 86420 | Verrue |
| 86287 | 86120 | Vézières |
| 86288 | 86260 | Vicq-sur-Gartempe |
| 86289 | 86150 | Le Vigeant |
| 86290 | 86340 | La Villedieu-du-Clain |
| 86291 | 86310 | Villemort |
| 86292 | 86190 | Villiers |
| 86293 | 86370 | Vivonne |
| 86294 | 86190 | Vouillé |
| 86295 | 86400 | Voulême |
| 86296 | 86700 | Voulon |
| 86297 | 86580 | Vouneuil-sous-Biard |
| 86298 | 86210 | Vouneuil-sur-Vienne |
| 86299 | 86170 | Vouzailles |
| 86300 | 86170 | Yversay |
