= Pouançay =

- Commune
- Location of Pouançay
- Location within France Location within Nouvelle-Aquitaine
- Coordinates: 47°04′51″N 0°04′20″W
- Country: France
- Region: Nouvelle-Aquitaine
- Department: Vienne
- Arrondissement: Châtellerault
- Canton: Loudun
- Intercommunality: Pays Loudunais

Government
  - Mayor (2020–2026): Pierre Chauvin
- Area^{1}: 5.46 km^{2} (2.11 sq mi)
- Elevation: 54 m (177 ft)
- Highest elevation: 102 m (335 ft)
- Lowest elevation: 35 m (115 ft)
- Population (2023): 230
  - Density: 42/km^{2} (110/sq mi)
- Time zone: UTC+01:00 (CET)
  - Summer (DST): UTC+02:00 (CEST)
- INSEE/Postal code: 86196 /86120
- ^{1} French Land Register data, which excludes lakes, ponds, glaciers > 1 km^{2} (0.386 sq mi or 247 acres) and river estuaries.

Pouançay (French pronunciation: [pwɑ̃sɛ]) is a commune in the Vienne department in the Nouvelle-Aquitaine region in western France.

== Demographics ==
Historical population
Year	Pop.	±% p.a.
1968	144	—
1975	180	+3.24%
1982	231	+3.63%
1990	285	+2.66%
1999	275	−0.40%
2007	240	−1.69%
2012	240	+0.00%
2017	234	−0.51%
2023	230	−0.29%
Source: INSEE

== See also ==
- Communes of the Vienne department
