= Saint-Clair, Vienne =

Saint-Clair
- Commune
- Location of Saint-Clair
- Location within France Location within Nouvelle-Aquitaine
- Coordinates: 46°52′54″N 0°03′50″E
- Country: France
- Region: Nouvelle-Aquitaine
- Department: Vienne
- Arrondissement: Châtellerault
- Canton: Loudun
- Intercommunality: Pays Loudunais

Government
  - Mayor (2020–2026): Dominique Brunet
- Area^{1}: 10.67 km^{2} (4.12 sq mi)
- Elevation: 75 m (246 ft)
- Highest elevation: 82 m (269 ft)
- Lowest elevation: 57 m (187 ft)
- Population (2023): 209
  - Density: 19.6/km^{2} (50.7/sq mi)
- Time zone: UTC+01:00 (CET)
  - Summer (DST): UTC+02:00 (CEST)
- INSEE/Postal code: 86218 /86330
- ^{1} French Land Register data, which excludes lakes, ponds, glaciers > 1 km^{2} (0.386 sq mi or 247 acres) and river estuaries.

Saint-Clair (French pronunciation: [sɛ̃ klɛːʁ]) is a commune in the Vienne department in the Nouvelle-Aquitaine region in western France.

== Demographics ==
Historical population
Year	Pop.	±% p.a.
1968	298	—
1975	268	−1.50%
1982	238	−1.68%
1990	208	−1.67%
1999	188	−1.12%
2007	202	+0.90%
2012	201	−0.10%
2017	196	−0.50%
2023	209	+1.08%
Source: INSEE

== See also ==
- Communes of the Vienne department
