= Beuxes =

- Commune
- Coat of arms
- Location of Beuxes
- Location within France Location within Nouvelle-Aquitaine
- Coordinates: 47°05′42″N 0°10′54″E
- Country: France
- Region: Nouvelle-Aquitaine
- Department: Vienne
- Arrondissement: Châtellerault
- Canton: Loudun
- Intercommunality: Pays Loudunais

Government
  - Mayor (2020–2026): Robert Monerris
- Area^{1}: 11.19 km^{2} (4.32 sq mi)
- Elevation: 51 m (167 ft)
- Highest elevation: 68 m (223 ft)
- Lowest elevation: 36 m (118 ft)
- Population (2023): 559
  - Density: 50.0/km^{2} (129/sq mi)
- Time zone: UTC+01:00 (CET)
  - Summer (DST): UTC+02:00 (CEST)
- INSEE/Postal code: 86026 /86120
- ^{1} French Land Register data, which excludes lakes, ponds, glaciers > 1 km^{2} (0.386 sq mi or 247 acres) and river estuaries.

Beuxes (French pronunciation: [bœks]) is a commune in the Vienne department, region of Nouvelle-Aquitaine, western France.

== Demographics ==
Its inhabitants are called Beuxois in French.

Historical population
Year	Pop.	±% p.a.
1968	409	—
1975	408	−0.03%
1982	443	+1.18%
1990	420	−0.66%
1999	481	+1.52%
2007	504	+0.59%
2012	565	+2.31%
2017	553	−0.43%
2023	559	+0.18%
Source: INSEE

== See also ==
- Communes of the Vienne department
