= Roiffé =

- Commune
- Location of Roiffé
- Location within France Location within Nouvelle-Aquitaine
- Coordinates: 47°07′32″N 0°03′11″E
- Country: France
- Region: Nouvelle-Aquitaine
- Department: Vienne
- Arrondissement: Châtellerault
- Canton: Loudun
- Intercommunality: Pays Loudunais

Government
  - Mayor (2020–2026): Bruno Verdier
- Area^{1}: 24.3 km^{2} (9.4 sq mi)
- Elevation: 60 m (200 ft)
- Highest elevation: 118 m (387 ft)
- Lowest elevation: 35 m (115 ft)
- Population (2023): 747
  - Density: 30.7/km^{2} (79.6/sq mi)
- Time zone: UTC+01:00 (CET)
  - Summer (DST): UTC+02:00 (CEST)
- INSEE/Postal code: 86210 /86120
- ^{1} French Land Register data, which excludes lakes, ponds, glaciers > 1 km^{2} (0.386 sq mi or 247 acres) and river estuaries.

Roiffé (French pronunciation: [ʁwafe]) is a commune in the Vienne department in the Nouvelle-Aquitaine region in western France.

== Demographics ==
Historical population
| Year | Pop. | ±% p.a. |
|---|---|---|
| 1968 | 773 | — |
| 1975 | 475 | −6.72% |
| 1982 | 535 | +1.71% |
| 1990 | 593 | +1.29% |
| 1999 | 658 | +1.16% |
| 2007 | 668 | +0.19% |
| 2012 | 713 | +1.31% |
| 2017 | 759 | +1.26% |
| 2023 | 747 | −0.27% |
Source: INSEE

== See also ==
- Communes of the Vienne department
