= Sossais =

Sossay
- Commune
- Location of Sossay
- Location within France Location within Nouvelle-Aquitaine
- Coordinates: 46°51′33″N 0°23′12″E
- Country: France
- Region: Nouvelle-Aquitaine
- Department: Vienne
- Arrondissement: Châtellerault
- Canton: Châtellerault-2
- Intercommunality: CA Grand Châtellerault

Government
  - Mayor (2020–2026): Christian Pépin
- Area^{1}: 12.04 km^{2} (4.65 sq mi)
- Elevation: 115 m (377 ft)
- Highest elevation: 161 m (528 ft)
- Lowest elevation: 90 m (300 ft)
- Population (2023): 409
  - Density: 34.0/km^{2} (88.0/sq mi)
- Time zone: UTC+01:00 (CET)
  - Summer (DST): UTC+02:00 (CEST)
- INSEE/Postal code: 86265 /86230
- ^{1} French Land Register data, which excludes lakes, ponds, glaciers > 1 km^{2} (0.386 sq mi or 247 acres) and river estuaries.

Sossay (French pronunciation: [sɔsɛ]) is a commune in the Vienne department in the Nouvelle-Aquitaine region in western France.

== Demographics ==
Historical population
Year	Pop.	±% p.a.
1968	396	—
1975	411	+0.53%
1982	375	−1.30%
1990	413	+1.21%
1999	399	−0.38%
2007	403	+0.12%
2012	475	+3.34%
2017	438	−1.61%
2023	409	−1.14%
Source: INSEE

== See also ==
- Communes of the Vienne department
