= Verrue =

- Commune
- Location of Verrue
- Location within France Location within Nouvelle-Aquitaine
- Coordinates: 46°51′50″N 0°10′23″E
- Country: France
- Region: Nouvelle-Aquitaine
- Department: Vienne
- Arrondissement: Châtellerault
- Canton: Loudun
- Intercommunality: Pays Loudunais

Government
  - Mayor (2020–2026): Francis Siclet
- Area^{1}: 28.44 km^{2} (10.98 sq mi)
- Elevation: 80 m (260 ft)
- Highest elevation: 140 m (460 ft)
- Lowest elevation: 69 m (226 ft)
- Population (2023): 379
  - Density: 13.3/km^{2} (34.5/sq mi)
- Time zone: UTC+01:00 (CET)
  - Summer (DST): UTC+02:00 (CEST)
- INSEE/Postal code: 86286 /86420
- ^{1} French Land Register data, which excludes lakes, ponds, glaciers > 1 km^{2} (0.386 sq mi or 247 acres) and river estuaries.

Verrue (French pronunciation: [vɛʁy]) is a commune in the Vienne department in the Nouvelle-Aquitaine region in western France.

== Demographics ==
Historical population
Year	Pop.	±% p.a.
1968	541	—
1975	463	−2.20%
1982	399	−2.10%
1990	369	−0.97%
1999	351	−0.55%
2007	374	+0.80%
2012	398	+1.25%
2017	391	−0.35%
2023	379	−0.52%
Source: INSEE

== See also ==
- Communes of the Vienne department
