= Les Ormes, Vienne =

Les Ormes
- Commune
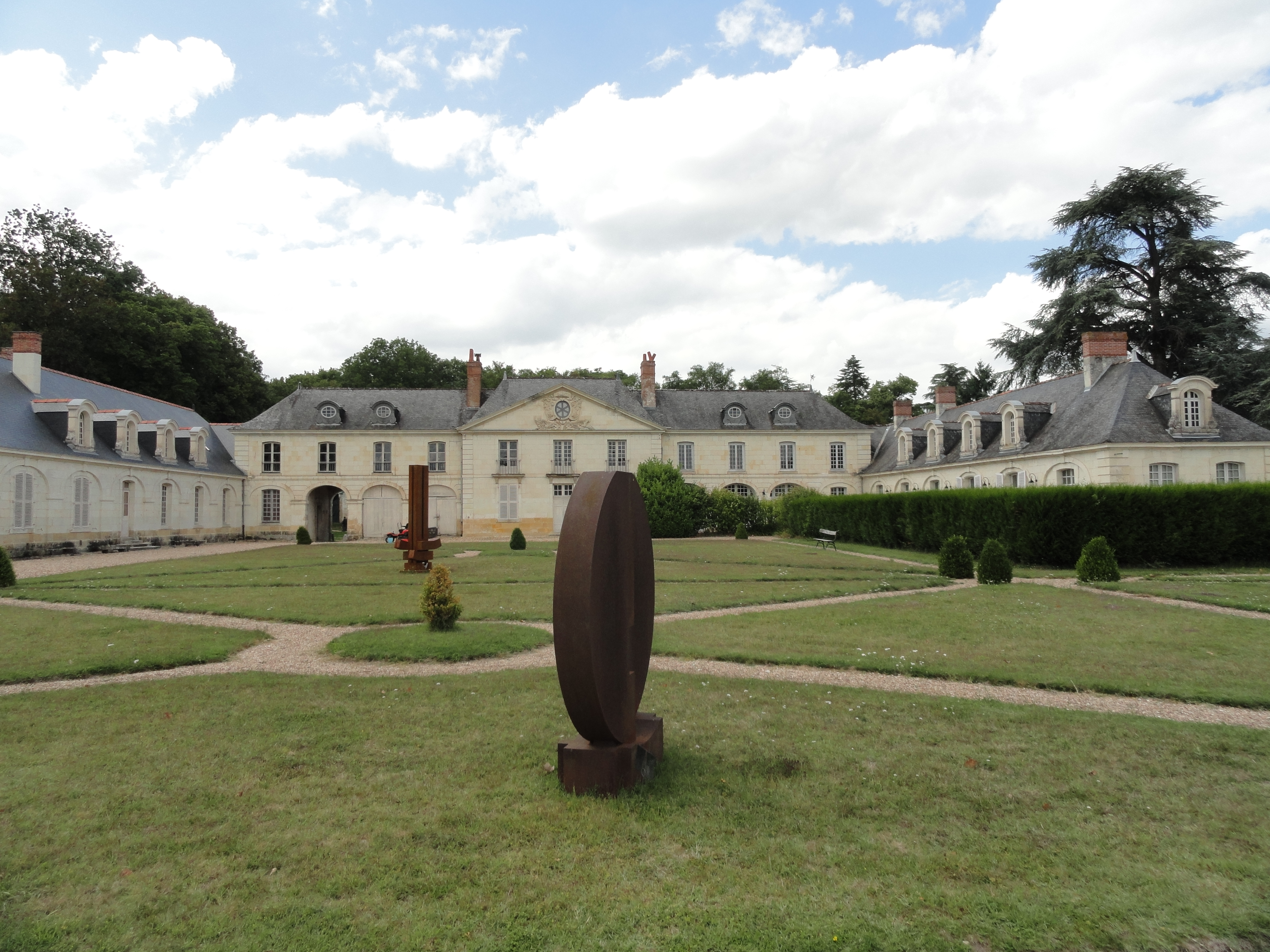
- Château des Ormes
- Location of Les Ormes
- Location within France Location within Nouvelle-Aquitaine
- Coordinates: 46°58′22″N 0°36′25″E
- Country: France
- Region: Nouvelle-Aquitaine
- Department: Vienne
- Arrondissement: Châtellerault
- Canton: Châtellerault-2
- Intercommunality: CA Grand Châtellerault

Government
  - Mayor (2020–2026): Béatrice Fontaine
- Area^{1}: 24.22 km^{2} (9.35 sq mi)
- Elevation: 50 m (160 ft)
- Highest elevation: 116 m (381 ft)
- Lowest elevation: 37 m (121 ft)
- Population (2023): 1,613
  - Density: 66.60/km^{2} (172.5/sq mi)
- Time zone: UTC+01:00 (CET)
  - Summer (DST): UTC+02:00 (CEST)
- INSEE/Postal code: 86183 /86220
- ^{1} French Land Register data, which excludes lakes, ponds, glaciers > 1 km^{2} (0.386 sq mi or 247 acres) and river estuaries.

Les Ormes (French pronunciation: [le.z‿ɔʁm]) is a commune in the Vienne department in the Nouvelle-Aquitaine region in western France.

Château des Ormes, once the seat of Marc-Pierre de Voyer de Paulmy d'Argenson (1696–1764), Minister of War for Louis XV, is located in the commune.

== Demographics ==
Historical population
Year	Pop.	±% p.a.
1968	1,435	—
1975	1,394	−0.41%
1982	1,473	+0.79%
1990	1,386	−0.76%
1999	1,431	+0.36%
2007	1,557	+1.06%
2012	1,666	+1.36%
2017	1,631	−0.42%
2023	1,613	−0.18%
Source: INSEE

== See also ==
- Communes of the Vienne department
