= Ingrandes, Vienne =

Ingrandes
- Commune
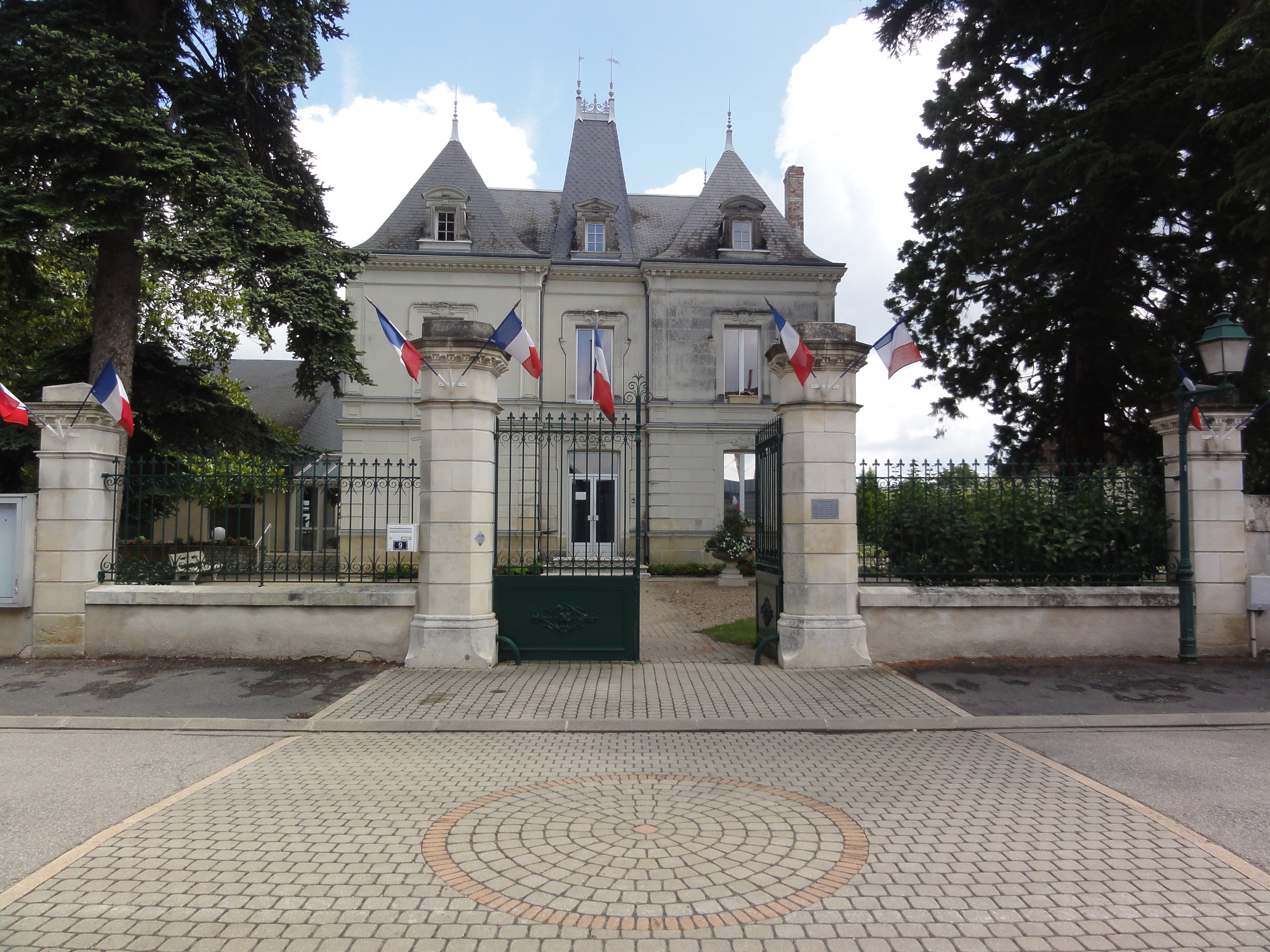
- The town hall in Ingrandes-sur-Vienne

- Coat of arms
- Location of Ingrandes
- Location within France Location within Nouvelle-Aquitaine
- Coordinates: 46°52′36″N 0°34′04″E
- Country: France
- Region: Nouvelle-Aquitaine
- Department: Vienne
- Arrondissement: Châtellerault
- Canton: Châtellerault-2
- Intercommunality: CA Grand Châtellerault

Government
  - Mayor (2020–2026): Bénédicte de Courreges
- Area^{1}: 35.03 km^{2} (13.53 sq mi)
- Elevation: 51 m (167 ft)
- Highest elevation: 135 m (443 ft)
- Lowest elevation: 37 m (121 ft)
- Population (2023): 1,709
  - Density: 48.79/km^{2} (126.4/sq mi)
- Time zone: UTC+01:00 (CET)
  - Summer (DST): UTC+02:00 (CEST)
- INSEE/Postal code: 86111 /86220
- ^{1} French Land Register data, which excludes lakes, ponds, glaciers > 1 km^{2} (0.386 sq mi or 247 acres) and river estuaries.

Ingrandes (French pronunciation: [ɛ̃ɡʁɑ̃d]), also known as Ingrandes-sur-Vienne, is a commune in the Vienne department, region of Nouvelle-Aquitaine, western France.

== Demographics ==
Historical population
Year	Pop.	±% p.a.
1968	950	—
1975	1,461	+6.34%
1982	1,700	+2.19%
1990	1,765	+0.47%
1999	1,723	−0.27%
2007	1,812	+0.63%
2012	1,755	−0.64%
2017	1,750	−0.06%
2023	1,709	−0.39%
Source: INSEE

== See also ==
- Communes of the Vienne department
