= Oyré =

- Commune
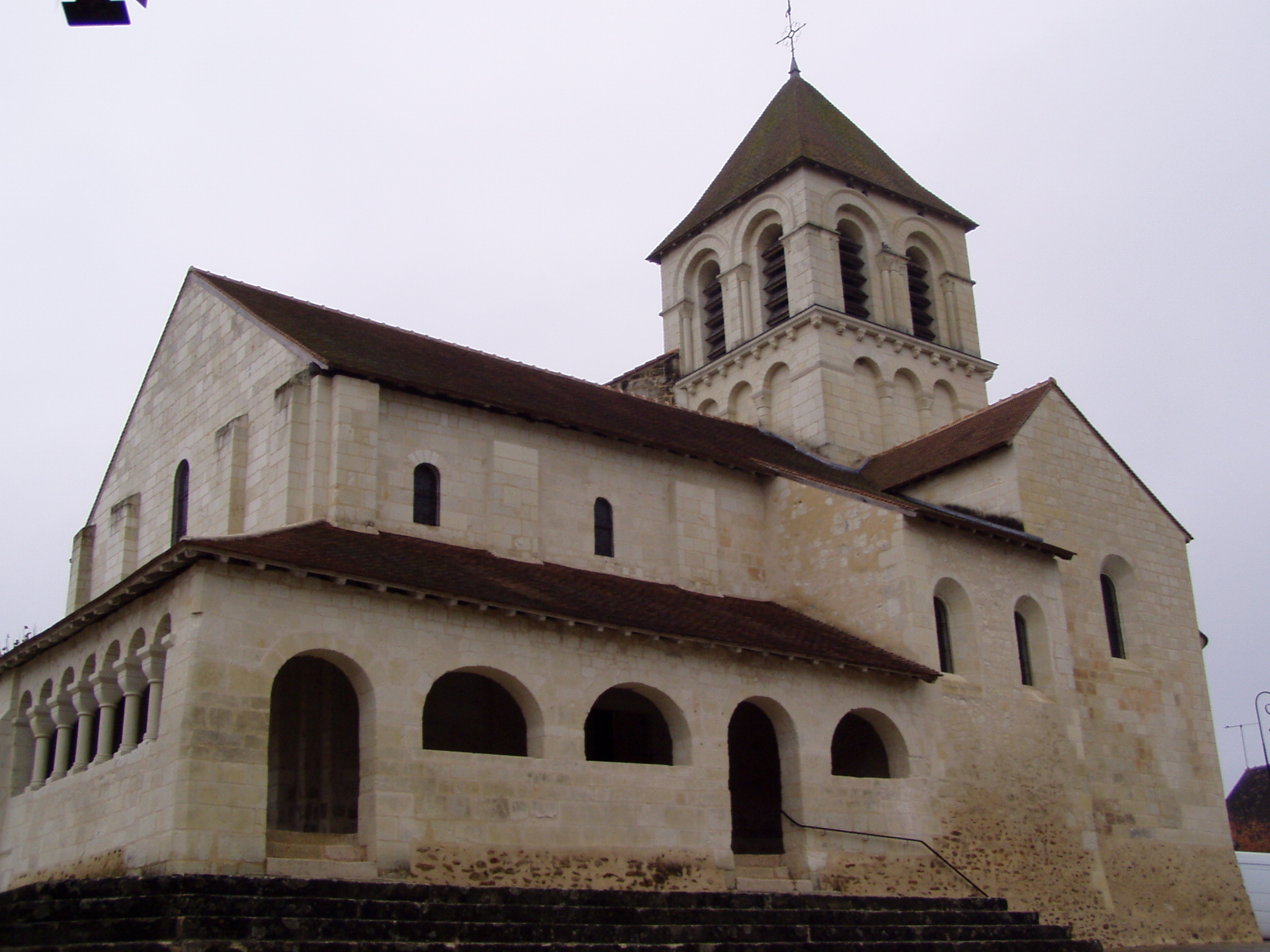
- The church of Saint-Sulpice, in Oyré
- Location of Oyré
- Location within France Location within Nouvelle-Aquitaine
- Coordinates: 46°52′25″N 0°37′46″E
- Country: France
- Region: Nouvelle-Aquitaine
- Department: Vienne
- Arrondissement: Châtellerault
- Canton: Châtellerault-2
- Intercommunality: CA Grand Châtellerault

Government
  - Mayor (2020–2026): Géry Wibaux
- Area^{1}: 33.19 km^{2} (12.81 sq mi)
- Elevation: 75 m (246 ft)
- Highest elevation: 147 m (482 ft)
- Lowest elevation: 61 m (200 ft)
- Population (2023): 962
  - Density: 29.0/km^{2} (75.1/sq mi)
- Time zone: UTC+01:00 (CET)
  - Summer (DST): UTC+02:00 (CEST)
- INSEE/Postal code: 86186 /86220
- ^{1} French Land Register data, which excludes lakes, ponds, glaciers > 1 km^{2} (0.386 sq mi or 247 acres) and river estuaries.

Oyré (French pronunciation: [waʁe]) is a commune in the Vienne department in the Nouvelle-Aquitaine region in western France.

== Geography ==
Oyré lies 7 km (4.3 mi) north of Châtellerault.

== Demographics ==
Historical population
| Year | Pop. | ±% p.a. |
|---|---|---|
| 1968 | 692 | — |
| 1975 | 621 | −1.53% |
| 1982 | 741 | +2.56% |
| 1990 | 877 | +2.13% |
| 1999 | 888 | +0.14% |
| 2007 | 906 | +0.25% |
| 2012 | 1,022 | +2.44% |
| 2017 | 973 | −0.98% |
| 2023 | 962 | −0.19% |
Source: INSEE

== See also ==
- Communes of the Vienne department
