= Guesnes =

- Commune
- Location of Guesnes
- Location within France Location within Nouvelle-Aquitaine
- Coordinates: 46°55′03″N 0°09′50″E
- Country: France
- Region: Nouvelle-Aquitaine
- Department: Vienne
- Arrondissement: Châtellerault
- Canton: Loudun
- Intercommunality: Pays Loudunais

Government
  - Mayor (2020–2026): Werner Kervarec
- Area^{1}: 12.98 km^{2} (5.01 sq mi)
- Elevation: 71 m (233 ft)
- Highest elevation: 91 m (299 ft)
- Lowest elevation: 61 m (200 ft)
- Population (2023): 239
  - Density: 18.4/km^{2} (47.7/sq mi)
- Time zone: UTC+01:00 (CET)
  - Summer (DST): UTC+02:00 (CEST)
- INSEE/Postal code: 86109 /86420
- ^{1} French Land Register data, which excludes lakes, ponds, glaciers > 1 km^{2} (0.386 sq mi or 247 acres) and river estuaries.

Guesnes (French pronunciation: [ɡɛn]) is a commune in the Vienne department in the Nouvelle-Aquitaine region in western France.

== Demographics ==
Historical population
Year	Pop.	±% p.a.
1968	322	—
1975	275	−2.23%
1982	259	−0.85%
1990	245	−0.69%
1999	262	+0.75%
2007	234	−1.40%
2012	240	+0.51%
2017	222	−1.55%
2023	239	+1.24%
Source: INSEE

== See also ==
- Communes of the Vienne department
