= Port-de-Piles =

- Commune
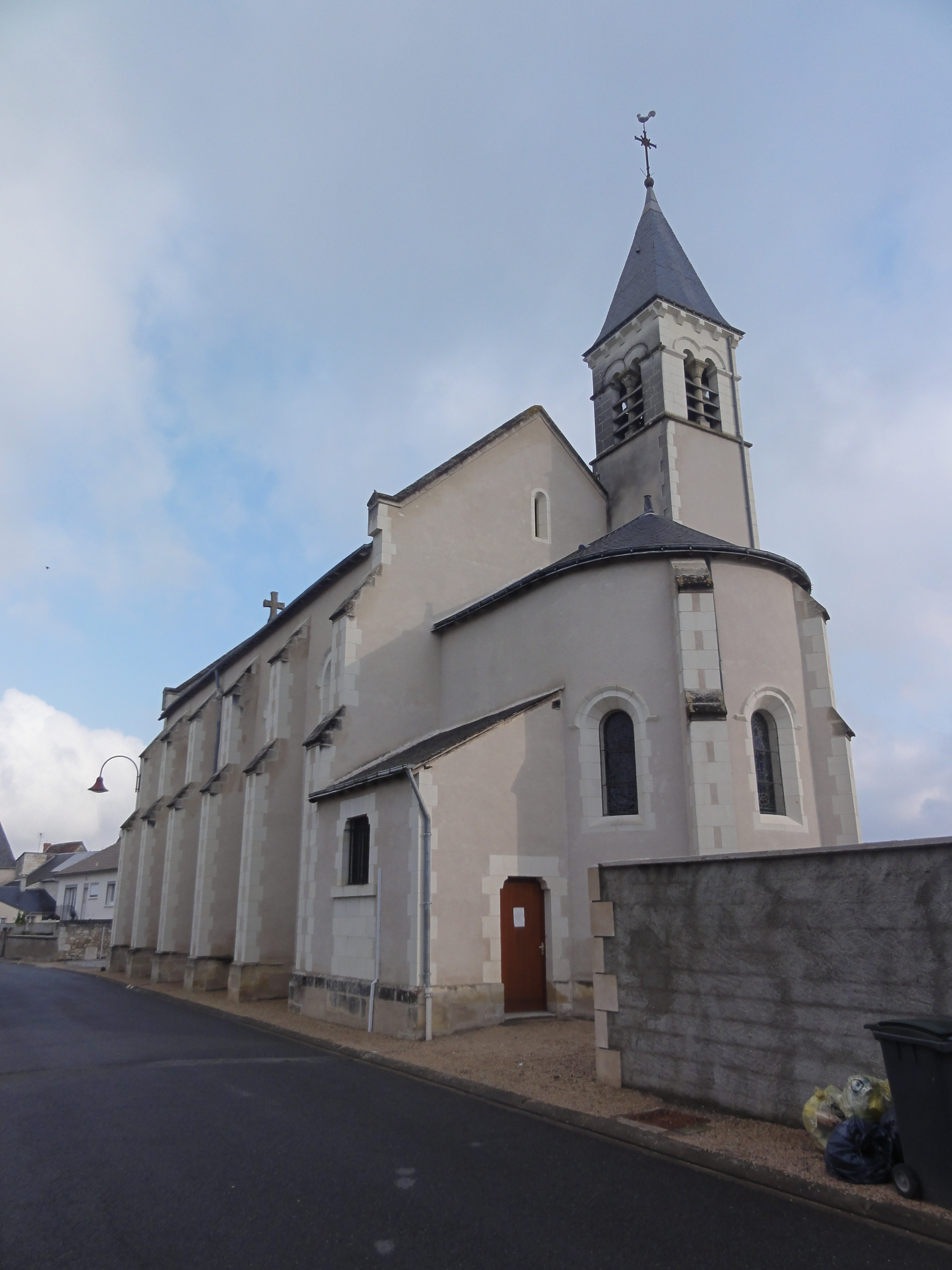
- The church in Port-de-Piles
- Location of Port-de-Piles
- Location within France Location within Nouvelle-Aquitaine
- Coordinates: 47°00′12″N 0°36′02″E
- Country: France
- Region: Nouvelle-Aquitaine
- Department: Vienne
- Arrondissement: Châtellerault
- Canton: Châtellerault-2
- Intercommunality: CA Grand Châtellerault

Government
  - Mayor (2020–2026): Pascal Barbot
- Area^{1}: 5.32 km^{2} (2.05 sq mi)
- Elevation: 47 m (154 ft)
- Highest elevation: 49 m (161 ft)
- Lowest elevation: 37 m (121 ft)
- Population (2023): 545
  - Density: 102/km^{2} (265/sq mi)
- Time zone: UTC+01:00 (CET)
  - Summer (DST): UTC+02:00 (CEST)
- INSEE/Postal code: 86195 /86220
- ^{1} French Land Register data, which excludes lakes, ponds, glaciers > 1 km^{2} (0.386 sq mi or 247 acres) and river estuaries.

Port-de-Piles (French pronunciation: [pɔʁ də pil]) is a commune in the Vienne department and the Nouvelle-Aquitaine region, western France.

== Demographics ==
Historical population
| Year | Pop. | ±% p.a. |
|---|---|---|
| 1968 | 562 | — |
| 1975 | 608 | +1.13% |
| 1982 | 577 | −0.74% |
| 1990 | 487 | −2.10% |
| 1999 | 513 | +0.58% |
| 2007 | 530 | +0.41% |
| 2012 | 552 | +0.82% |
| 2017 | 566 | +0.50% |
| 2023 | 545 | −0.63% |
Source: INSEE

== See also ==
- Communes of the Vienne department
