= Vézières =

- Commune
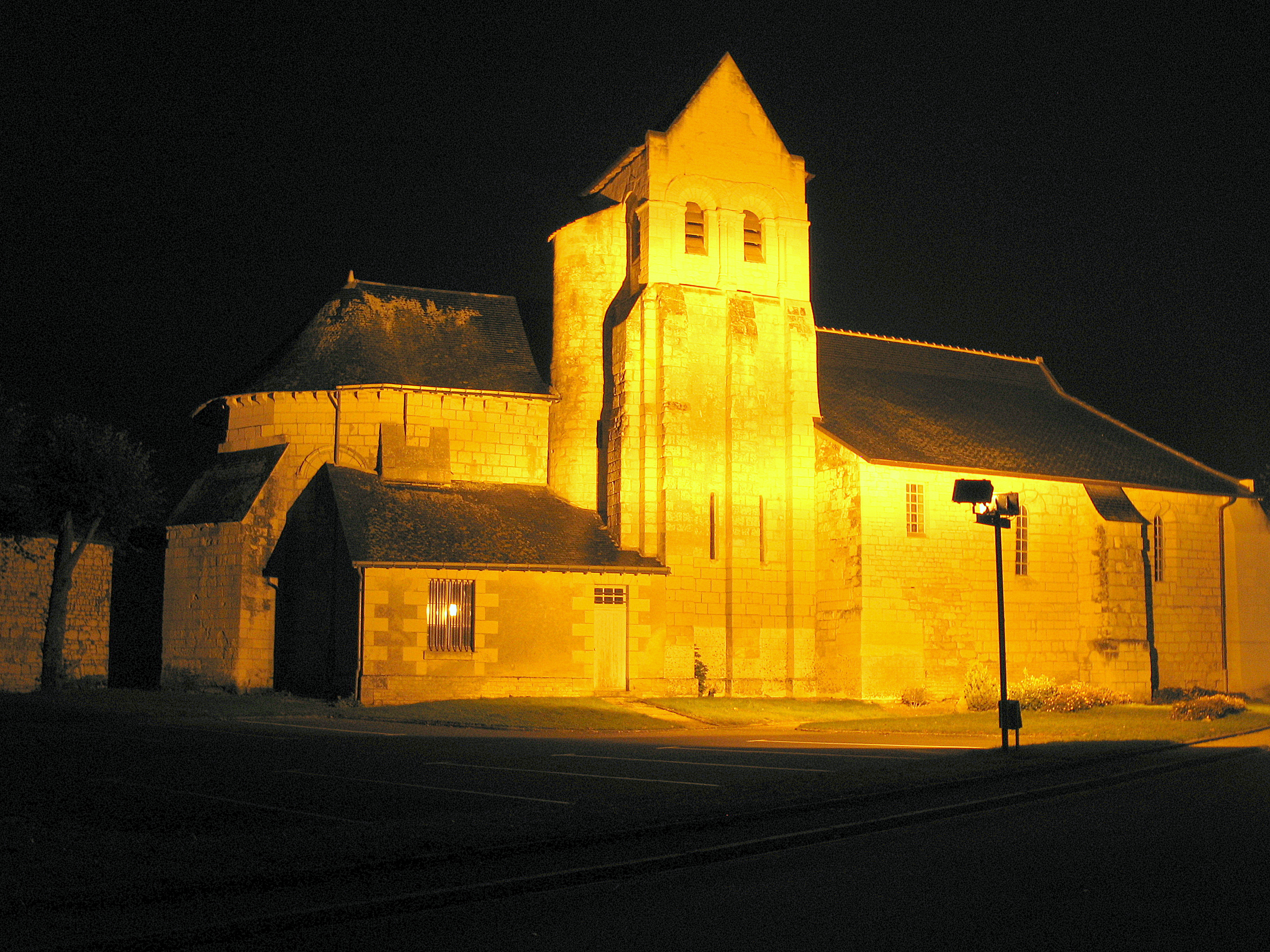
- The church in Vézières
- Location of Vézières
- Location within France Location within Nouvelle-Aquitaine
- Coordinates: 47°05′16″N 0°06′02″E
- Country: France
- Region: Nouvelle-Aquitaine
- Department: Vienne
- Arrondissement: Châtellerault
- Canton: Loudun
- Intercommunality: Pays Loudunais

Government
  - Mayor (2020–2026): Jacky Durand
- Area^{1}: 26.31 km^{2} (10.16 sq mi)
- Elevation: 75 m (246 ft)
- Highest elevation: 107 m (351 ft)
- Lowest elevation: 39 m (128 ft)
- Population (2023): 340
  - Density: 13/km^{2} (33/sq mi)
- Time zone: UTC+01:00 (CET)
  - Summer (DST): UTC+02:00 (CEST)
- INSEE/Postal code: 86287 /86120
- ^{1} French Land Register data, which excludes lakes, ponds, glaciers > 1 km^{2} (0.386 sq mi or 247 acres) and river estuaries.

Vézières (French pronunciation: [vezjɛʁ]) is a commune in the Vienne department in the Nouvelle-Aquitaine region in western France.

== Demographics ==
Historical population
Year	Pop.	±% p.a.
1968	535	—
1975	453	−2.35%
1982	390	−2.12%
1990	370	−0.66%
1999	358	−0.37%
2007	350	−0.28%
2012	360	+0.57%
2017	357	−0.17%
2023	340	−0.81%
Source: INSEE

== See also ==
- Communes of the Vienne department
