= Berthegon =

- Commune
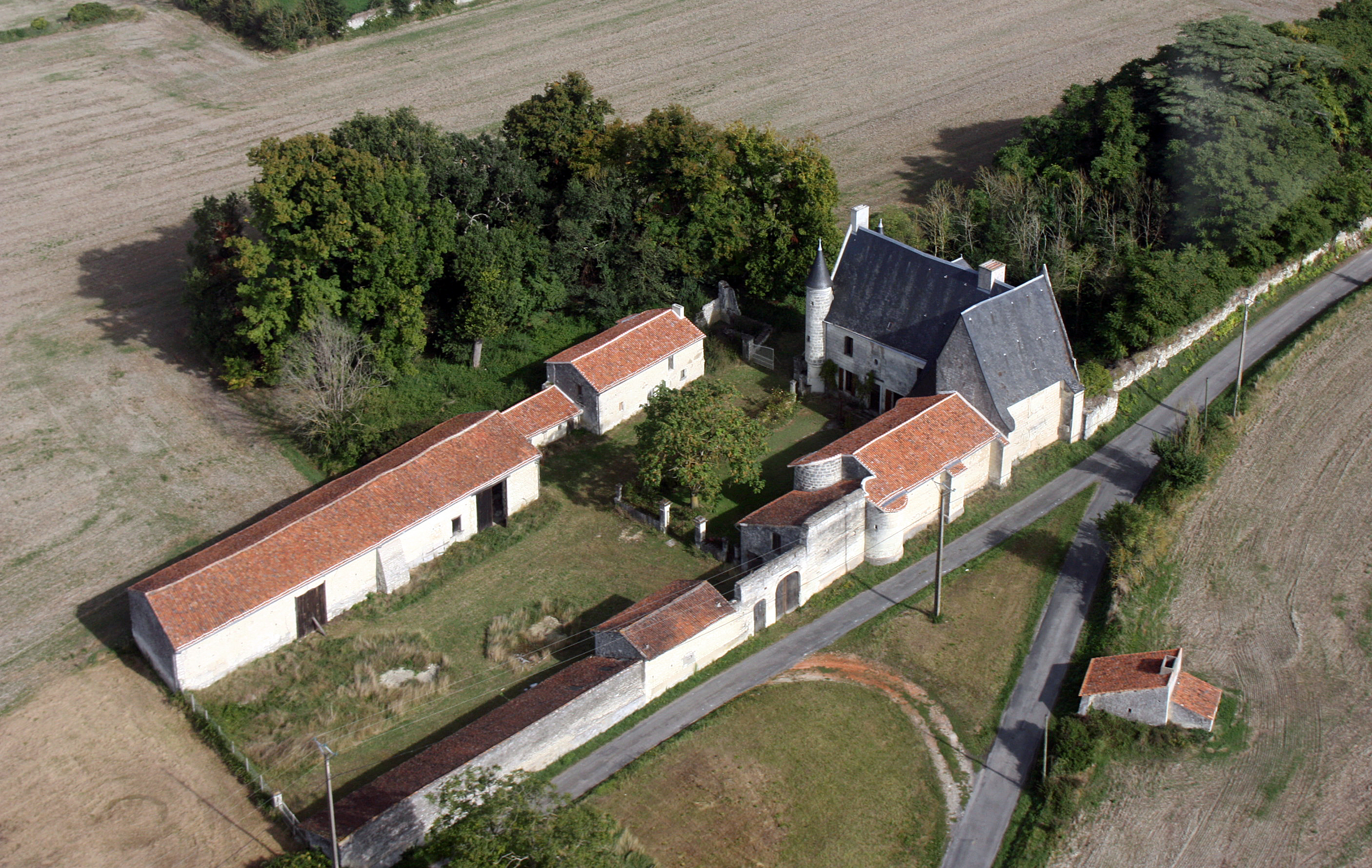
- The Manor of Vayolles
- Location of Berthegon
- Location within France Location within Nouvelle-Aquitaine
- Coordinates: 46°53′52″N 0°15′50″E
- Country: France
- Region: Nouvelle-Aquitaine
- Department: Vienne
- Arrondissement: Châtellerault
- Canton: Loudun
- Intercommunality: Pays Loudunais

Government
  - Mayor (2020–2026): Jean Roch Thiolet
- Area^{1}: 10.61 km^{2} (4.10 sq mi)
- Elevation: 83 m (272 ft)
- Highest elevation: 136 m (446 ft)
- Lowest elevation: 66 m (217 ft)
- Population (2023): 259
  - Density: 24.4/km^{2} (63.2/sq mi)
- Time zone: UTC+01:00 (CET)
  - Summer (DST): UTC+02:00 (CEST)
- INSEE/Postal code: 86023 /86420
- ^{1} French Land Register data, which excludes lakes, ponds, glaciers > 1 km^{2} (0.386 sq mi or 247 acres) and river estuaries.

Berthegon (French pronunciation: [bɛʁtəɡɔ̃]) is a commune in the Vienne department in the Nouvelle-Aquitaine region in western France.

== See also ==
- Communes of the Vienne department
