= Messemé =

- Commune
- Location of Messemé
- Location within France Location within Nouvelle-Aquitaine
- Coordinates: 47°00′45″N 0°10′38″E
- Country: France
- Region: Nouvelle-Aquitaine
- Department: Vienne
- Arrondissement: Châtellerault
- Canton: Loudun
- Intercommunality: Pays Loudunais

Government
  - Mayor (2020–2026): Isabelle François
- Area^{1}: 9.84 km^{2} (3.80 sq mi)
- Elevation: 8,498 m (27,881 ft)
- Highest elevation: 108 m (354 ft)
- Lowest elevation: 76 m (249 ft)
- Population (2023): 243
  - Density: 24.7/km^{2} (64.0/sq mi)
- Time zone: UTC+01:00 (CET)
  - Summer (DST): UTC+02:00 (CEST)
- INSEE/Postal code: 86156 /86200
- ^{1} French Land Register data, which excludes lakes, ponds, glaciers > 1 km^{2} (0.386 sq mi or 247 acres) and river estuaries.

Messemé is a commune in the Vienne department and Nouvelle-Aquitaine region of western France.

== Demographics ==
Historical population
Year	Pop.	±% p.a.
1968	273	—
1975	236	−2.06%
1982	232	−0.24%
1990	205	−1.53%
1999	206	+0.05%
2007	214	+0.48%
2012	224	+0.92%
2017	239	+1.30%
2023	243	+0.28%
Source: INSEE

== See also ==
- Communes of the Vienne department
