= Mazeuil =

- Commune
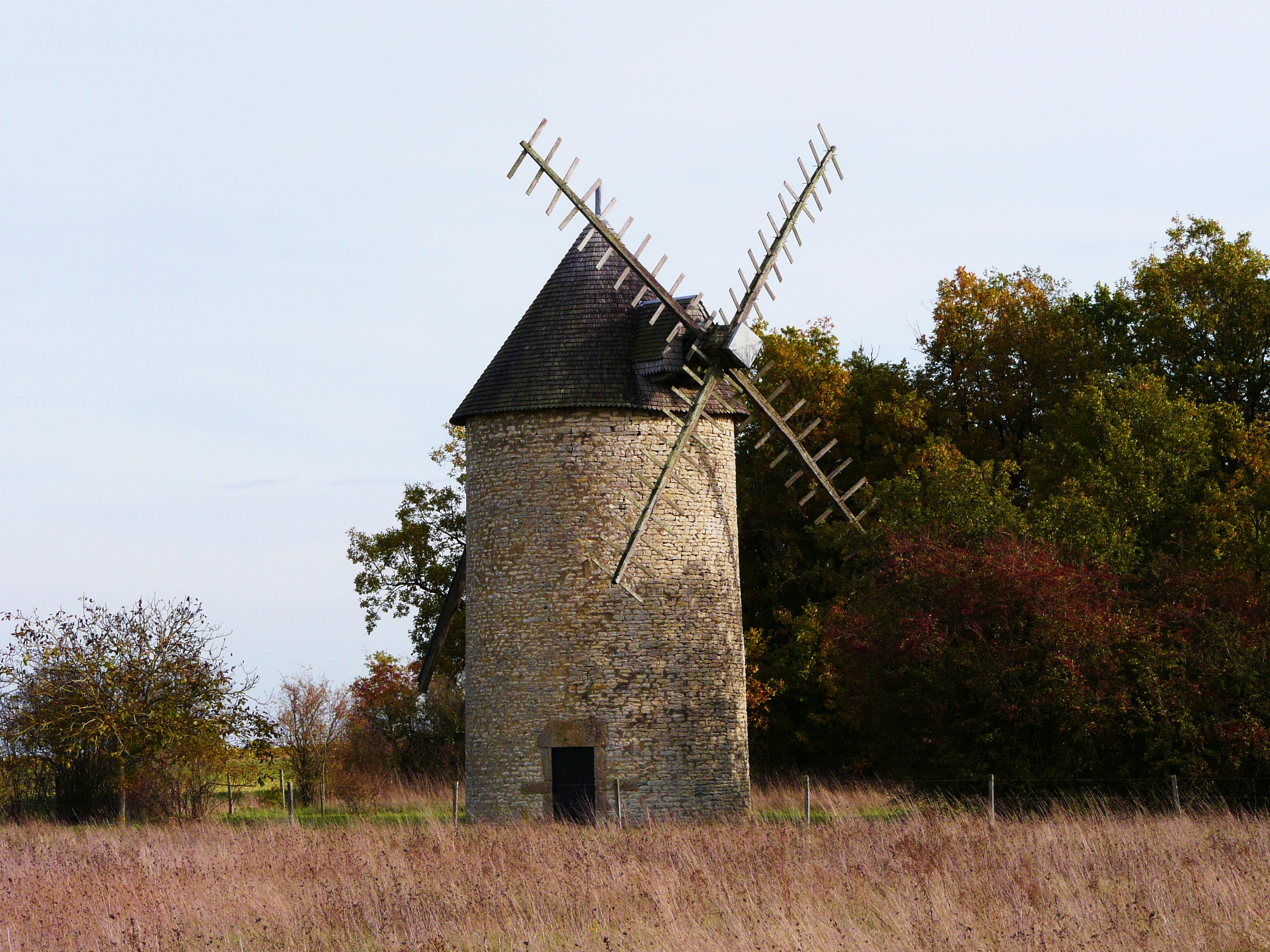
- The Bellien windmill, in Mazeuil
- Location of Mazeuil
- Location within France Location within Nouvelle-Aquitaine
- Coordinates: 46°47′17″N 0°05′05″E
- Country: France
- Region: Nouvelle-Aquitaine
- Department: Vienne
- Arrondissement: Châtellerault
- Canton: Loudun
- Intercommunality: Pays Loudunais

Government
  - Mayor (2020–2026): Patrice Francois
- Area^{1}: 13.63 km^{2} (5.26 sq mi)
- Elevation: 101 m (331 ft)
- Highest elevation: 125 m (410 ft)
- Lowest elevation: 83 m (272 ft)
- Population (2023): 243
  - Density: 17.8/km^{2} (46.2/sq mi)
- Time zone: UTC+01:00 (CET)
  - Summer (DST): UTC+02:00 (CEST)
- INSEE/Postal code: 86154 /86110
- ^{1} French Land Register data, which excludes lakes, ponds, glaciers > 1 km^{2} (0.386 sq mi or 247 acres) and river estuaries.

Mazeuil (French pronunciation: [mazœj]) is a commune in the Vienne department in the Nouvelle-Aquitaine region in western France.

== Demographics ==
Historical population
Year	Pop.	±% p.a.
1968	308	—
1975	298	−0.47%
1982	280	−0.89%
1990	273	−0.32%
1999	254	−0.80%
2007	245	−0.45%
2012	221	−2.04%
2017	253	+2.74%
2023	243	−0.67%
Source: INSEE

== See also ==
- Communes of the Vienne department
