= Ouzilly =

- Commune
- Location of Ouzilly
- Location within France Location within Nouvelle-Aquitaine
- Coordinates: 46°46′38″N 0°21′45″E
- Country: France
- Region: Nouvelle-Aquitaine
- Department: Vienne
- Arrondissement: Châtellerault
- Canton: Châtellerault-1
- Intercommunality: CA Grand Châtellerault

Government
  - Mayor (2020–2026): Franck Reby
- Area^{1}: 10.63 km^{2} (4.10 sq mi)
- Elevation: 79 m (259 ft)
- Highest elevation: 102 m (335 ft)
- Lowest elevation: 62 m (203 ft)
- Population (2023): 961
  - Density: 90.4/km^{2} (234/sq mi)
- Time zone: UTC+01:00 (CET)
  - Summer (DST): UTC+02:00 (CEST)
- INSEE/Postal code: 86184 /86380
- ^{1} French Land Register data, which excludes lakes, ponds, glaciers > 1 km^{2} (0.386 sq mi or 247 acres) and river estuaries.

Ouzilly (French pronunciation: [uziji]) is a commune in the Vienne department in the Nouvelle-Aquitaine region in western France.

== Demographics ==
Historical population
Year	Pop.	±% p.a.
1968	655	—
1975	641	−0.31%
1982	681	+0.87%
1990	649	−0.60%
1999	706	+0.94%
2007	802	+1.61%
2012	898	+2.29%
2017	919	+0.46%
2023	961	+0.75%
Source: INSEE

== See also ==
- Communes of the Vienne department
