= Ceaux-en-Loudun =

- Commune
- Location of Ceaux-en-Loudun
- Location within France Location within Nouvelle-Aquitaine
- Coordinates: 47°01′37″N 0°14′23″E
- Country: France
- Region: Nouvelle-Aquitaine
- Department: Vienne
- Arrondissement: Châtellerault
- Canton: Loudun
- Intercommunality: Pays Loudunais

Government
  - Mayor (2020–2026): Régis Savaton
- Area^{1}: 28.89 km^{2} (11.15 sq mi)
- Elevation: 82 m (269 ft)
- Highest elevation: 109 m (358 ft)
- Lowest elevation: 46 m (151 ft)
- Population (2023): 560
  - Density: 19/km^{2} (50/sq mi)
- Time zone: UTC+01:00 (CET)
  - Summer (DST): UTC+02:00 (CEST)
- INSEE/Postal code: 86044 /86200
- ^{1} French Land Register data, which excludes lakes, ponds, glaciers > 1 km^{2} (0.386 sq mi or 247 acres) and river estuaries.

Ceaux-en-Loudun is a commune in the Vienne department in the Nouvelle-Aquitaine region in western France.

== Demographics ==
Its inhabitants are called Ceauxois (male) and Ceauxoises (female) or Ceaussois (male) and Ceaussoises (female) in French.

Historical population
Year	Pop.	±% p.a.
1968	648	—
1975	589	−1.35%
1982	584	−0.12%
1990	596	+0.25%
1999	579	−0.32%
2007	592	+0.28%
2012	602	+0.34%
2017	553	−1.68%
2023	560	+0.21%
Source: INSEE

== See also ==
- Communes of the Vienne department
