= Mondion =

- Commune
- Location of Mondion
- Location within France Location within Nouvelle-Aquitaine
- Coordinates: 46°56′17″N 0°29′07″E
- Country: France
- Region: Nouvelle-Aquitaine
- Department: Vienne
- Arrondissement: Châtellerault
- Canton: Châtellerault-2
- Intercommunality: CA Grand Châtellerault

Government
  - Mayor (2020–2026): Francis Souriau
- Area^{1}: 8.91 km^{2} (3.44 sq mi)
- Elevation: 233 m (764 ft)
- Highest elevation: 134 m (440 ft)
- Lowest elevation: 78 m (256 ft)
- Population (2023): 120
  - Density: 13/km^{2} (35/sq mi)
- Time zone: UTC+01:00 (CET)
  - Summer (DST): UTC+02:00 (CEST)
- INSEE/Postal code: 86162 /86230
- ^{1} French Land Register data, which excludes lakes, ponds, glaciers > 1 km^{2} (0.386 sq mi or 247 acres) and river estuaries.

Mondion (French pronunciation: [mɔ̃djɔ̃]) is a commune in the Vienne department in the Nouvelle-Aquitaine region in western France.

== Demographics ==
Historical population
Year	Pop.	±% p.a.
1968	142	—
1975	124	−1.92%
1982	123	−0.12%
1990	132	+0.89%
1999	149	+1.36%
2007	135	−1.23%
2012	114	−3.32%
2017	106	−1.44%
2023	120	+2.09%
Source: INSEE

== See also ==
- Communes of the Vienne department
