= Orches =

- Commune
- Location of Orches
- Location within France Location within Nouvelle-Aquitaine
- Coordinates: 46°53′01″N 0°19′20″E
- Country: France
- Region: Nouvelle-Aquitaine
- Department: Vienne
- Arrondissement: Châtellerault
- Canton: Châtellerault-2
- Intercommunality: CA Grand Châtellerault

Government
  - Mayor (2020–2026): Valérie Leau
- Area^{1}: 19.22 km^{2} (7.42 sq mi)
- Elevation: 108 m (354 ft)
- Highest elevation: 167 m (548 ft)
- Lowest elevation: 70 m (230 ft)
- Population (2023): 353
  - Density: 18.4/km^{2} (47.6/sq mi)
- Time zone: UTC+01:00 (CET)
  - Summer (DST): UTC+02:00 (CEST)
- INSEE/Postal code: 86182 /86230
- ^{1} French Land Register data, which excludes lakes, ponds, glaciers > 1 km^{2} (0.386 sq mi or 247 acres) and river estuaries.

Orches (French pronunciation: [ɔʁʃ]) is a commune in the Vienne department in the Nouvelle-Aquitaine region in western France.

== Population ==
Historical population
Year	Pop.	±% p.a.
1968	437	—
1975	354	−2.96%
1982	371	+0.67%
1990	378	+0.23%
1999	366	−0.36%
2007	410	+1.43%
2012	389	−1.05%
2017	410	+1.06%
2023	353	−2.46%
Source: INSEE

== See also ==
- Communes of the Vienne department
