= Dercé =

- Commune
- Location of Dercé
- Location within France Location within Nouvelle-Aquitaine
- Coordinates: 46°56′32″N 0°13′06″E
- Country: France
- Region: Nouvelle-Aquitaine
- Department: Vienne
- Arrondissement: Châtellerault
- Canton: Loudun
- Intercommunality: Pays Loudunais

Government
  - Mayor (2020–2026): Christophe Bruneau
- Area^{1}: 12.28 km^{2} (4.74 sq mi)
- Elevation: 140 m (460 ft)
- Highest elevation: 136 m (446 ft)
- Lowest elevation: 62 m (203 ft)
- Population (2023): 162
  - Density: 13.2/km^{2} (34.2/sq mi)
- Time zone: UTC+01:00 (CET)
  - Summer (DST): UTC+02:00 (CEST)
- INSEE/Postal code: 86093 /86420
- ^{1} French Land Register data, which excludes lakes, ponds, glaciers > 1 km^{2} (0.386 sq mi or 247 acres) and river estuaries.

Dercé (French pronunciation: [dɛʁse]) is a commune in the Vienne department in the Nouvelle-Aquitaine region in western France.

== Demographics ==
Historical population
Year	Pop.	±% p.a.
1968	345	—
1975	294	−2.26%
1982	235	−3.15%
1990	188	−2.75%
1999	170	−1.11%
2007	160	−0.75%
2012	165	+0.62%
2017	155	−1.24%
2023	162	+0.74%
Source: INSEE

== See also ==
- Communes of the Vienne department
