= Lencloître =

- Commune
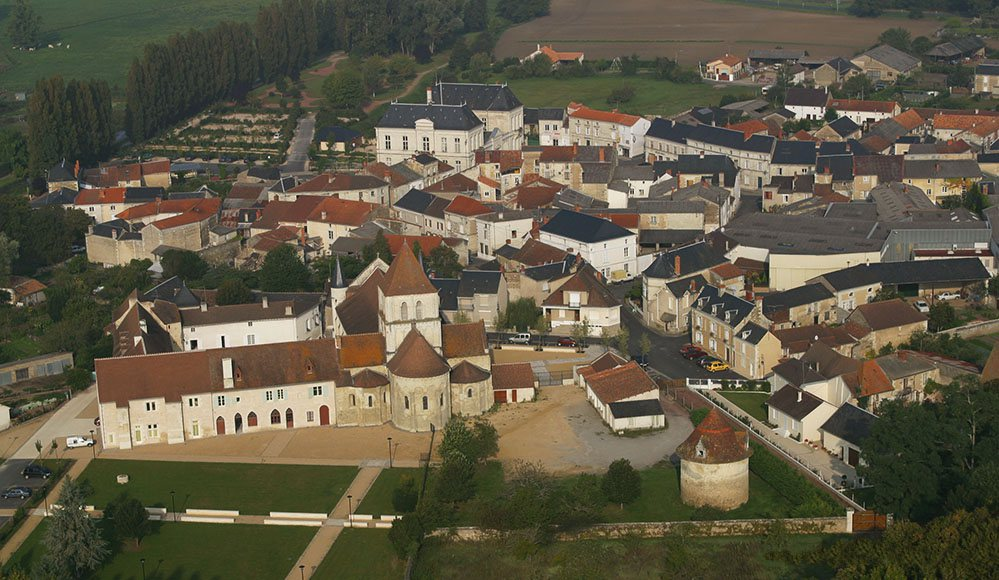
- The church and surrounding buildings in Lencloître

- Coat of arms
- Location of Lencloître
- Location within France Location within Nouvelle-Aquitaine
- Coordinates: 46°48′54″N 0°19′45″E
- Country: France
- Region: Nouvelle-Aquitaine
- Department: Vienne
- Arrondissement: Châtellerault
- Canton: Châtellerault-1
- Intercommunality: CA Grand Châtellerault

Government
  - Mayor (2020–2026): Henri Colin
- Area^{1}: 19.04 km^{2} (7.35 sq mi)
- Elevation: 79 m (259 ft)
- Highest elevation: 107 m (351 ft)
- Lowest elevation: 65 m (213 ft)
- Population (2023): 2,483
  - Density: 130.4/km^{2} (337.8/sq mi)
- Time zone: UTC+01:00 (CET)
  - Summer (DST): UTC+02:00 (CEST)
- INSEE/Postal code: 86128 /86140
- ^{1} French Land Register data, which excludes lakes, ponds, glaciers > 1 km^{2} (0.386 sq mi or 247 acres) and river estuaries.

Lencloître (French pronunciation: [lɑ̃klwatʁ]) is a commune in the Vienne department in the Nouvelle-Aquitaine region in western France.

== Demographics ==
Historical population
Year	Pop.	±% p.a.
1968	1,754	—
1975	1,871	+0.93%
1982	2,082	+1.54%
1990	2,222	+0.82%
1999	2,253	+0.15%
2007	2,373	+0.65%
2012	2,508	+1.11%
2017	2,456	−0.42%
2023	2,483	+0.18%
Source: INSEE

== See also ==
- Communes of the Vienne department
