= La Grimaudière =

- Commune
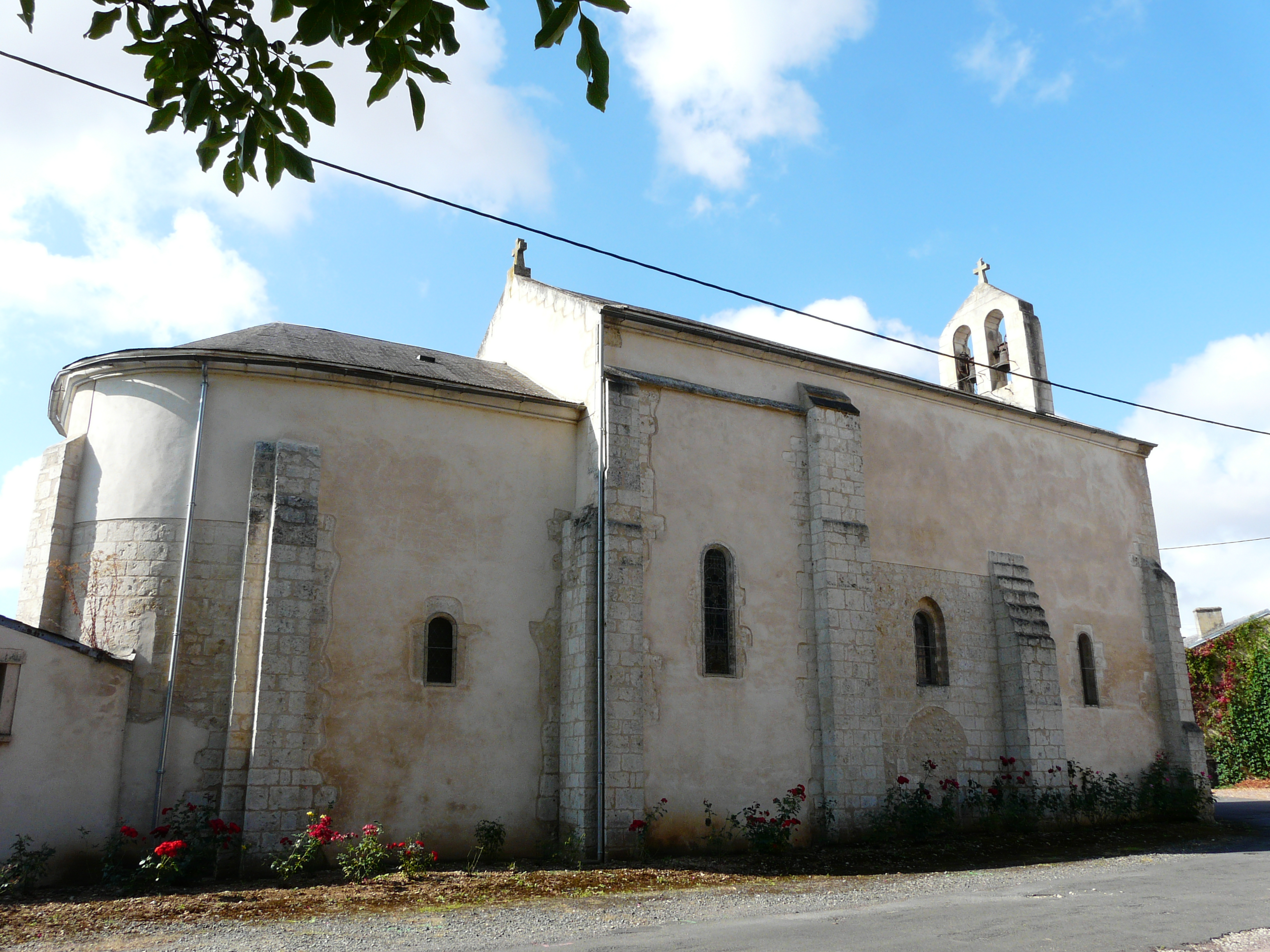
- The church of Saint-Cybard, in La Grimaudière
- Location of La Grimaudière
- Location within France Location within Nouvelle-Aquitaine
- Coordinates: 46°48′29″N 0°01′07″E
- Country: France
- Region: Nouvelle-Aquitaine
- Department: Vienne
- Arrondissement: Châtellerault
- Canton: Loudun
- Intercommunality: Pays Loudunais

Government
  - Mayor (2020–2026): Claude Sergent
- Area^{1}: 19.09 km^{2} (7.37 sq mi)
- Elevation: 92 m (302 ft)
- Highest elevation: 121 m (397 ft)
- Lowest elevation: 76 m (249 ft)
- Population (2023): 392
  - Density: 20.5/km^{2} (53.2/sq mi)
- Time zone: UTC+01:00 (CET)
  - Summer (DST): UTC+02:00 (CEST)
- INSEE/Postal code: 86108 /86330
- ^{1} French Land Register data, which excludes lakes, ponds, glaciers > 1 km^{2} (0.386 sq mi or 247 acres) and river estuaries.

La Grimaudière (French pronunciation: [la ɡʁimodjɛʁ]) is a commune in the Vienne department in the Nouvelle-Aquitaine region in western France.

== Demographics ==
Historical population
Year	Pop.	±% p.a.
1968	547	—
1975	480	−1.85%
1982	467	−0.39%
1990	459	−0.22%
1999	402	−1.46%
2007	392	−0.31%
2012	377	−0.78%
2017	397	+1.04%
2023	392	−0.21%
Source: INSEE

== See also ==
- Communes of the Vienne department
