= Bournand =

- Commune
- Location of Bournand
- Location within France Location within Nouvelle-Aquitaine
- Coordinates: 47°05′16″N 0°04′45″E
- Country: France
- Region: Nouvelle-Aquitaine
- Department: Vienne
- Arrondissement: Châtellerault
- Canton: Loudun
- Intercommunality: Pays Loudunais

Government
  - Mayor (2020–2026): Patricia Champigny
- Area^{1}: 32.42 km^{2} (12.52 sq mi)
- Elevation: 52 m (171 ft)
- Highest elevation: 108 m (354 ft)
- Lowest elevation: 37 m (121 ft)
- Population (2023): 914
  - Density: 28.2/km^{2} (73.0/sq mi)
- Time zone: UTC+01:00 (CET)
  - Summer (DST): UTC+02:00 (CEST)
- INSEE/Postal code: 86036 /86120
- ^{1} French Land Register data, which excludes lakes, ponds, glaciers > 1 km^{2} (0.386 sq mi or 247 acres) and river estuaries.

Bournand (French pronunciation: [buʁnɑ̃]) is a commune in the Vienne department in the Nouvelle-Aquitaine region in western France.

== Demographics ==
Historical population
Year	Pop.	±% p.a.
1968	730	—
1975	670	−1.22%
1982	633	−0.81%
1990	645	+0.24%
1999	641	−0.07%
2007	647	+0.12%
2012	750	+3.00%
2017	878	+3.20%
2023	914	+0.67%
Source: INSEE

== See also ==
- Communes of the Vienne department
