= Saint-Christophe, Vienne =

Saint-Christophe
- Commune
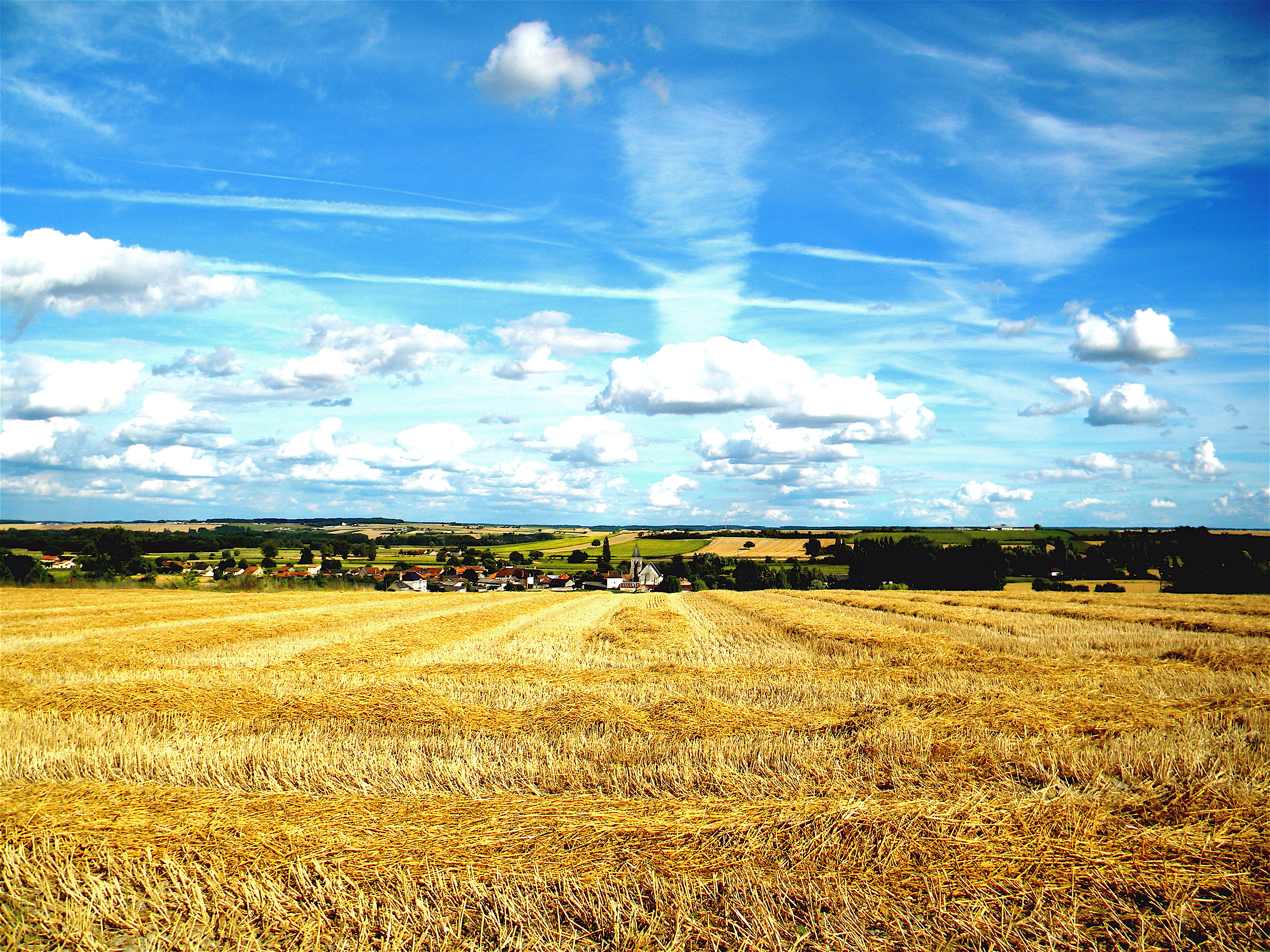
- A general view of Saint-Christophe
- Location of Saint-Christophe
- Location within France Location within Nouvelle-Aquitaine
- Coordinates: 46°55′18″N 0°22′24″E
- Country: France
- Region: Nouvelle-Aquitaine
- Department: Vienne
- Arrondissement: Châtellerault
- Canton: Châtellerault-2
- Intercommunality: CA Grand Châtellerault

Government
  - Mayor (2020–2026): Thierry Prieur
- Area^{1}: 15.2 km^{2} (5.9 sq mi)
- Elevation: 85 m (279 ft)
- Highest elevation: 140 m (460 ft)
- Lowest elevation: 69 m (226 ft)
- Population (2023): 279
  - Density: 18.4/km^{2} (47.5/sq mi)
- Time zone: UTC+01:00 (CET)
  - Summer (DST): UTC+02:00 (CEST)
- INSEE/Postal code: 86217 /86230
- ^{1} French Land Register data, which excludes lakes, ponds, glaciers > 1 km^{2} (0.386 sq mi or 247 acres) and river estuaries.

Saint-Christophe (French pronunciation: [sɛ̃ kʁistɔf]) is a commune in the Vienne department in the Nouvelle-Aquitaine region in western France.

== Demographics ==
Historical population
Year	Pop.	±% p.a.
1968	368	—
1975	363	−0.20%
1982	311	−2.18%
1990	276	−1.48%
1999	303	+1.04%
2007	347	+1.71%
2012	337	−0.58%
2017	302	−2.17%
2023	279	−1.31%
Source: INSEE

== See also ==
- Communes of the Vienne department
