= Saint-Léger-de-Montbrillais =

- Commune
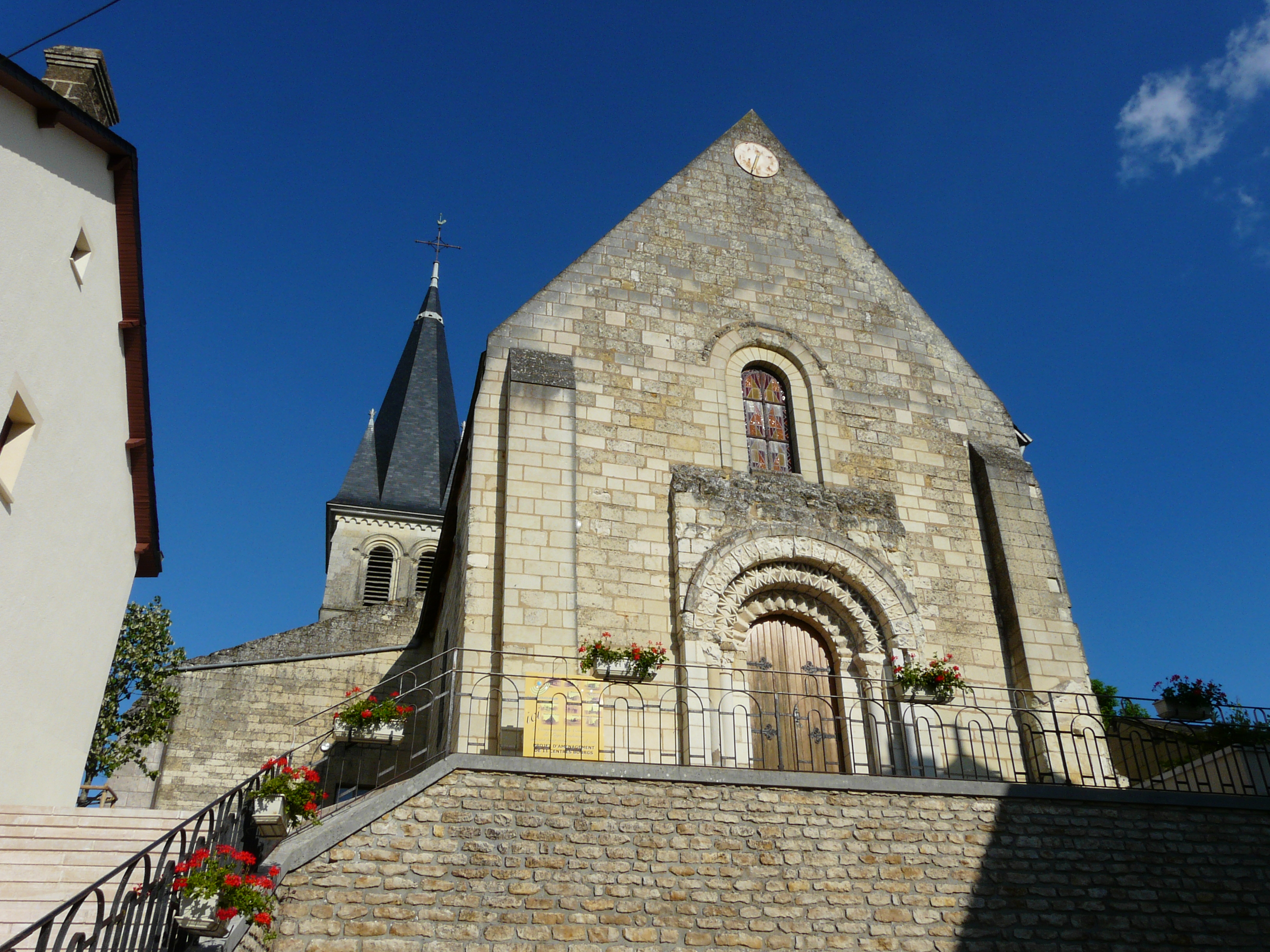
- The church in Saint-Léger-de-Montbrillais
- Location of Saint-Léger-de-Montbrillais
- Location within France Location within Nouvelle-Aquitaine
- Coordinates: 47°04′20″N 0°02′34″W
- Country: France
- Region: Nouvelle-Aquitaine
- Department: Vienne
- Arrondissement: Châtellerault
- Canton: Loudun
- Intercommunality: Pays Loudunais

Government
  - Mayor (2020–2026): Philippe Batty
- Area^{1}: 10.4 km^{2} (4.0 sq mi)
- Elevation: 97 m (318 ft)
- Highest elevation: 115 m (377 ft)
- Lowest elevation: 39 m (128 ft)
- Population (2023): 354
  - Density: 34.0/km^{2} (88.2/sq mi)
- Time zone: UTC+01:00 (CET)
  - Summer (DST): UTC+02:00 (CEST)
- INSEE/Postal code: 86229 /86120
- ^{1} French Land Register data, which excludes lakes, ponds, glaciers > 1 km^{2} (0.386 sq mi or 247 acres) and river estuaries.

Saint-Léger-de-Montbrillais (French pronunciation: [sɛ̃ leʒe də mɔ̃bʁijɛ]) is a commune in the Vienne department in the Nouvelle-Aquitaine region in western France.

== Demographics ==
Historical population
Year	Pop.	±% p.a.
1968	534	—
1975	444	−2.60%
1982	420	−0.79%
1990	427	+0.21%
1999	405	−0.59%
2007	387	−0.57%
2012	377	−0.52%
2017	349	−1.53%
2023	354	+0.24%
Source: INSEE

== See also ==
- Communes of the Vienne department
