= Arrondissement of Châtellerault =

Coordinates: 46°49′N 0°32′E

Châtellerault
- Arrondissement
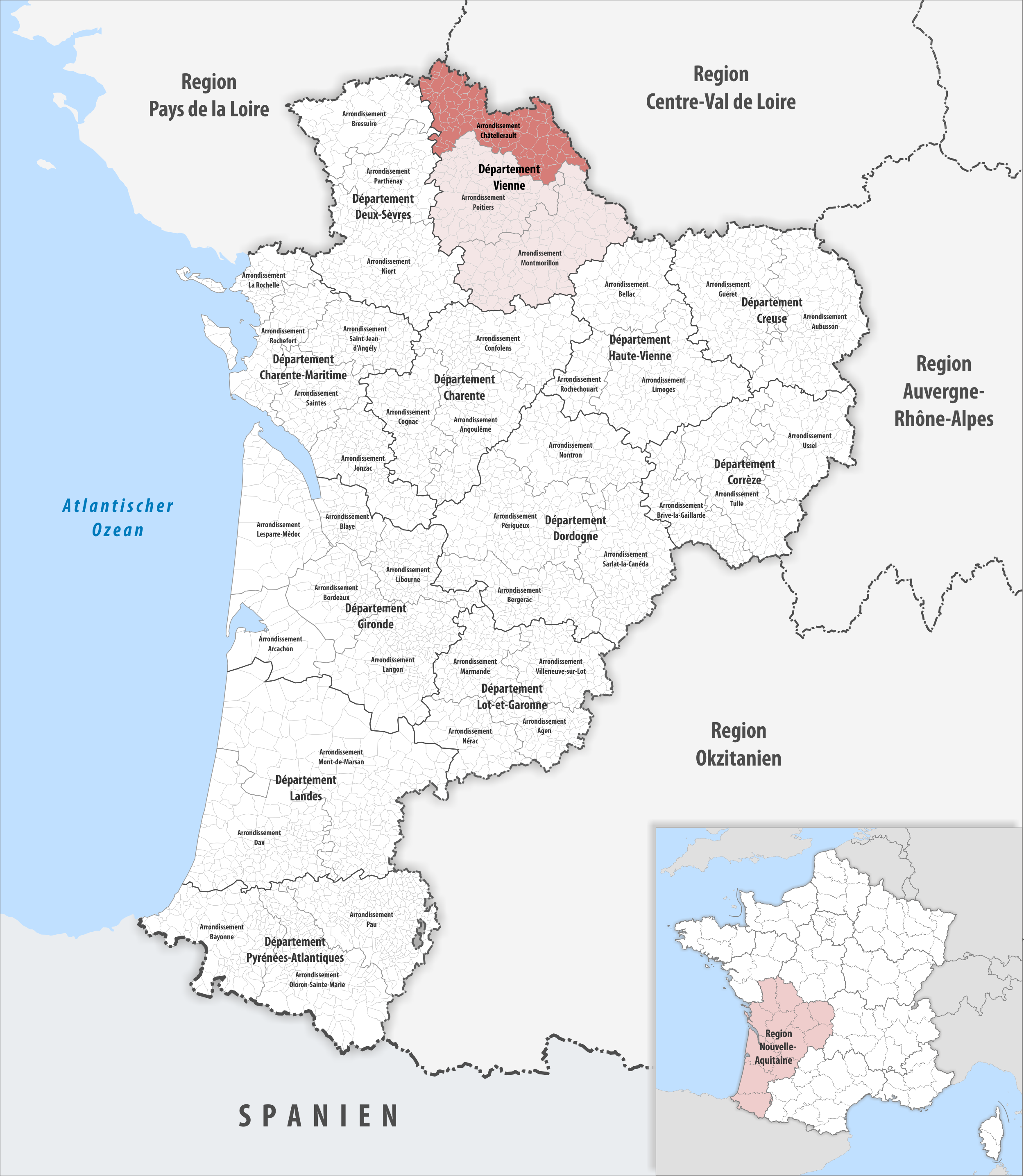
- Location within the region Nouvelle-Aquitaine
- Country: France
- Region: Nouvelle-Aquitaine
- Department: Vienne
- No. of communes: {{{nbcomm}}}
- Area: 1,982.9 km^{2} (765.6 sq mi)
- Population (2023): 107,054
  - Density: 53.989/km^{2} (139.83/sq mi)
- INSEE code: 861

The arrondissement of Châtellerault is an arrondissement of France in the Vienne department in the Nouvelle-Aquitaine region. It has 92 communes. Its population is 107,469 (2021), and its area is 1,982.9 km^{2} (765.6 sq mi).

== Composition ==
The communes of the arrondissement of Châtellerault, and their INSEE codes, are:

1. Angles-sur-l'Anglin (86004)
2. Angliers (86005)
3. Antran (86007)
4. Arçay (86008)
5. Archigny (86009)
6. Aulnay (86013)
7. Availles-en-Châtellerault (86014)
8. Basses (86018)
9. Bellefonds (86020)
10. Berrie (86022)
11. Berthegon (86023)
12. Beuxes (86026)
13. Bonneuil-Matours (86032)
14. Bournand (86036)
15. Buxeuil (86042)
16. Ceaux-en-Loudun (86044)
17. Cenon-sur-Vienne (86046)
18. Cernay (86047)
19. Chalais (86049)
20. Châtellerault (86066)
21. La Chaussée (86069)
22. Chenevelles (86072)
23. Colombiers (86081)
24. Coussay-les-Bois (86086)
25. Craon (86087)
26. Curçay-sur-Dive (86090)
27. Dangé-Saint-Romain (86092)
28. Dercé (86093)
29. Doussay (86096)
30. Glénouze (86106)
31. La Grimaudière (86108)
32. Guesnes (86109)
33. Ingrandes (86111)
34. Leigné-les-Bois (86125)
35. Leigné-sur-Usseau (86127)
36. Lencloître (86128)
37. Lésigny (86129)
38. Leugny (86130)
39. Loudun (86137)
40. Mairé (86143)
41. Martaizé (86149)
42. Maulay (86151)
43. Mazeuil (86154)
44. Messemé (86156)
45. Moncontour (86161)
46. Mondion (86162)
47. Monthoiron (86164)
48. Monts-sur-Guesnes (86167)
49. Morton (86169)
50. Mouterre-Silly (86173)
51. Naintré (86174)
52. Nueil-sous-Faye (86181)
53. Orches (86182)
54. Les Ormes (86183)
55. Ouzilly (86184)
56. Oyré (86186)
57. Pleumartin (86193)
58. Port-de-Piles (86195)
59. Pouançay (86196)
60. Pouant (86197)
61. Prinçay (86201)
62. Ranton (86205)
63. Raslay (86206)
64. La Roche-Posay (86207)
65. La Roche-Rigault (86079)
66. Roiffé (86210)
67. Saint-Christophe (86217)
68. Saint-Clair (86218)
69. Saint-Genest-d'Ambière (86221)
70. Saint-Gervais-les-Trois-Clochers (86224)
71. Saint-Jean-de-Sauves (86225)
72. Saint-Laon (86227)
73. Saint-Léger-de-Montbrillais (86229)
74. Saint-Rémy-sur-Creuse (86241)
75. Saires (86249)
76. Saix (86250)
77. Sammarçolles (86252)
78. Savigny-sous-Faye (86257)
79. Scorbé-Clairvaux (86258)
80. Senillé-Saint-Sauveur (86245)
81. Sérigny (86260)
82. Sossais (86265)
83. Ternay (86269)
84. Thuré (86272)
85. Les Trois-Moutiers (86274)
86. Usseau (86275)
87. Vaux-sur-Vienne (86279)
88. Vellèches (86280)
89. Verrue (86286)
90. Vézières (86287)
91. Vicq-sur-Gartempe (86288)
92. Vouneuil-sur-Vienne (86298)

== History ==
The arrondissement of Châtellerault was created in 1800. At the January 2017 reorganisation of the arrondissements of Vienne, it received one commune from the arrondissement of Montmorillon, and it lost four communes to the arrondissement of Poitiers.

As a result of the reorganisation of the cantons of France which came into effect in 2015, the borders of the cantons are no longer related to the borders of the arrondissements. The cantons of the arrondissement of Châtellerault were, as of January 2015:

1. Châtellerault-Nord
2. Châtellerault-Ouest
3. Châtellerault-Sud
4. Dangé-Saint-Romain
5. Lencloître
6. Loudun
7. Moncontour
8. Monts-sur-Guesnes
9. Pleumartin
10. Saint-Gervais-les-Trois-Clochers
11. Les Trois-Moutiers
12. Vouneuil-sur-Vienne
