= Saint-Rémy-sur-Creuse =

- Commune
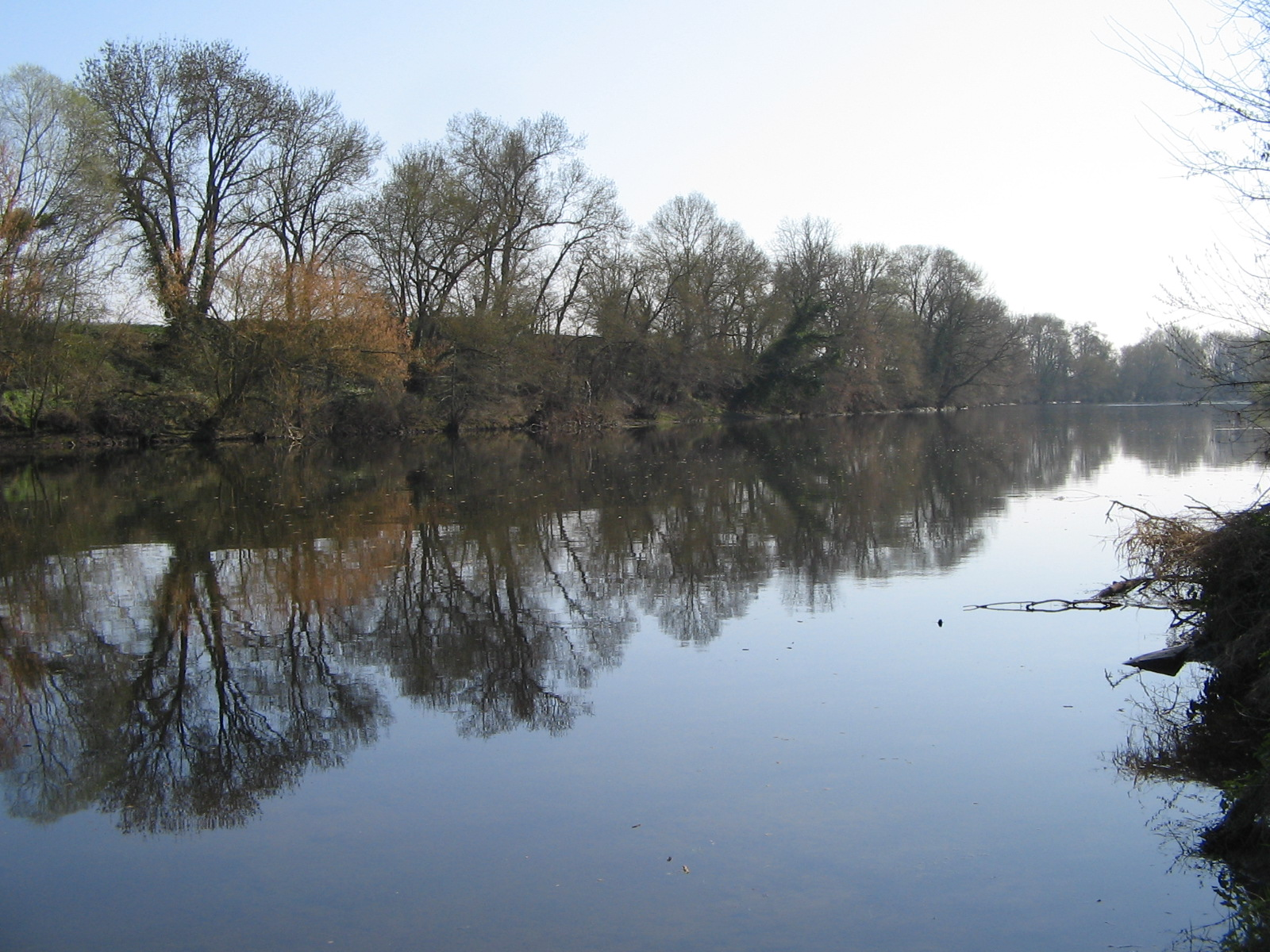
- The Creuse river at Saint-Rémy-sur-Creuse

- Coat of arms
- Location of Saint-Rémy-sur-Creuse
- Location within France Location within Nouvelle-Aquitaine
- Coordinates: 46°57′15″N 0°41′44″E
- Country: France
- Region: Nouvelle-Aquitaine
- Department: Vienne
- Arrondissement: Châtellerault
- Canton: Châtellerault-2
- Intercommunality: CA Grand Châtellerault

Government
  - Mayor (2020–2026): Monique Conte
- Area^{1}: 12.94 km^{2} (5.00 sq mi)
- Elevation: 95 m (312 ft)
- Highest elevation: 123 m (404 ft)
- Lowest elevation: 43 m (141 ft)
- Population (2023): 462
  - Density: 35.7/km^{2} (92.5/sq mi)
- Time zone: UTC+01:00 (CET)
  - Summer (DST): UTC+02:00 (CEST)
- INSEE/Postal code: 86241 /86220
- ^{1} French Land Register data, which excludes lakes, ponds, glaciers > 1 km^{2} (0.386 sq mi or 247 acres) and river estuaries.

Saint-Rémy-sur-Creuse (French pronunciation: [sɛ̃ ʁemi syʁ kʁøz], literally Saint-Rémy on Creuse) is a commune in the Vienne department in the Nouvelle-Aquitaine region in western France.

== Demographics ==
Historical population
Year	Pop.	±% p.a.
1968	528	—
1975	557	+0.77%
1982	503	−1.45%
1990	504	+0.02%
1999	422	−1.95%
2007	405	−0.51%
2012	403	−0.10%
2017	392	−0.55%
2023	462	+2.78%
Source: INSEE

== See also ==
- Communes of the Vienne department
