= Antran =

- Commune
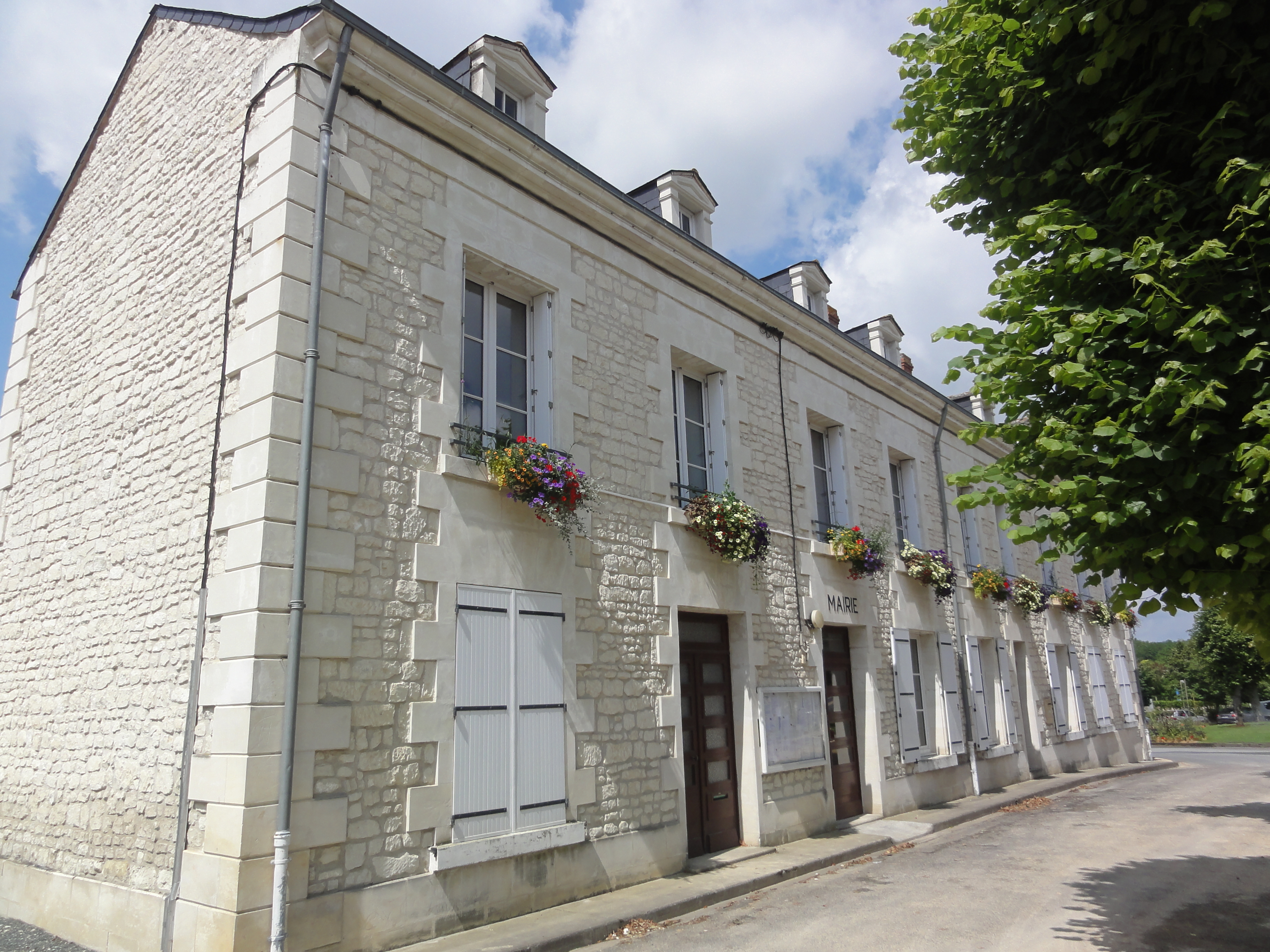
- The town hall in Antran
- Location of Antran
- Location within France Location within Nouvelle-Aquitaine
- Coordinates: 46°51′12″N 0°32′39″E
- Country: France
- Region: Nouvelle-Aquitaine
- Department: Vienne
- Arrondissement: Châtellerault
- Canton: Châtellerault-2
- Intercommunality: CA Grand Châtellerault

Government
  - Mayor (2020–2026): Elodie Sivault
- Area^{1}: 23.82 km^{2} (9.20 sq mi)
- Elevation: 49 m (161 ft)
- Highest elevation: 158 m (518 ft)
- Lowest elevation: 37 m (121 ft)
- Population (2023): 1,148
  - Density: 48.19/km^{2} (124.8/sq mi)
- Time zone: UTC+01:00 (CET)
  - Summer (DST): UTC+02:00 (CEST)
- INSEE/Postal code: 86007 /86100
- ^{1} French Land Register data, which excludes lakes, ponds, glaciers > 1 km^{2} (0.386 sq mi or 247 acres) and river estuaries.

Antran (French pronunciation: [ɑ̃tʁɑ̃]) is a commune in the Vienne department in the Nouvelle-Aquitaine region in western France.

== Demography ==
Historical population
Year	Pop.	±% p.a.
1968	648	—
1975	761	+2.32%
1982	1,023	+4.32%
1990	978	−0.56%
1999	1,060	+0.90%
2007	1,118	+0.67%
2012	1,170	+0.91%
2017	1,192	+0.37%
2023	1,148	−0.62%
Source: INSEE

== See also ==
- Communes of the Vienne department
