= Sammarçolles =

- Commune
- Location of Sammarçolles
- Location within France Location within Nouvelle-Aquitaine
- Coordinates: 47°02′01″N 0°08′50″E
- Country: France
- Region: Nouvelle-Aquitaine
- Department: Vienne
- Arrondissement: Châtellerault
- Canton: Loudun
- Intercommunality: Pays Loudunais

Government
  - Mayor (2020–2026): Lysiane Berton
- Area^{1}: 21.22 km^{2} (8.19 sq mi)
- Elevation: 74 m (243 ft)
- Highest elevation: 102 m (335 ft)
- Lowest elevation: 54 m (177 ft)
- Population (2023): 648
  - Density: 30.5/km^{2} (79.1/sq mi)
- Time zone: UTC+01:00 (CET)
  - Summer (DST): UTC+02:00 (CEST)
- INSEE/Postal code: 86252 /86200
- ^{1} French Land Register data, which excludes lakes, ponds, glaciers > 1 km^{2} (0.386 sq mi or 247 acres) and river estuaries.

Sammarçolles (French pronunciation: [samaʁsɔl]) is a commune in Vienne, Nouvelle-Aquitaine, France. The small town lies northeast of Loudun, 6.5 kilometres by road. It contains a "rich chapel", built by the Montault des Isles family.

== Demographics ==
686 inhabitants were recorded in 1886. The population declined in the 20th century to a low of 472 people in 1990, after which the population increased again.

Historical population
| Year | Pop. | ±% p.a. |
|---|---|---|
| 1968 | 594 | — |
| 1975 | 559 | −0.86% |
| 1982 | 513 | −1.22% |
| 1990 | 472 | −1.04% |
| 1999 | 513 | +0.93% |
| 2007 | 601 | +2.00% |
| 2012 | 643 | +1.36% |
| 2017 | 642 | −0.03% |
| 2023 | 648 | +0.16% |
Source: INSEE

== See also ==
- Communes of the Vienne department
