= Sérigny, Vienne =

Sérigny
- Commune
- Location of Sérigny
- Location within France Location within Nouvelle-Aquitaine
- Coordinates: 46°54′24″N 0°21′01″E
- Country: France
- Region: Nouvelle-Aquitaine
- Department: Vienne
- Arrondissement: Châtellerault
- Canton: Châtellerault-2
- Intercommunality: CA Grand Châtellerault

Government
  - Mayor (2020–2026): Marc Chaineau
- Area^{1}: 24.92 km^{2} (9.62 sq mi)
- Elevation: 130 m (430 ft)
- Highest elevation: 162 m (531 ft)
- Lowest elevation: 56 m (184 ft)
- Population (2023): 315
  - Density: 12.6/km^{2} (32.7/sq mi)
- Time zone: UTC+01:00 (CET)
  - Summer (DST): UTC+02:00 (CEST)
- INSEE/Postal code: 86260 /86230
- ^{1} French Land Register data, which excludes lakes, ponds, glaciers > 1 km^{2} (0.386 sq mi or 247 acres) and river estuaries.

Sérigny (French pronunciation: [seʁiɲi]) is a commune in the Vienne department in the Nouvelle-Aquitaine region in western France.

== Demographics ==
Historical population
| Year | Pop. | ±% p.a. |
|---|---|---|
| 1968 | 550 | — |
| 1975 | 448 | −2.89% |
| 1982 | 394 | −1.82% |
| 1990 | 339 | −1.86% |
| 1999 | 342 | +0.10% |
| 2007 | 297 | −1.75% |
| 2012 | 309 | +0.80% |
| 2017 | 312 | +0.19% |
| 2023 | 315 | +0.16% |
Source: INSEE

== See also ==
- Communes of the Vienne department
