= Doussay =

- Commune
- Location of Doussay
- Location within France Location within Nouvelle-Aquitaine
- Coordinates: 46°50′41″N 0°16′35″E
- Country: France
- Region: Nouvelle-Aquitaine
- Department: Vienne
- Arrondissement: Châtellerault
- Canton: Loudun
- Intercommunality: CA Grand Châtellerault

Government
  - Mayor (2020–2026): Philippe Bigot
- Area^{1}: 27.1 km^{2} (10.5 sq mi)
- Elevation: 83 m (272 ft)
- Highest elevation: 141 m (463 ft)
- Lowest elevation: 70 m (230 ft)
- Population (2023): 690
  - Density: 25/km^{2} (66/sq mi)
- Time zone: UTC+01:00 (CET)
  - Summer (DST): UTC+02:00 (CEST)
- INSEE/Postal code: 86096 /86140
- ^{1} French Land Register data, which excludes lakes, ponds, glaciers > 1 km^{2} (0.386 sq mi or 247 acres) and river estuaries.

Doussay (French pronunciation: [dusɛ]) is a commune in the Vienne department in the Nouvelle-Aquitaine region in western France.

== Demographics ==
Historical population
Year	Pop.	±% p.a.
1968	649	—
1975	603	−1.04%
1982	574	−0.70%
1990	565	−0.20%
1999	537	−0.56%
2007	598	+1.35%
2012	659	+1.96%
2017	653	−0.18%
2023	690	+0.92%
Source: INSEE

== See also ==
- Communes of the Vienne department
