= Glénouze =

- Commune
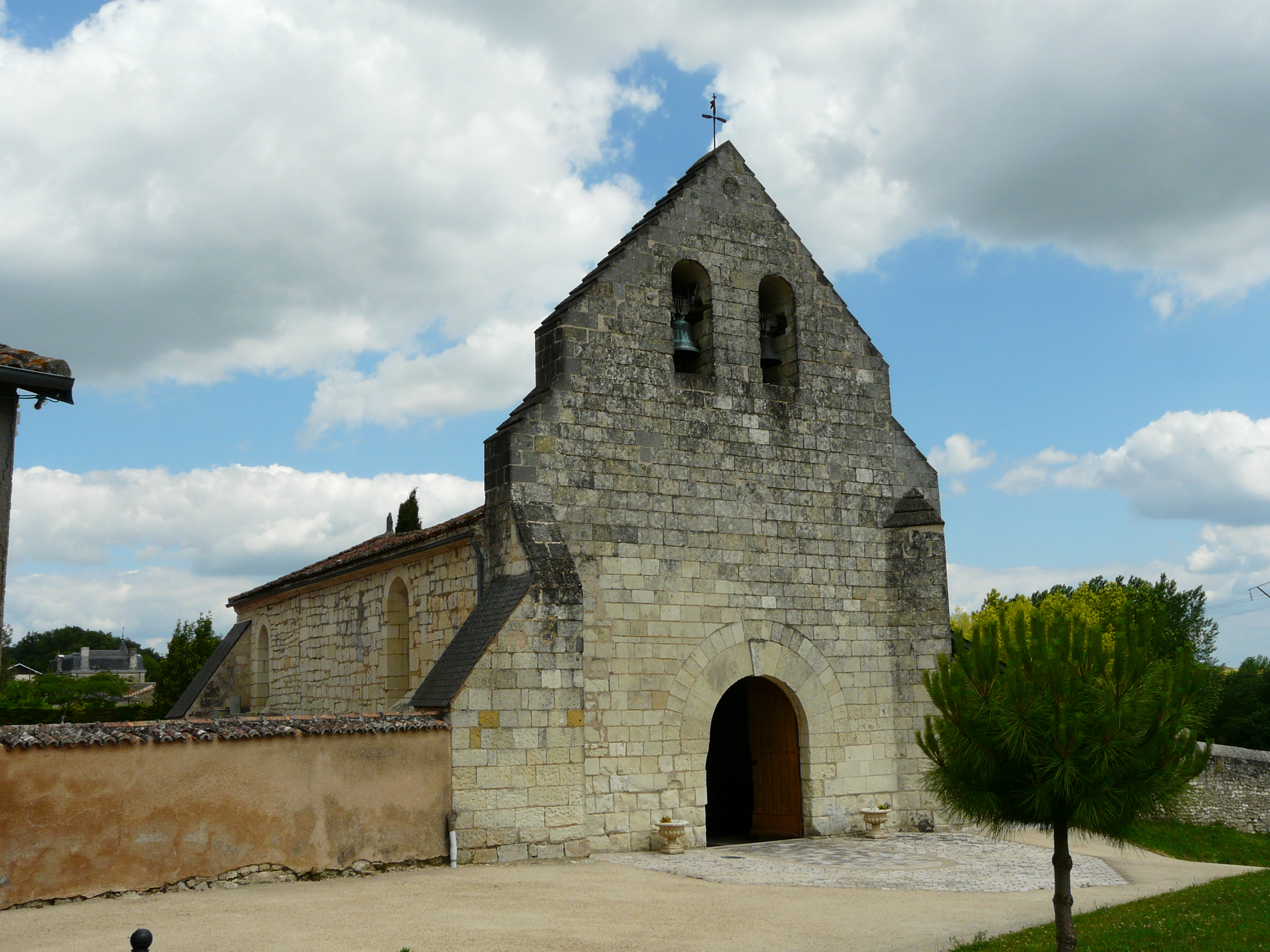
- The church in Glénouze
- Location of Glénouze
- Location within France Location within Nouvelle-Aquitaine
- Coordinates: 46°59′50″N 0°00′26″W
- Country: France
- Region: Nouvelle-Aquitaine
- Department: Vienne
- Arrondissement: Châtellerault
- Canton: Loudun
- Intercommunality: Pays Loudunais

Government
  - Mayor (2020–2026): Quentin Sigonneau
- Area^{1}: 9.65 km^{2} (3.73 sq mi)
- Elevation: 128 m (420 ft)
- Highest elevation: 123 m (404 ft)
- Lowest elevation: 50 m (160 ft)
- Population (2023): 106
  - Density: 11.0/km^{2} (28.4/sq mi)
- Time zone: UTC+01:00 (CET)
  - Summer (DST): UTC+02:00 (CEST)
- INSEE/Postal code: 86106 /86200
- ^{1} French Land Register data, which excludes lakes, ponds, glaciers > 1 km^{2} (0.386 sq mi or 247 acres) and river estuaries.

Glénouze (French pronunciation: [ɡlenuz]) is a commune in the Vienne department in the Nouvelle-Aquitaine region in western France.

== Demographics ==
Historical population
Year	Pop.	±% p.a.
1968	175	—
1975	129	−4.26%
1982	128	−0.11%
1990	114	−1.44%
1999	110	−0.40%
2007	113	+0.34%
2012	115	+0.35%
2017	105	−1.80%
2023	106	+0.16%
Source: INSEE

== See also ==
- Communes of the Vienne department
