= Vaux-sur-Vienne =

- Commune
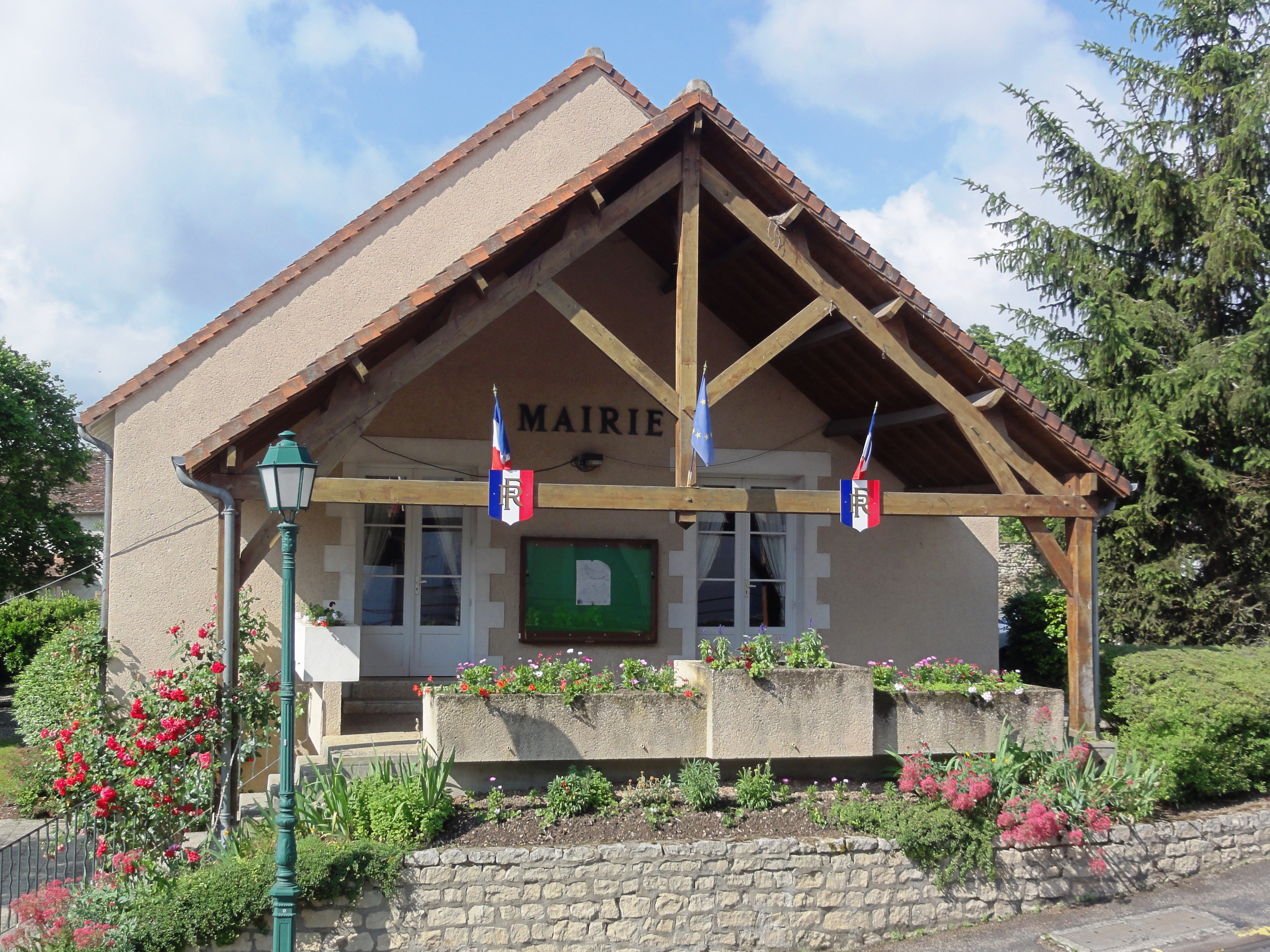
- The town hall in Vaux-sur-Vienne
- Location of Vaux-sur-Vienne
- Location within France Location within Nouvelle-Aquitaine
- Coordinates: 46°54′48″N 0°33′45″E
- Country: France
- Region: Nouvelle-Aquitaine
- Department: Vienne
- Arrondissement: Châtellerault
- Canton: Châtellerault-2
- Intercommunality: CA Grand Châtellerault

Government
  - Mayor (2020–2026): Philippe Foucteau
- Area^{1}: 7 km^{2} (2.7 sq mi)
- Elevation: 300 m (980 ft)
- Highest elevation: 125 m (410 ft)
- Lowest elevation: 37 m (121 ft)
- Population (2023): 538
  - Density: 77/km^{2} (200/sq mi)
- Time zone: UTC+01:00 (CET)
  - Summer (DST): UTC+02:00 (CEST)
- INSEE/Postal code: 86279 /86220
- ^{1} French Land Register data, which excludes lakes, ponds, glaciers > 1 km^{2} (0.386 sq mi or 247 acres) and river estuaries.

Vaux-sur-Vienne (French pronunciation: [vo syʁ vjɛn]) is a commune in the Vienne department in the Nouvelle-Aquitaine region in western France.

== Demographics ==
Historical population
Year	Pop.	±% p.a.
1968	270	—
1975	336	+3.17%
1982	467	+4.82%
1990	556	+2.20%
1999	579	+0.45%
2007	590	+0.24%
2012	602	+0.40%
2017	546	−1.93%
2023	538	−0.25%
Source: INSEE

== See also ==
- Communes of the Vienne department
