= Basses, Vienne =

Basses
- Commune
- Location of Basses
- Location within France Location within Nouvelle-Aquitaine
- Coordinates: 47°02′17″N 0°07′09″E
- Country: France
- Region: Nouvelle-Aquitaine
- Department: Vienne
- Arrondissement: Châtellerault
- Canton: Loudun
- Intercommunality: Pays Loudunais

Government
  - Mayor (2020–2026): Monique Vivion
- Area^{1}: 10.25 km^{2} (3.96 sq mi)
- Elevation: 79 m (259 ft)
- Highest elevation: 97 m (318 ft)
- Lowest elevation: 63 m (207 ft)
- Population (2023): 344
  - Density: 33.6/km^{2} (86.9/sq mi)
- Time zone: UTC+01:00 (CET)
  - Summer (DST): UTC+02:00 (CEST)
- INSEE/Postal code: 86018 /86200
- ^{1} French Land Register data, which excludes lakes, ponds, glaciers > 1 km^{2} (0.386 sq mi or 247 acres) and river estuaries.

Basses (French pronunciation: [bas]) is a commune in the Vienne department in the Nouvelle-Aquitaine region in western France.

== See also ==
- Communes of the Vienne department
