= Raslay =

- Commune
- Location of Raslay
- Location within France Location within Nouvelle-Aquitaine
- Coordinates: 47°06′47″N 0°00′05″W
- Country: France
- Region: Nouvelle-Aquitaine
- Department: Vienne
- Arrondissement: Châtellerault
- Canton: Loudun
- Intercommunality: Pays Loudunais

Government
  - Mayor (2020–2026): Michel Servain
- Area^{1}: 3.98 km^{2} (1.54 sq mi)
- Elevation: 41 m (135 ft)
- Highest elevation: 51 m (167 ft)
- Lowest elevation: 32 m (105 ft)
- Population (2023): 134
  - Density: 33.7/km^{2} (87.2/sq mi)
- Time zone: UTC+01:00 (CET)
  - Summer (DST): UTC+02:00 (CEST)
- INSEE/Postal code: 86206 /86120
- ^{1} French Land Register data, which excludes lakes, ponds, glaciers > 1 km^{2} (0.386 sq mi or 247 acres) and river estuaries.

Raslay (French pronunciation: [ʁalɛ]) is a commune in the Vienne department in the Nouvelle-Aquitaine region in western France.

== Demographics ==
Historical population
Year	Pop.	±% p.a.
1968	134	—
1975	138	+0.42%
1982	116	−2.45%
1990	125	+0.94%
1999	133	+0.69%
2007	111	−2.23%
2012	124	+2.24%
2017	132	+1.26%
2023	134	+0.25%
Source: INSEE

== See also ==
- Communes of the Vienne department
