= Savigny-sous-Faye =

- Commune
- Location of Savigny-sous-Faye
- Location within France Location within Nouvelle-Aquitaine
- Coordinates: 46°52′16″N 0°17′12″E
- Country: France
- Region: Nouvelle-Aquitaine
- Department: Vienne
- Arrondissement: Châtellerault
- Canton: Châtellerault-2
- Intercommunality: CA Grand Châtellerault

Government
  - Mayor (2020–2026): Martine Godet
- Area^{1}: 15 km^{2} (5.8 sq mi)
- Elevation: 120 m (390 ft)
- Highest elevation: 149 m (489 ft)
- Lowest elevation: 75 m (246 ft)
- Population (2023): 379
  - Density: 25/km^{2} (65/sq mi)
- Time zone: UTC+01:00 (CET)
  - Summer (DST): UTC+02:00 (CEST)
- INSEE/Postal code: 86257 /86140
- ^{1} French Land Register data, which excludes lakes, ponds, glaciers > 1 km^{2} (0.386 sq mi or 247 acres) and river estuaries.

Savigny-sous-Faye (French pronunciation: [saviɲi su fɛ]) is a commune in the Vienne department in the Nouvelle-Aquitaine region in western France.

== Demographics ==
Historical population
Year	Pop.	±% p.a.
1968	411	—
1975	356	−2.03%
1982	282	−3.27%
1990	283	+0.04%
1999	298	+0.58%
2007	327	+1.17%
2012	362	+2.05%
2017	383	+1.13%
2023	379	−0.17%
Source: INSEE

== See also ==
- Communes of the Vienne department
