= Saires =

- Commune
- Location of Saires
- Location within France Location within Nouvelle-Aquitaine
- Coordinates: 46°53′08″N 0°14′39″E
- Country: France
- Region: Nouvelle-Aquitaine
- Department: Vienne
- Arrondissement: Châtellerault
- Canton: Loudun
- Intercommunality: Pays Loudunais

Government
  - Mayor (2020–2026): Joël Combreau
- Area^{1}: 14.05 km^{2} (5.42 sq mi)
- Elevation: 98 m (322 ft)
- Highest elevation: 147 m (482 ft)
- Lowest elevation: 72 m (236 ft)
- Population (2023): 122
  - Density: 8.68/km^{2} (22.5/sq mi)
- Time zone: UTC+01:00 (CET)
  - Summer (DST): UTC+02:00 (CEST)
- INSEE/Postal code: 86249 /86420
- ^{1} French Land Register data, which excludes lakes, ponds, glaciers > 1 km^{2} (0.386 sq mi or 247 acres) and river estuaries.

Saires (French pronunciation: [sɛʁ]) is a commune in the Vienne department in the Nouvelle-Aquitaine region in western France.

== Demographics ==
Historical population
Year	Pop.	±% p.a.
1968	217	—
1975	167	−3.67%
1982	135	−2.99%
1990	134	−0.09%
1999	128	−0.51%
2007	147	+1.75%
2012	140	−0.97%
2017	132	−1.17%
2023	122	−1.30%
Source: INSEE

== See also ==
- Communes of the Vienne department
