= Canton of Châtellerault-2 =

Coordinates: 46.82°N 0.53°E

The canton of Châtellerault-2 is an administrative division of the Vienne department, western France. It was created at the French canton reorganisation which came into effect in March 2015. Its seat is in Châtellerault.

It consists of the following communes:

1. Antran
2. Buxeuil
3. Châtellerault (partly)
4. Dangé-Saint-Romain
5. Ingrandes
6. Leigné-sur-Usseau
7. Leugny
8. Mondion
9. Orches
10. Les Ormes
11. Oyré
12. Port-de-Piles
13. Saint-Christophe
14. Saint-Gervais-les-Trois-Clochers
15. Saint-Rémy-sur-Creuse
16. Savigny-sous-Faye
17. Sérigny
18. Sossais
19. Usseau
20. Vaux-sur-Vienne
21. Vellèches
