= Vellèches =

- Commune
- Location of Vellèches
- Location within France Location within Nouvelle-Aquitaine
- Coordinates: 46°56′35″N 0°31′59″E
- Country: France
- Region: Nouvelle-Aquitaine
- Department: Vienne
- Arrondissement: Châtellerault
- Canton: Châtellerault-2
- Intercommunality: CA Grand Châtellerault

Government
  - Mayor (2022–2026): Thierry Daulard
- Area^{1}: 19.64 km^{2} (7.58 sq mi)
- Elevation: 80 m (260 ft)
- Highest elevation: 135 m (443 ft)
- Lowest elevation: 58 m (190 ft)
- Population (2023): 347
  - Density: 17.7/km^{2} (45.8/sq mi)
- Time zone: UTC+01:00 (CET)
  - Summer (DST): UTC+02:00 (CEST)
- INSEE/Postal code: 86280 /86230
- ^{1} French Land Register data, which excludes lakes, ponds, glaciers > 1 km^{2} (0.386 sq mi or 247 acres) and river estuaries.

Vellèches (French pronunciation: [velɛʃ]) is a commune in the Vienne department in the Nouvelle-Aquitaine region in western France.

== Demographics ==
Historical population
Year	Pop.	±% p.a.
1968	491	—
1975	405	−2.71%
1982	387	−0.65%
1990	350	−1.25%
1999	358	+0.25%
2007	371	+0.45%
2012	402	+1.62%
2017	363	−2.02%
2023	347	−0.75%
Source: INSEE

== See also ==
- Communes of the Vienne department
