= Leugny, Vienne =

Leugny
- Commune
- Location of Leugny
- Location within France Location within Nouvelle-Aquitaine
- Coordinates: 46°54′47″N 0°42′07″E
- Country: France
- Region: Nouvelle-Aquitaine
- Department: Vienne
- Arrondissement: Châtellerault
- Canton: Châtellerault-2
- Intercommunality: CA Grand Châtellerault

Government
  - Mayor (2021–2026): Serge Migeon
- Area^{1}: 15.74 km^{2} (6.08 sq mi)
- Elevation: 100 m (330 ft)
- Highest elevation: 144 m (472 ft)
- Lowest elevation: 43 m (141 ft)
- Population (2023): 362
  - Density: 23.0/km^{2} (59.6/sq mi)
- Time zone: UTC+01:00 (CET)
  - Summer (DST): UTC+02:00 (CEST)
- INSEE/Postal code: 86130 /86220
- ^{1} French Land Register data, which excludes lakes, ponds, glaciers > 1 km^{2} (0.386 sq mi or 247 acres) and river estuaries.

Leugny (French pronunciation: [lœɲi]) is a commune in the Vienne department in the Nouvelle-Aquitaine region in western France.

== Demographics ==
Historical population
Year	Pop.	±% p.a.
1968	326	—
1975	311	−0.67%
1982	357	+1.99%
1990	362	+0.17%
1999	398	+1.06%
2007	438	+1.20%
2012	446	+0.36%
2017	407	−1.81%
2023	362	−1.93%
Source: INSEE

== See also ==
- Communes of the Vienne department
