= Arçay, Vienne =

Arçay
- Commune
- Location of Arçay
- Location within France Location within Nouvelle-Aquitaine
- Coordinates: 46°58′10″N 0°00′54″E
- Country: France
- Region: Nouvelle-Aquitaine
- Department: Vienne
- Arrondissement: Châtellerault
- Canton: Loudun
- Intercommunality: Pays Loudunais

Government
  - Mayor (2020–2026): Alain Noe
- Area^{1}: 14.05 km^{2} (5.42 sq mi)
- Elevation: 78 m (256 ft)
- Highest elevation: 122 m (400 ft)
- Lowest elevation: 50 m (160 ft)
- Population (2023): 343
  - Density: 24.4/km^{2} (63.2/sq mi)
- Time zone: UTC+01:00 (CET)
  - Summer (DST): UTC+02:00 (CEST)
- INSEE/Postal code: 86008 /86200
- ^{1} French Land Register data, which excludes lakes, ponds, glaciers > 1 km^{2} (0.386 sq mi or 247 acres) and river estuaries.

Arçay (French pronunciation: [aʁsɛ]) is a commune in the Vienne department in the Nouvelle-Aquitaine region in western France. The inhabitants are called Arçois.

== See also ==
- Communes of the Vienne department
