= Communauté d'agglomération Grand Châtellerault =

Grand Châtellerault
- Communauté d'agglomération
- Interactive map of Grand Châtellerault
- Coordinates: 46°50′N 00°30′E
- Country: France
- Region: Nouvelle-Aquitaine
- Department: Vienne
- No. of communes: {{{nbcomm}}}
- Established: 2017
- Area: 1,133.9 km^{2} (437.8 sq mi)
- Population (2019): 83,615
  - Density: 73.741/km^{2} (190.99/sq mi)
- Website: www.grand-chatellerault.fr

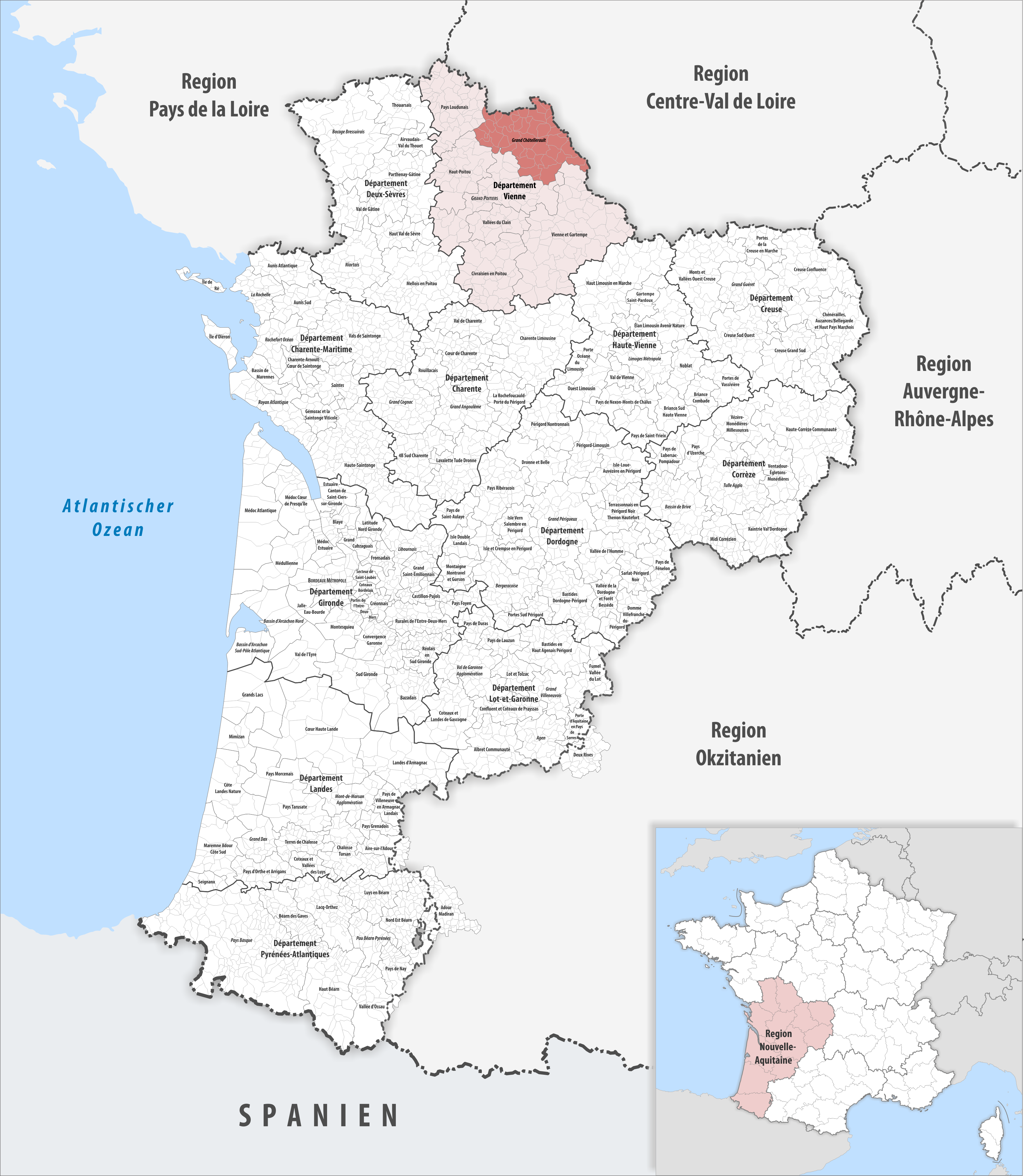
Location of the Grand Châtellerault community association

Communauté d'agglomération Grand Châtellerault is the communauté d'agglomération, an intercommunal structure, centred on the city of Châtellerault. It is located in the Vienne department, in the Nouvelle-Aquitaine region, western France. Created in 2017, its seat is in Châtellerault. Its area is 1133.9 km^{2}. Its population was 83,615 in 2019, of which 31,487 in Châtellerault proper.

== Composition ==
The communauté d'agglomération consists of the following 47 communes:

1. Angles-sur-l'Anglin
2. Antran
3. Archigny
4. Availles-en-Châtellerault
5. Bellefonds
6. Bonneuil-Matours
7. Buxeuil
8. Cenon-sur-Vienne
9. Cernay
10. Châtellerault
11. Chenevelles
12. Colombiers
13. Coussay-les-Bois
14. Dangé-Saint-Romain
15. Doussay
16. Ingrandes
17. Leigné-les-Bois
18. Leigné-sur-Usseau
19. Lencloître
20. Lésigny
21. Leugny
22. Mairé
23. Mondion
24. Monthoiron
25. Naintré
26. Orches
27. Les Ormes
28. Ouzilly
29. Oyré
30. Pleumartin
31. Port-de-Piles
32. La Roche-Posay
33. Saint-Christophe
34. Saint-Genest-d'Ambière
35. Saint-Gervais-les-Trois-Clochers
36. Saint-Rémy-sur-Creuse
37. Savigny-sous-Faye
38. Scorbé-Clairvaux
39. Senillé-Saint-Sauveur
40. Sérigny
41. Sossais
42. Thuré
43. Usseau
44. Vaux-sur-Vienne
45. Vellèches
46. Vicq-sur-Gartempe
47. Vouneuil-sur-Vienne
