= Usseau, Vienne =

Usseau
- Commune
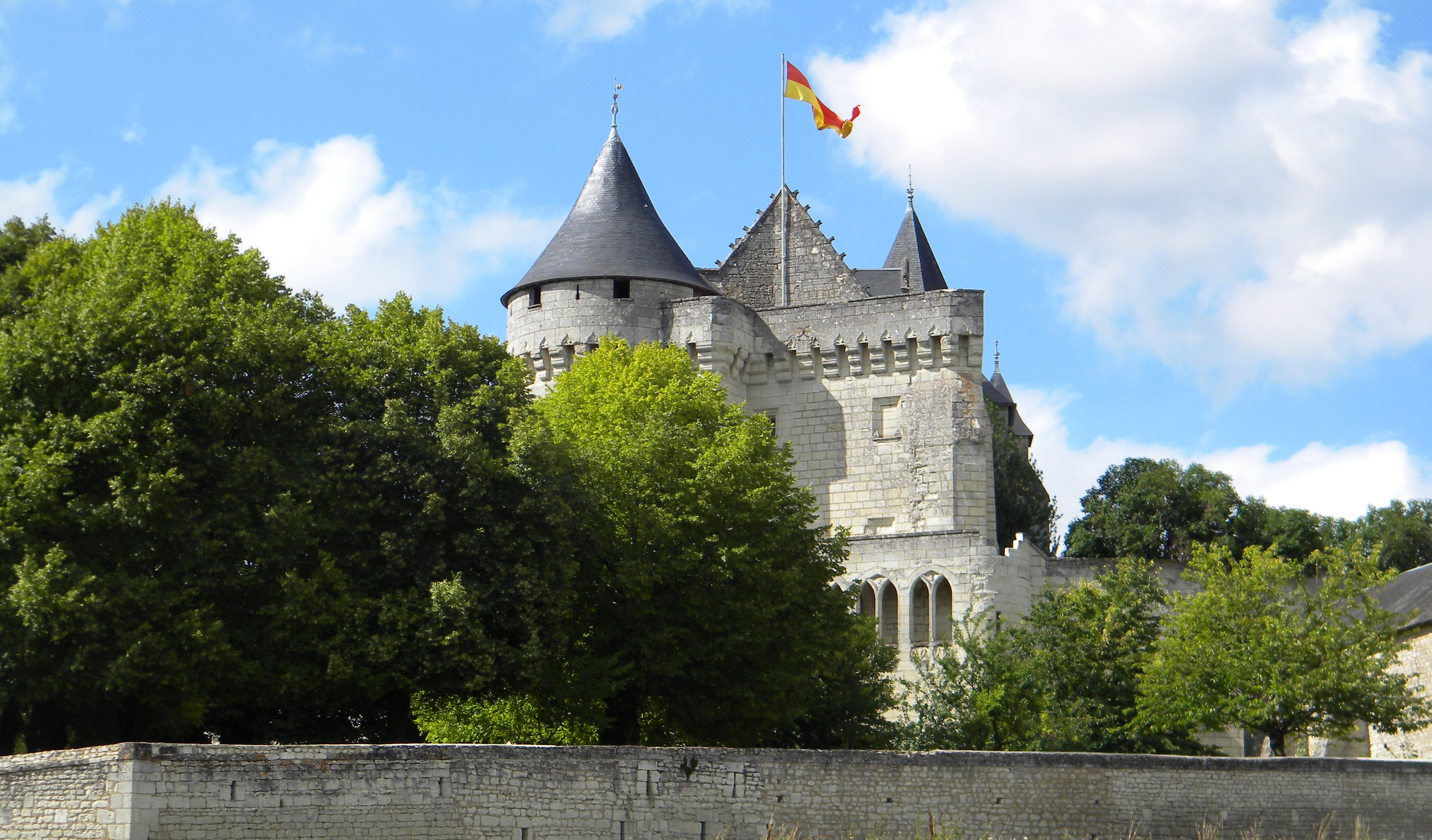
- The Château de la Motte, in Usseau
- Location of Usseau
- Location within France Location within Nouvelle-Aquitaine
- Coordinates: 46°52′37″N 0°30′34″E
- Country: France
- Region: Nouvelle-Aquitaine
- Department: Vienne
- Arrondissement: Châtellerault
- Canton: Châtellerault-2
- Intercommunality: CA Grand Châtellerault

Government
  - Mayor (2020–2026): Pascal Rocher
- Area^{1}: 18.95 km^{2} (7.32 sq mi)
- Elevation: 82 m (269 ft)
- Highest elevation: 163 m (535 ft)
- Lowest elevation: 71 m (233 ft)
- Population (2023): 573
  - Density: 30.2/km^{2} (78.3/sq mi)
- Time zone: UTC+01:00 (CET)
  - Summer (DST): UTC+02:00 (CEST)
- INSEE/Postal code: 86275 /86230
- ^{1} French Land Register data, which excludes lakes, ponds, glaciers > 1 km^{2} (0.386 sq mi or 247 acres) and river estuaries.

Usseau (French pronunciation: [yso]) is a commune in the Vienne department in the Nouvelle-Aquitaine region in western France.

== Demographics ==
Historical population
Year	Pop.	±% p.a.
1968	383	—
1975	383	+0.00%
1982	489	+3.55%
1990	521	+0.80%
1999	573	+1.06%
2007	643	+1.45%
2012	657	+0.43%
2017	607	−1.57%
2023	573	−0.96%
Source: INSEE

== See also ==
- Communes of the Vienne department
