= Arrondissement of Montmorillon =

Coordinates: 46.43°N 0.87°E

Montmorillon
- Arrondissement
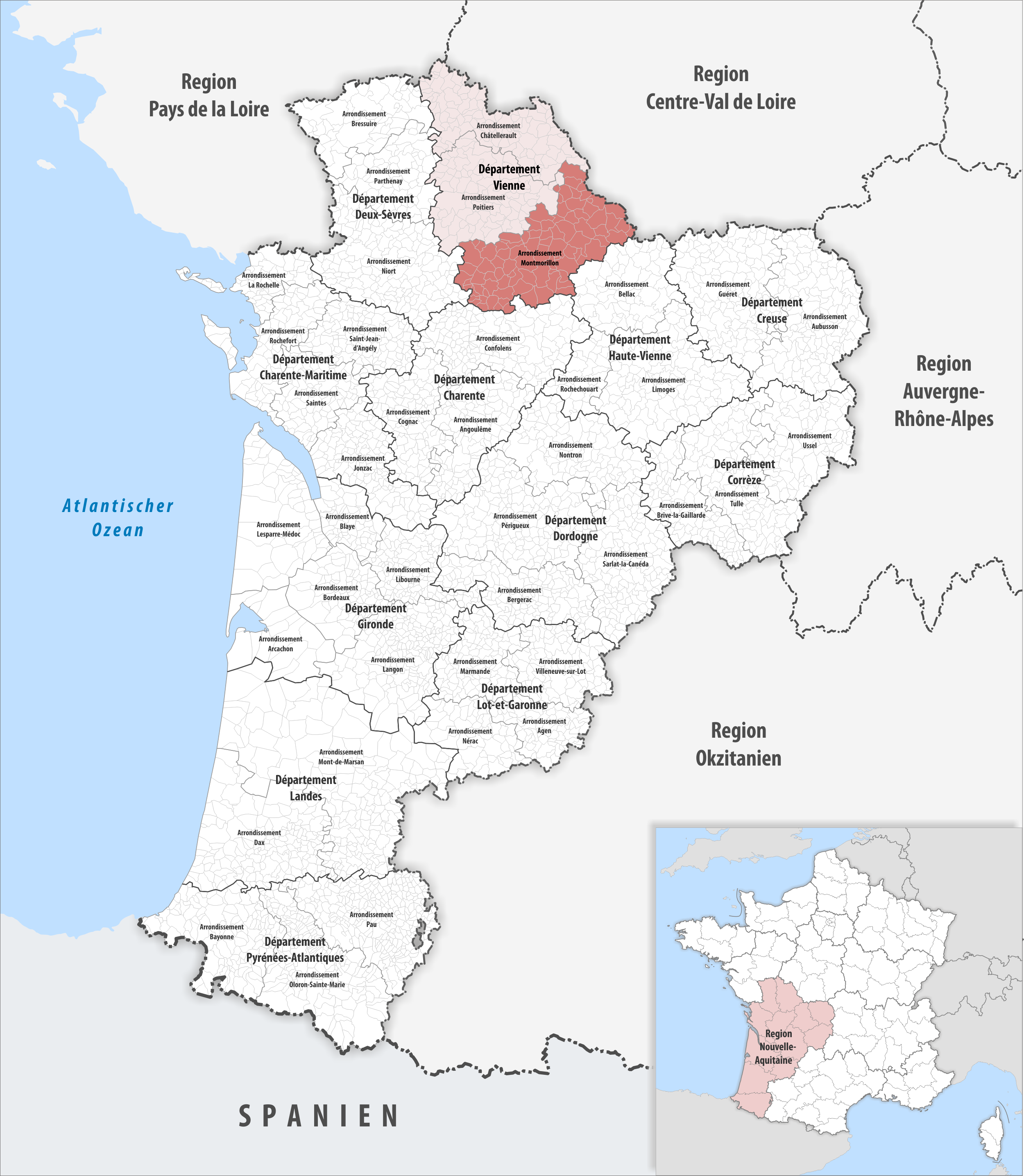
- Location within the region Nouvelle-Aquitaine
- Country: France
- Region: Nouvelle-Aquitaine
- Department: Vienne
- No. of communes: {{{nbcomm}}}
- Area: 2,876.1 km^{2} (1,110.5 sq mi)
- Population (2023): 65,211
  - Density: 22.673/km^{2} (58.724/sq mi)
- INSEE code: 862

The arrondissement of Montmorillon is an arrondissement of France in the Vienne department in the Nouvelle-Aquitaine region. It has 90 communes. Its population is 65,756 (2021), and its area is 2,876.1 km^{2} (1,110.5 sq mi).

== Composition ==
The communes of the arrondissement of Montmorillon, and their INSEE codes, are:

1. Adriers (86001)
2. Anché (86003)
3. Antigny (86006)
4. Asnières-sur-Blour (86011)
5. Asnois (86012)
6. Availles-Limouzine (86015)
7. Béthines (86025)
8. Blanzay (86029)
9. Bouresse (86034)
10. Bourg-Archambault (86035)
11. Brigueil-le-Chantre (86037)
12. Brion (86038)
13. Brux (86039)
14. La Bussière (86040)
15. Champagné-le-Sec (86051)
16. Champagné-Saint-Hilaire (86052)
17. Champniers (86054)
18. La Chapelle-Bâton (86055)
19. Chapelle-Viviers (86059)
20. Charroux (86061)
21. Chatain (86063)
22. Château-Garnier (86064)
23. Chaunay (86068)
24. Civaux (86077)
25. Civray (86078)
26. Coulonges (86084)
27. La Ferrière-Airoux (86097)
28. Fleix (86098)
29. Gençay (86103)
30. Genouillé (86104)
31. Gouex (86107)
32. Haims (86110)
33. L'Isle-Jourdain (86112)
34. Jouhet (86117)
35. Journet (86118)
36. Joussé (86119)
37. Lathus-Saint-Rémy (86120)
38. Lauthiers (86122)
39. Leignes-sur-Fontaine (86126)
40. Lhommaizé (86131)
41. Liglet (86132)
42. Linazay (86134)
43. Lizant (86136)
44. Luchapt (86138)
45. Lussac-les-Châteaux (86140)
46. Magné (86141)
47. Mauprévoir (86152)
48. Mazerolles (86153)
49. Millac (86159)
50. Montmorillon (86165)
51. Moulismes (86170)
52. Moussac (86171)
53. Mouterre-sur-Blourde (86172)
54. Nalliers (86175)
55. Nérignac (86176)
56. Paizay-le-Sec (86187)
57. Payroux (86189)
58. Persac (86190)
59. Pindray (86191)
60. Plaisance (86192)
61. Pressac (86200)
62. Queaux (86203)
63. Romagne (86211)
64. Saint-Gaudent (86220)
65. Saint-Germain (86223)
66. Saint-Laurent-de-Jourdes (86228)
67. Saint-Léomer (86230)
68. Saint-Martin-l'Ars (86234)
69. Saint-Maurice-la-Clouère (86235)
70. Saint-Pierre-de-Maillé (86236)
71. Saint-Pierre-d'Exideuil (86237)
72. Saint-Romain (86242)
73. Saint-Savin (86246)
74. Saint-Secondin (86248)
75. Saulgé (86254)
76. Savigné (86255)
77. Sillars (86262)
78. Sommières-du-Clain (86264)
79. Surin (86266)
80. Thollet (86270)
81. La Trimouille (86273)
82. Usson-du-Poitou (86276)
83. Val-de-Comporté (86247)
84. Valdivienne (86233)
85. Valence-en-Poitou (86082)
86. Verrières (86285)
87. Le Vigeant (86289)
88. Villemort (86291)
89. Voulême (86295)
90. Voulon (86296)

== History ==
The arrondissement of Montmorillon was created in 1800. At the January 2017 reorganisation of the arrondissements of Vienne, it lost one commune to the arrondissement of Châtellerault and four communes to the arrondissement of Poitiers.

As a result of the reorganisation of the cantons of France which came into effect in 2015, the borders of the cantons are no longer related to the borders of the arrondissements. The cantons of the arrondissement of Montmorillon were, as of January 2015:

1. Availles-Limouzine
2. Charroux
3. Chauvigny
4. Civray
5. Couhé
6. Gençay
7. L'Isle-Jourdain
8. Lussac-les-Châteaux
9. Montmorillon
10. Saint-Savin
11. La Trimouille
