= La Chapelle-Bâton =

La Chapelle-Bâton may refer to the following places in France:

- La Chapelle-Bâton, Deux-Sèvres, a commune in the Deux-Sèvres department
- La Chapelle-Bâton, Vienne, a commune in the Vienne department
