= Champniers =

Champniers may refer to several communes in France:

- Champniers, Charente
- Champniers, Vienne
- Champniers-et-Reilhac, Dordogne
