= Joussé =

- Commune
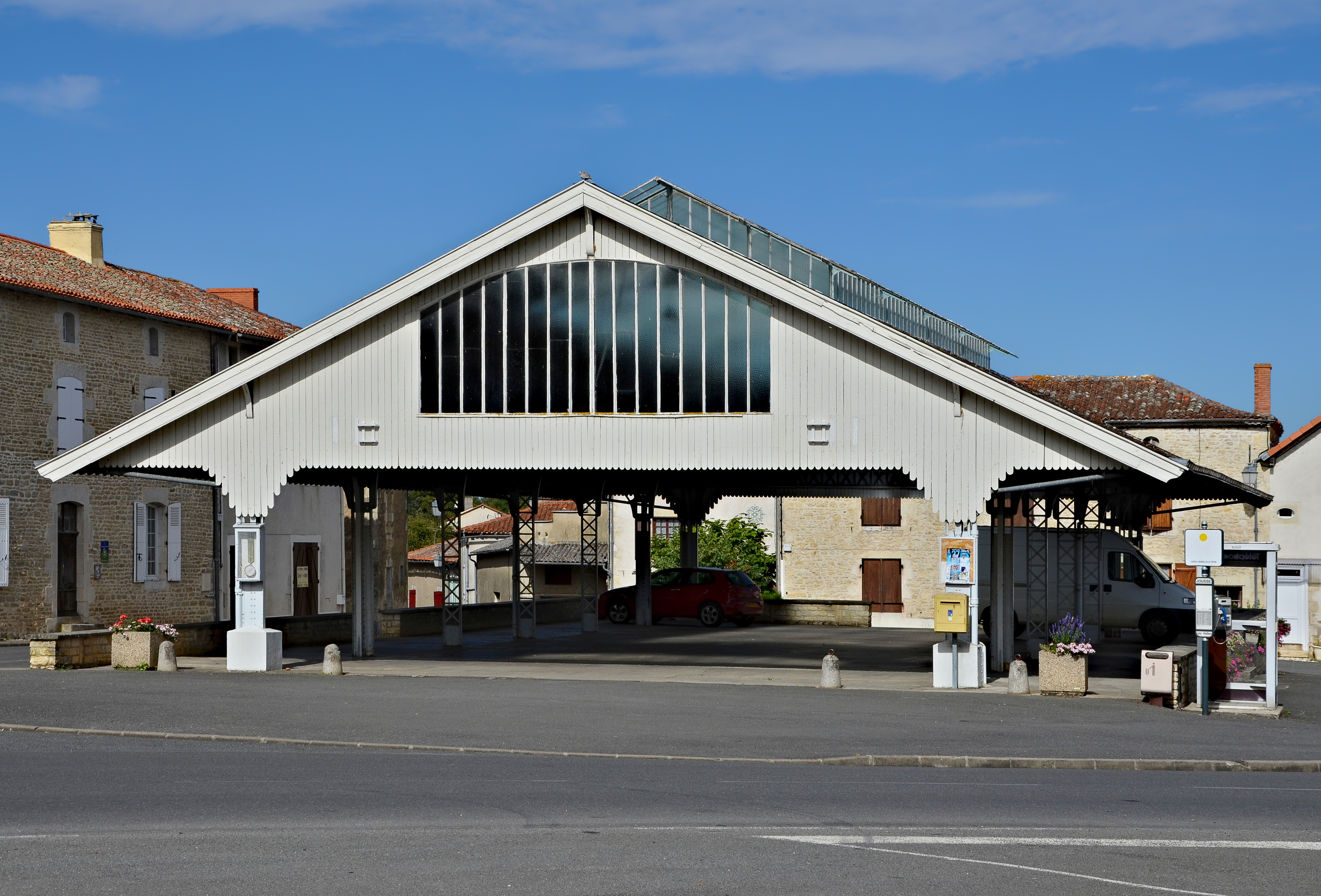
- The market hall in Joussé
- Location of Joussé
- Location within France Location within Nouvelle-Aquitaine
- Coordinates: 46°13′40″N 0°28′17″E
- Country: France
- Region: Nouvelle-Aquitaine
- Department: Vienne
- Arrondissement: Montmorillon
- Canton: Civray

Government
  - Mayor (2020–2026): Lydie Noirault
- Area^{1}: 7.59 km^{2} (2.93 sq mi)
- Elevation: 150 m (490 ft)
- Highest elevation: 171 m (561 ft)
- Lowest elevation: 124 m (407 ft)
- Population (2023): 309
  - Density: 40.7/km^{2} (105/sq mi)
- Time zone: UTC+01:00 (CET)
  - Summer (DST): UTC+02:00 (CEST)
- INSEE/Postal code: 86119 /86350
- ^{1} French Land Register data, which excludes lakes, ponds, glaciers > 1 km^{2} (0.386 sq mi or 247 acres) and river estuaries.

Joussé (French pronunciation: [ʒuse]) is a commune in the Vienne department in the Nouvelle-Aquitaine region in western France.

== See also ==
- Communes of the Vienne department
