= Genouillé, Vienne =

Genouillé
- Commune
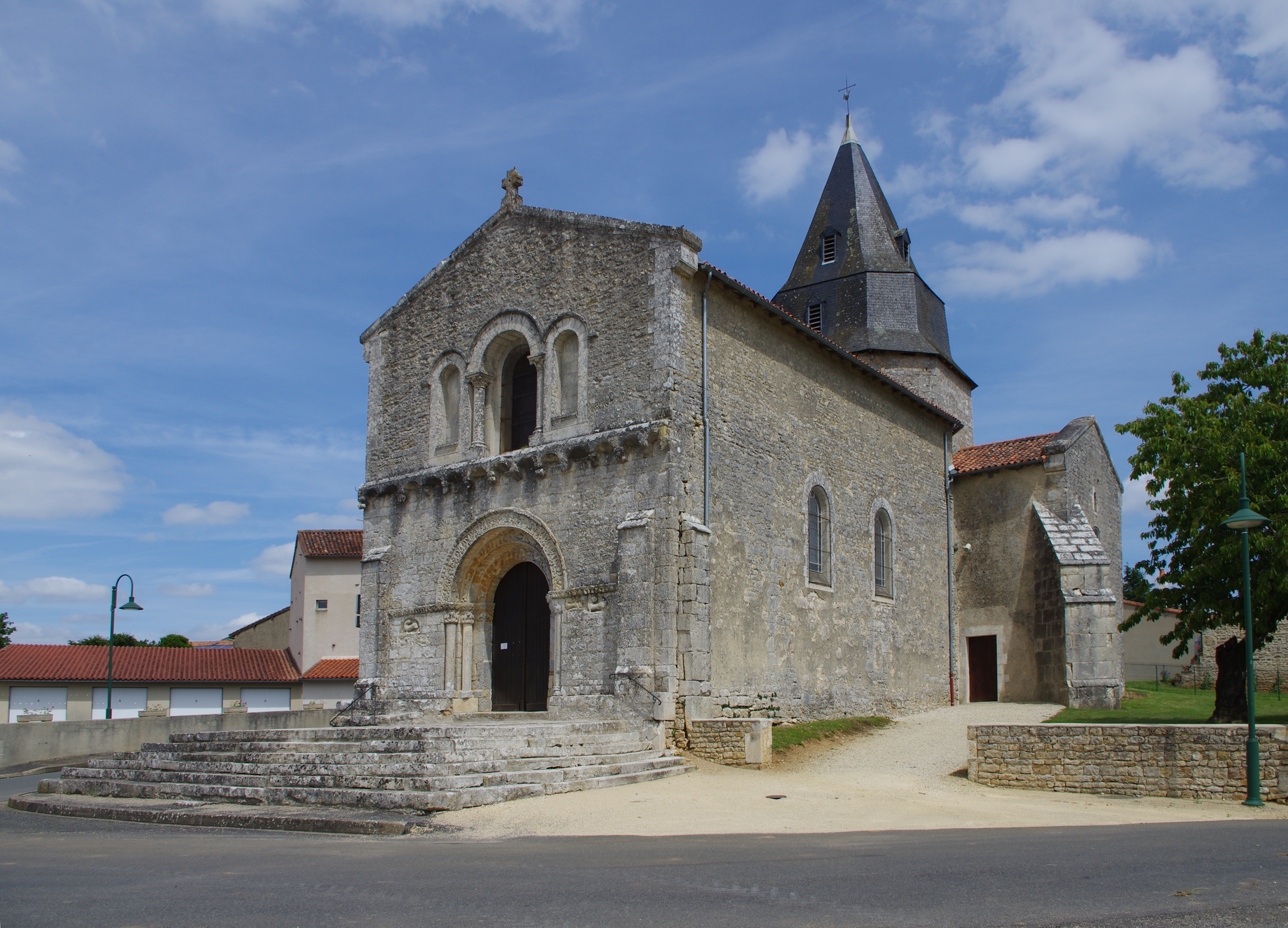
- The church in Genouillé
- Location of Genouillé
- Location within France Location within Nouvelle-Aquitaine
- Coordinates: 46°06′28″N 0°20′18″E
- Country: France
- Region: Nouvelle-Aquitaine
- Department: Vienne
- Arrondissement: Montmorillon
- Canton: Civray
- Intercommunality: Civraisien en Poitou

Government
  - Mayor (2020–2026): Jean-Guy Valette
- Area^{1}: 29.80 km^{2} (11.51 sq mi)
- Elevation: 152 m (499 ft)
- Highest elevation: 179 m (587 ft)
- Lowest elevation: 116 m (381 ft)
- Population (2023): 504
  - Density: 16.9/km^{2} (43.8/sq mi)
- Time zone: UTC+01:00 (CET)
  - Summer (DST): UTC+02:00 (CEST)
- INSEE/Postal code: 86104 /86250
- ^{1} French Land Register data, which excludes lakes, ponds, glaciers > 1 km^{2} (0.386 sq mi or 247 acres) and river estuaries.

Genouillé (French pronunciation: [ʒənuje]) is a commune in the Vienne department in the Nouvelle-Aquitaine region in western France. Its population has been declining from its peak of 1495 in 1886 to its current level of 504 (2018).

== Gallery ==
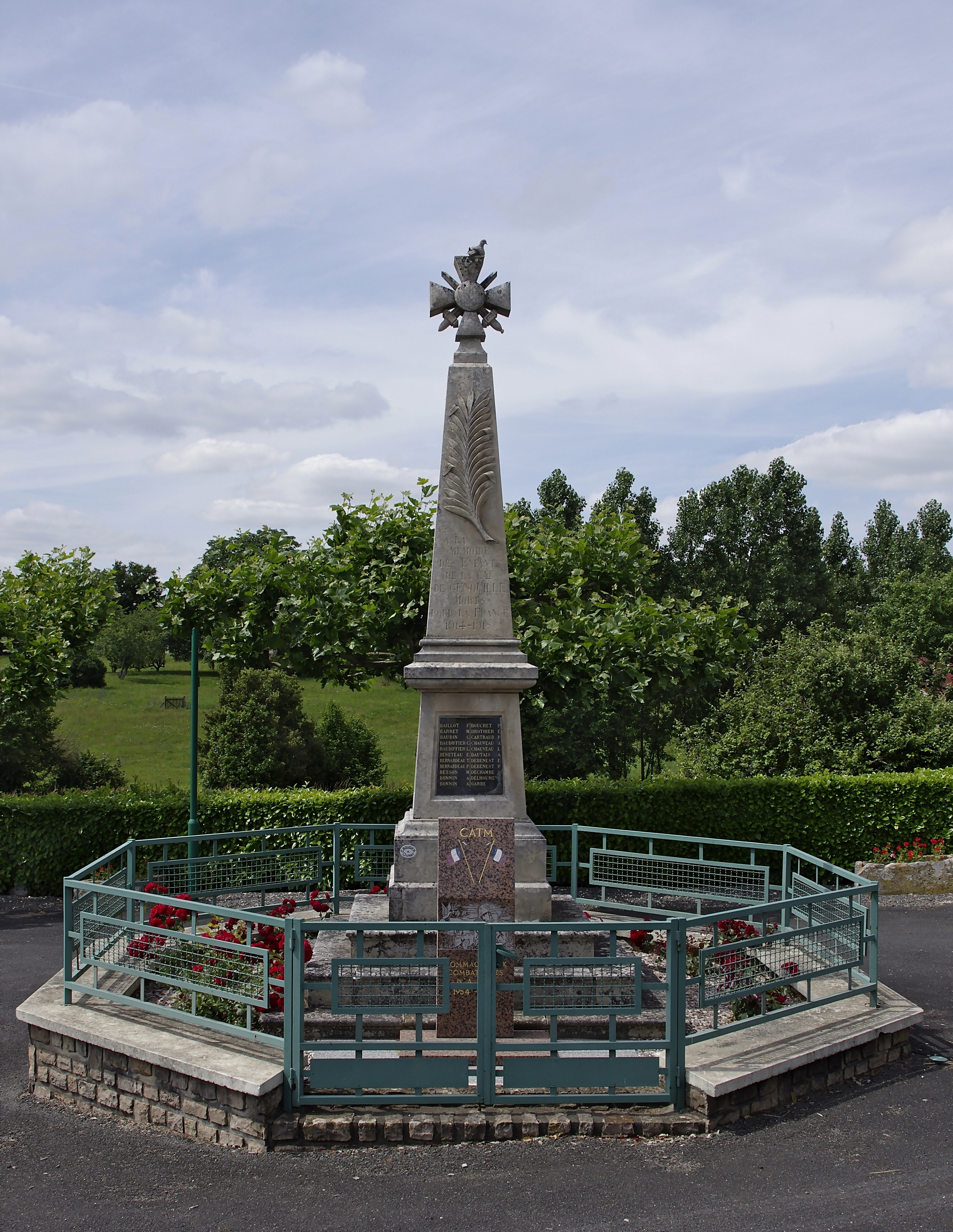
War memorial in Genouillé

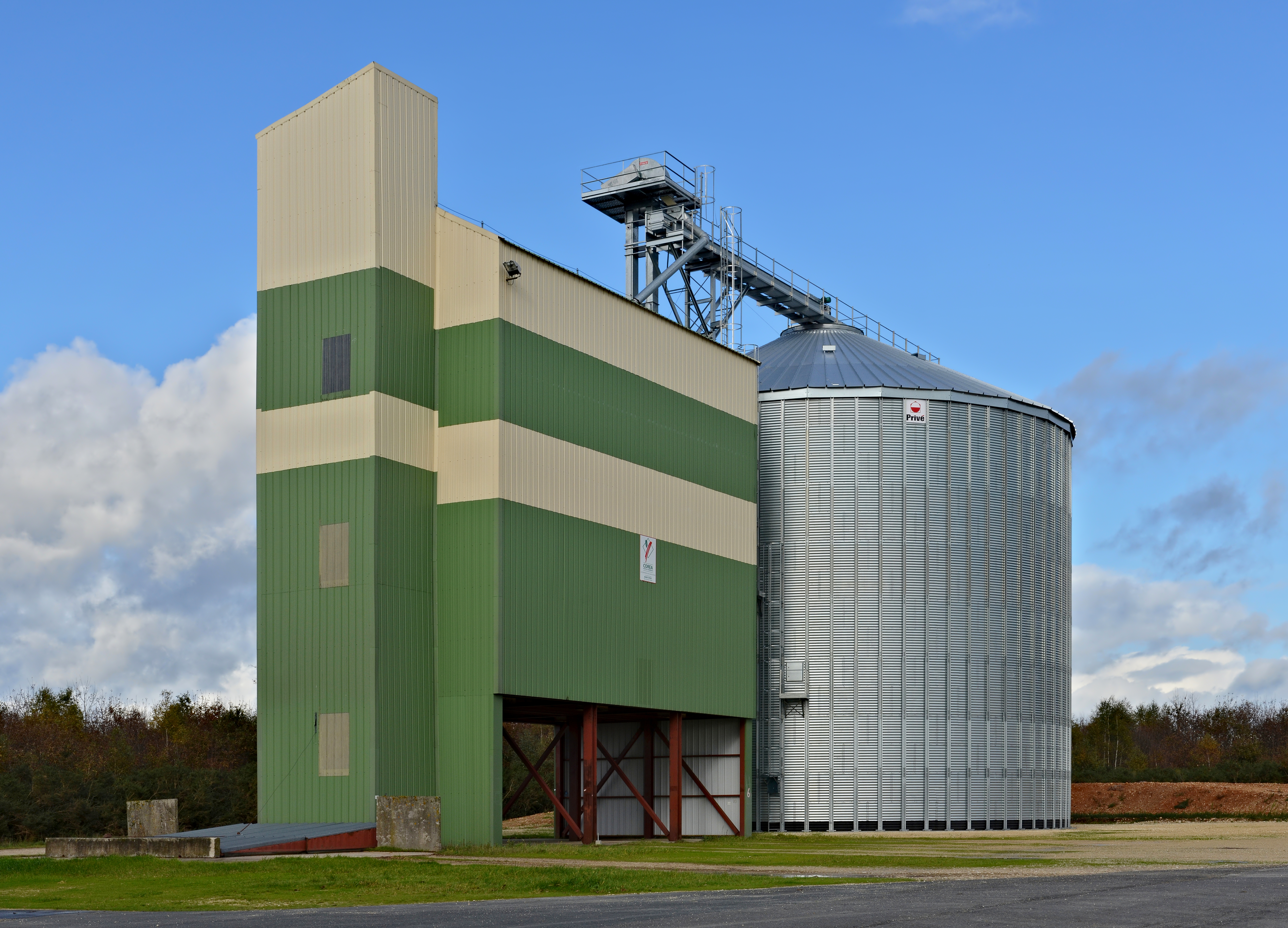
Silo (COREA Poitou-Charentes) in Genouillé

== See also ==
- Communes of the Vienne department
