= Château-Garnier =

- Commune
- Coat of arms
- Location of Château-Garnier
- Location within France Location within Nouvelle-Aquitaine
- Coordinates: 46°15′35″N 0°25′36″E
- Country: France
- Region: Nouvelle-Aquitaine
- Department: Vienne
- Arrondissement: Montmorillon
- Canton: Civray

Government
  - Mayor (2020–2026): François Audoux
- Area^{1}: 35.89 km^{2} (13.86 sq mi)
- Elevation: 155 m (509 ft)
- Highest elevation: 159 m (522 ft)
- Lowest elevation: 117 m (384 ft)
- Population (2023): 596
  - Density: 16.6/km^{2} (43.0/sq mi)
- Time zone: UTC+01:00 (CET)
  - Summer (DST): UTC+02:00 (CEST)
- INSEE/Postal code: 86064 /86350
- ^{1} French Land Register data, which excludes lakes, ponds, glaciers > 1 km^{2} (0.386 sq mi or 247 acres) and river estuaries.

Château-Garnier (French pronunciation: [ʃɑto ɡaʁnje]) is a commune in the Vienne department in the Nouvelle-Aquitaine region in western France.

The name Garnier possibly derives from Garrison, (D'Oc), (Garrison in English). There was probably a Roman garrison on the site, succeeded by a Chateau. Evidence of the building stones of the Chateau are still noticeable throughout the village. The Chateau Monchandy just upstream on the Clain, and visible from the village is unique architecturally as are many of the houses found within the commune.

It is a rural agricultural community, but as it is on one of the main St Jacques de Compostelle routes, a steady flow of cyclists and hikers pass through the village.

Alfred Bouchard, (Maquis Renard D3), tortured and killed for his involvement with the Marquis by the Nazis, lived here. The whole area was a hot bed of resistance during World War II. One of the main roads in the village has been subsequently named after him.

The Plan D'Eau is renowned for its carp fishing and is one of largest fishing lakes in the area.

The surrounding countryside is rich agricultural land, predominantly sunflowers and maize. The wildlife of the area is also rich and Wild Boar can be found in abundance.

== See also ==
- Communes of the Vienne department
