= Surin, Vienne =

Surin
- Commune
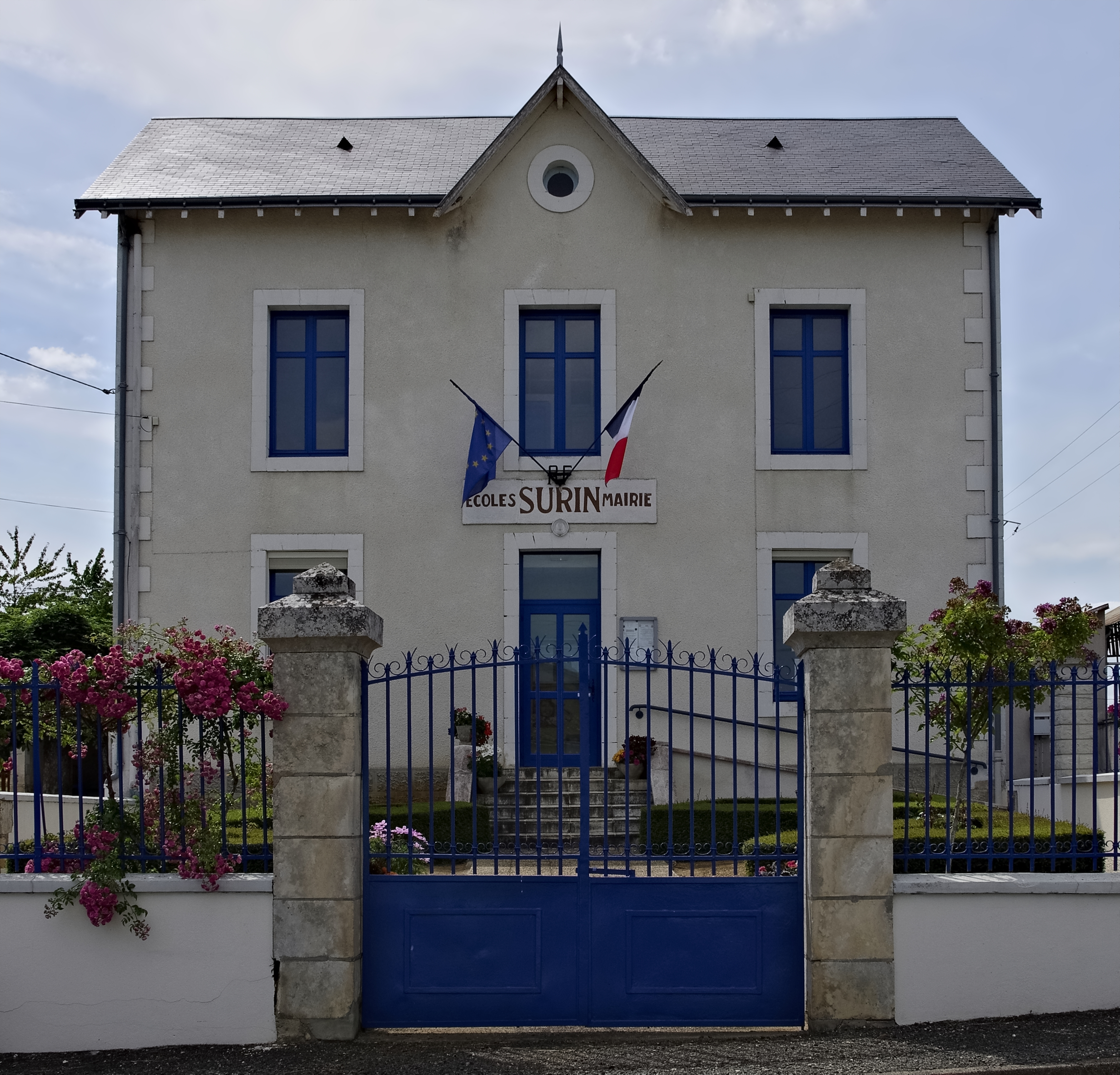
- The town hall in Surin
- Location of Surin
- Location within France Location within Nouvelle-Aquitaine
- Coordinates: 46°04′44″N 0°22′19″E
- Country: France
- Region: Nouvelle-Aquitaine
- Department: Vienne
- Arrondissement: Montmorillon
- Canton: Civray

Government
  - Mayor (2020–2026): Claudie Memin
- Area^{1}: 11.91 km^{2} (4.60 sq mi)
- Elevation: 177 m (581 ft)
- Highest elevation: 188 m (617 ft)
- Lowest elevation: 138 m (453 ft)
- Population (2023): 123
  - Density: 10.3/km^{2} (26.7/sq mi)
- Time zone: UTC+01:00 (CET)
  - Summer (DST): UTC+02:00 (CEST)
- INSEE/Postal code: 86266 /86250
- ^{1} French Land Register data, which excludes lakes, ponds, glaciers > 1 km^{2} (0.386 sq mi or 247 acres) and river estuaries.

Surin (French pronunciation: [syʁɛ̃]) is a commune in the Vienne department in the Nouvelle-Aquitaine region in western France.

== Population ==
Historical population
| Year | Pop. | ±% p.a. |
|---|---|---|
| 1968 | 265 | — |
| 1975 | 254 | −0.60% |
| 1982 | 192 | −3.92% |
| 1990 | 151 | −2.96% |
| 1999 | 172 | +1.46% |
| 2007 | 146 | −2.03% |
| 2012 | 109 | −5.68% |
| 2017 | 133 | +4.06% |
| 2023 | 123 | −1.29% |
Source: INSEE

== Attractions ==
There is the Porcheron Chantal, which is a restaurant and the Château de Cibioux.

== See also ==
- Communes of the Vienne department
