= Savigné =

- Commune
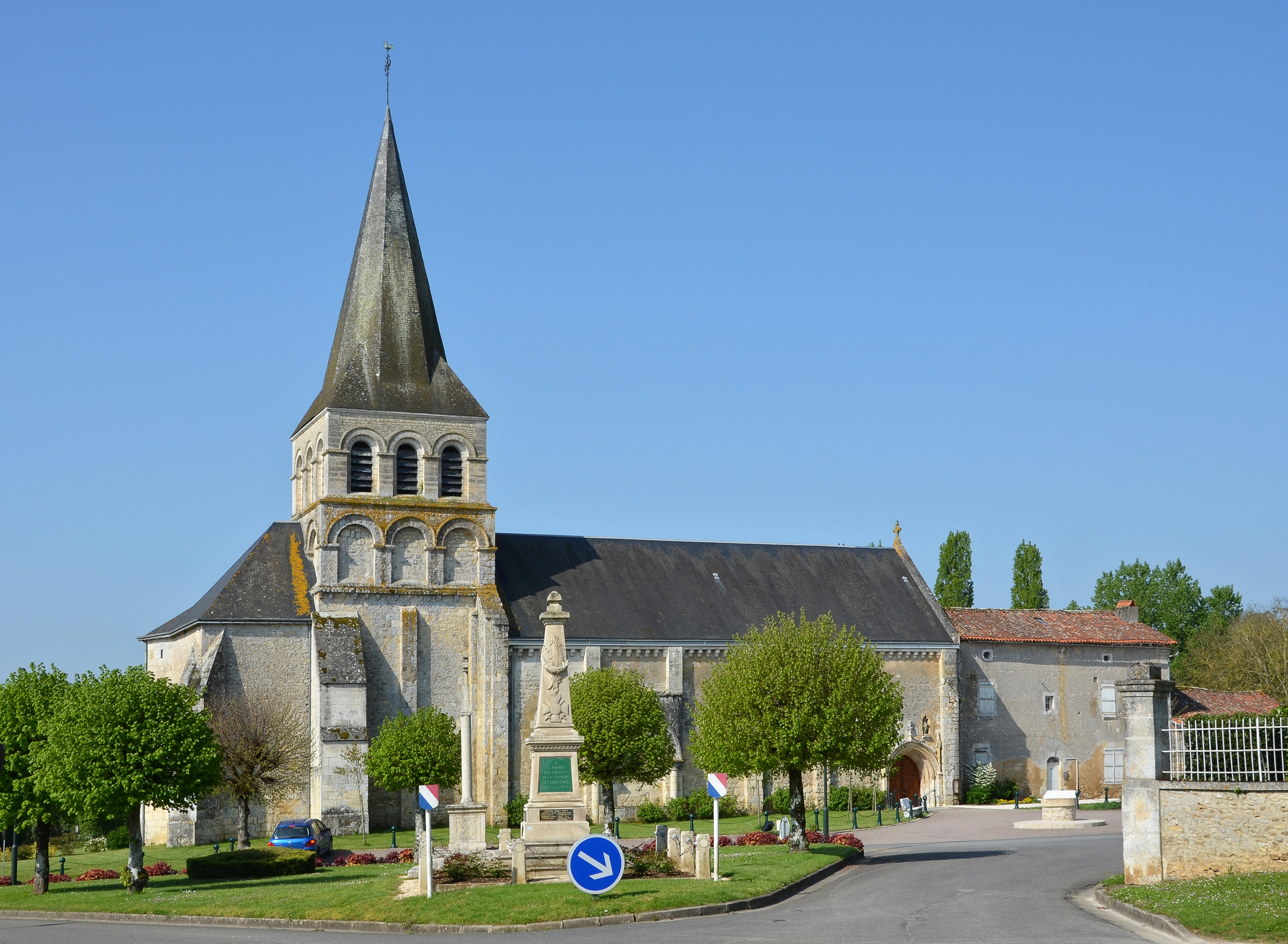
- Church and War memorial
- Location of Savigné
- Location within France Location within Nouvelle-Aquitaine
- Coordinates: 46°09′33″N 0°19′18″E
- Country: France
- Region: Nouvelle-Aquitaine
- Department: Vienne
- Arrondissement: Montmorillon
- Canton: Civray
- Intercommunality: Civraisien en Poitou

Government
  - Mayor (2020–2026): Jacques Augris
- Area^{1}: 36.35 km^{2} (14.03 sq mi)
- Elevation: 140 m (460 ft)
- Highest elevation: 161 m (528 ft)
- Lowest elevation: 110 m (360 ft)
- Population (2023): 1,256
  - Density: 34.55/km^{2} (89.49/sq mi)
- Time zone: UTC+01:00 (CET)
  - Summer (DST): UTC+02:00 (CEST)
- INSEE/Postal code: 86255 /86400
- ^{1} French Land Register data, which excludes lakes, ponds, glaciers > 1 km^{2} (0.386 sq mi or 247 acres) and river estuaries.

Savigné (French pronunciation: [saviɲe]) is a commune in the Vienne department in the Nouvelle-Aquitaine region in western France.

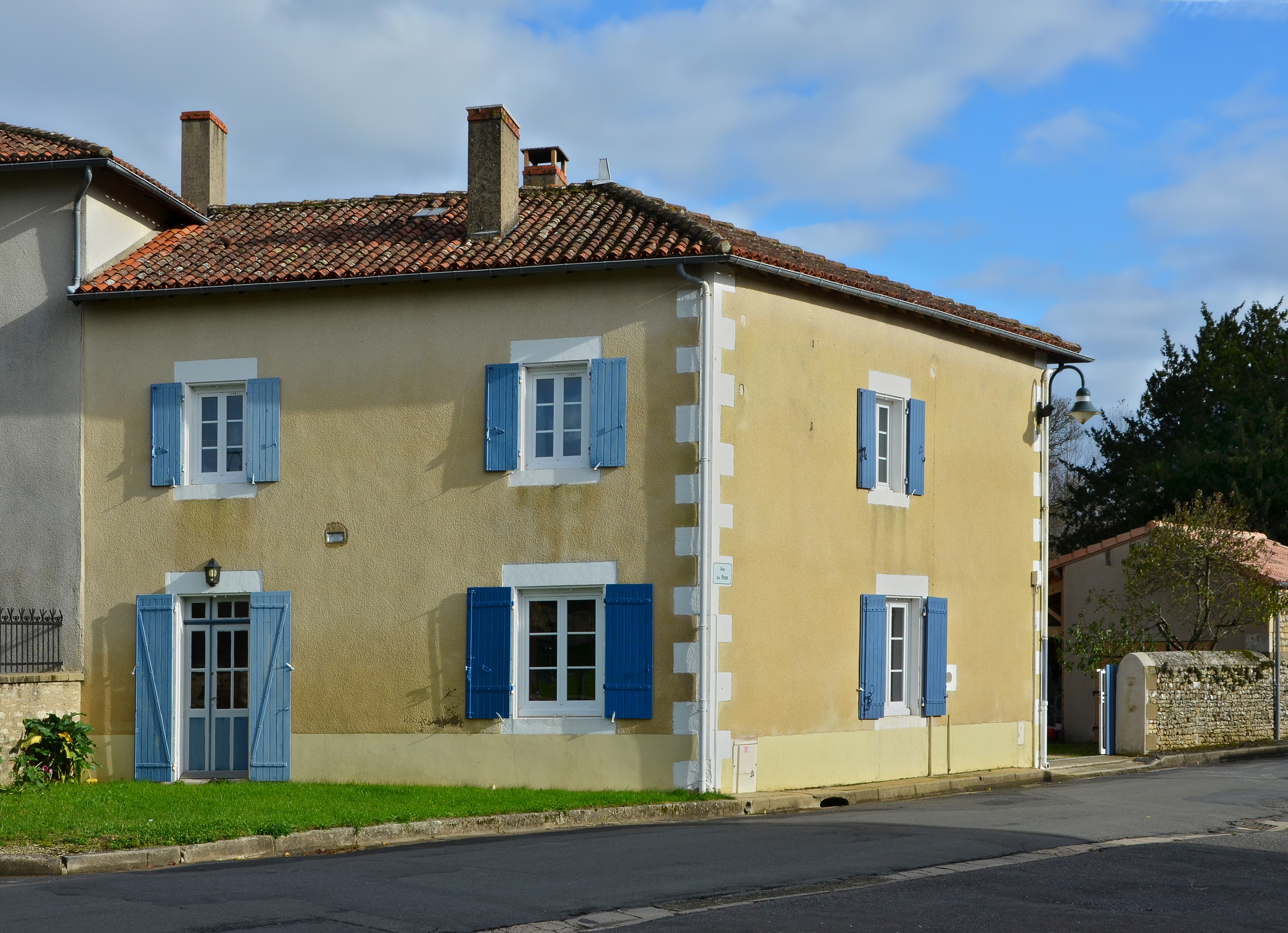
Renewed traditional house in Savigné

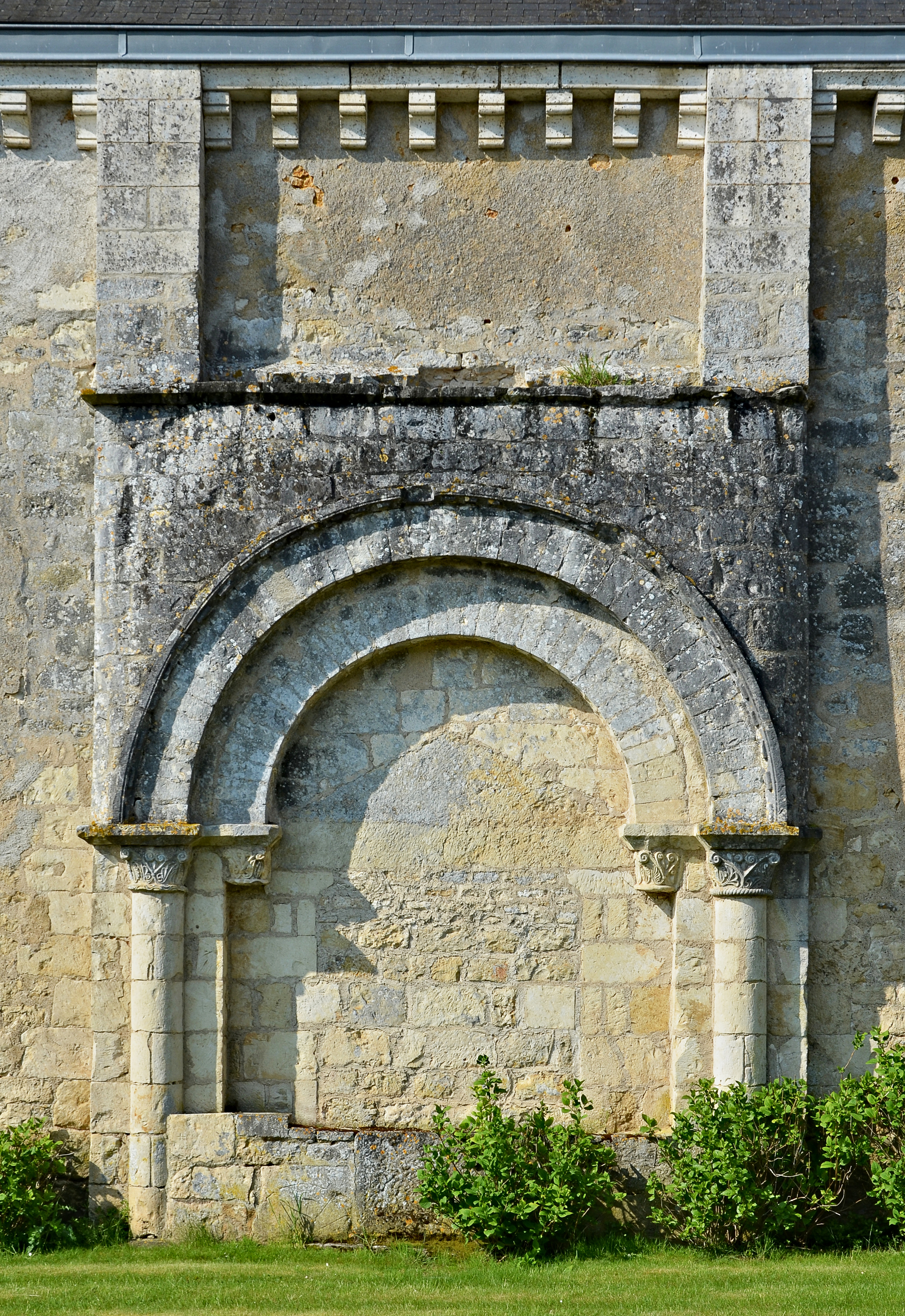
Former side portal of the church (12th-15th centuries) in Savigné

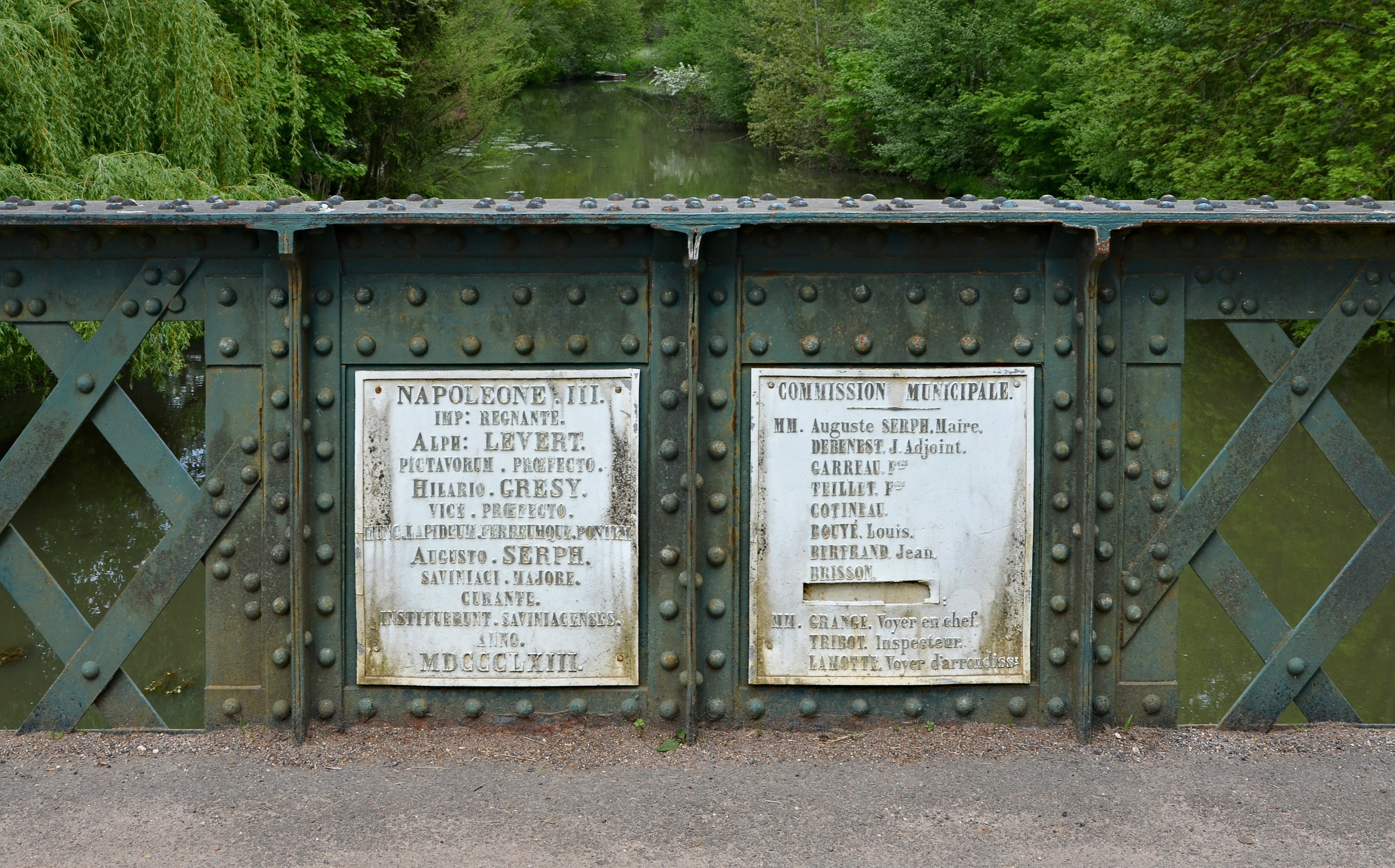
Plaques (one of them vandalized) commemorating the building of an iron and stone bridge on the river Charente (1863)

== See also ==
- Communes of the Vienne department
