= Lizant =

- Commune
- Coat of arms
- Location of Lizant
- Location within France Location within Nouvelle-Aquitaine
- Coordinates: 46°05′10″N 0°16′48″E
- Country: France
- Region: Nouvelle-Aquitaine
- Department: Vienne
- Arrondissement: Montmorillon
- Canton: Civray
- Intercommunality: Civraisien en Poitou

Government
  - Mayor (2020–2026): Jean-Claude Gauthier
- Area^{1}: 16.95 km^{2} (6.54 sq mi)
- Elevation: 140 m (460 ft)
- Highest elevation: 157 m (515 ft)
- Lowest elevation: 92 m (302 ft)
- Population (2023): 393
  - Density: 23.2/km^{2} (60.1/sq mi)
- Time zone: UTC+01:00 (CET)
  - Summer (DST): UTC+02:00 (CEST)
- INSEE/Postal code: 86136 /86400
- ^{1} French Land Register data, which excludes lakes, ponds, glaciers > 1 km^{2} (0.386 sq mi or 247 acres) and river estuaries.

Lizant (French pronunciation: [lizɑ̃]) a commune in the Vienne department in the Nouvelle-Aquitaine region in western France.

== See also ==
- Communes of the Vienne department
