= Sommières-du-Clain =

- Commune
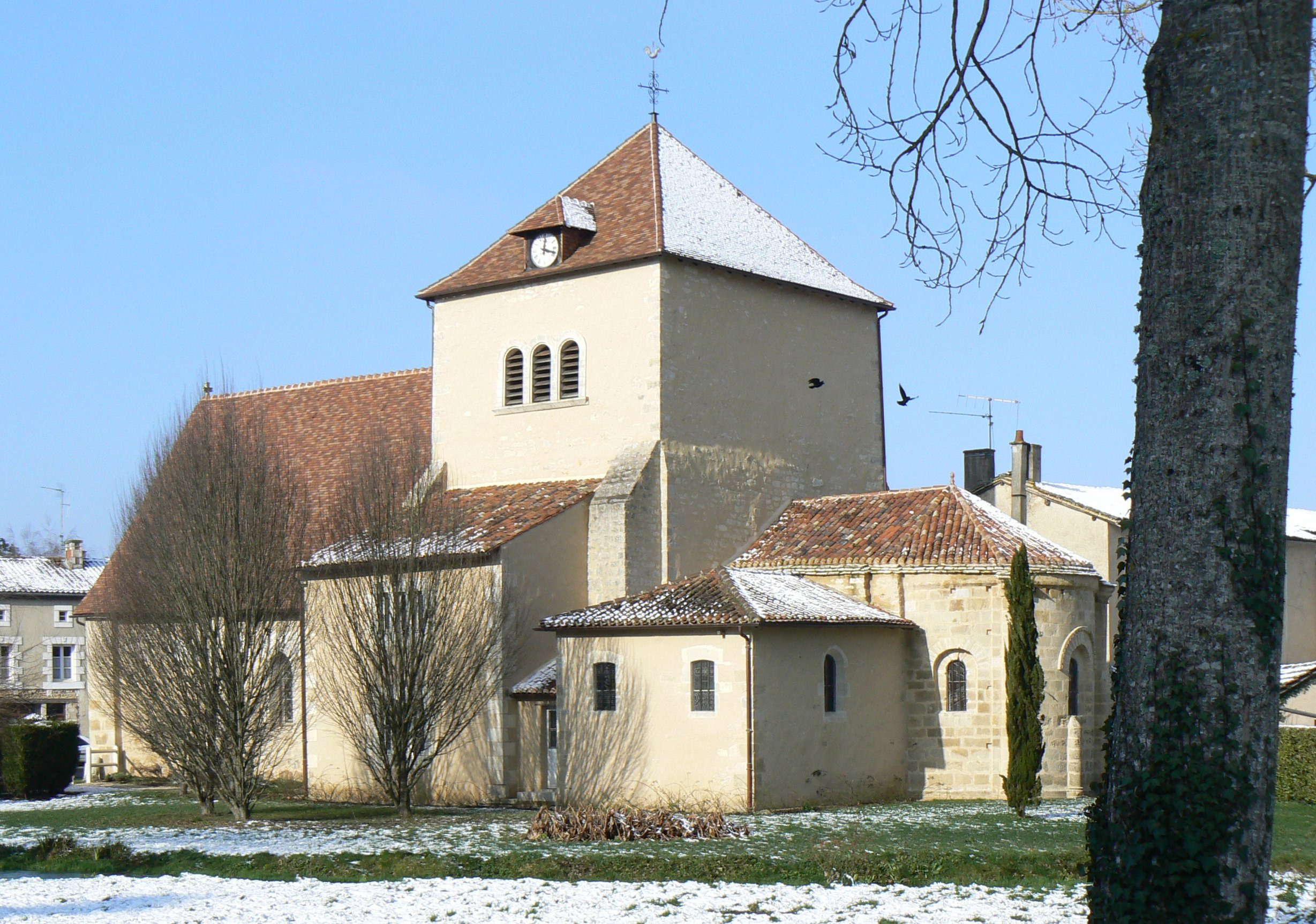
- The church in Sommières-du-Clain
- Location of Sommières-du-Clain
- Location within France Location within Nouvelle-Aquitaine
- Coordinates: 46°16′50″N 0°21′36″E
- Country: France
- Region: Nouvelle-Aquitaine
- Department: Vienne
- Arrondissement: Montmorillon
- Canton: Civray

Government
  - Mayor (2020–2026): René Morisset
- Area^{1}: 26.21 km^{2} (10.12 sq mi)
- Elevation: 115 m (377 ft)
- Highest elevation: 152 m (499 ft)
- Lowest elevation: 107 m (351 ft)
- Population (2023): 729
  - Density: 27.8/km^{2} (72.0/sq mi)
- Time zone: UTC+01:00 (CET)
  - Summer (DST): UTC+02:00 (CEST)
- INSEE/Postal code: 86264 /86160
- ^{1} French Land Register data, which excludes lakes, ponds, glaciers > 1 km^{2} (0.386 sq mi or 247 acres) and river estuaries.

Sommières-du-Clain (French pronunciation: [sɔmjɛʁ dy klɛ̃]) is a commune in the Vienne department in the Nouvelle-Aquitaine region in western France.

== Toponymy ==
It has been suggested that the name is derived from the Celtic words "Soli", suggested to be the name of a chieftain, and "maros" which means "big". However, there is ample evidence of the existence of a Celtic goddess named Solimara. Coins with her name and inscriptions dedicated to her have been found at Bourges. The maro/mara means "great", and Soli is from the Celtic "souli" meaning sun. It is far more likely that her worship was spread more widely throughout Gaul and that the name of the village is linked to an actual name/figure rather than one of conjecture.

== See also ==
- Communes of the Vienne department
- The works of Maxime Real del Sarte
