= La Ferrière-Airoux =

- Commune
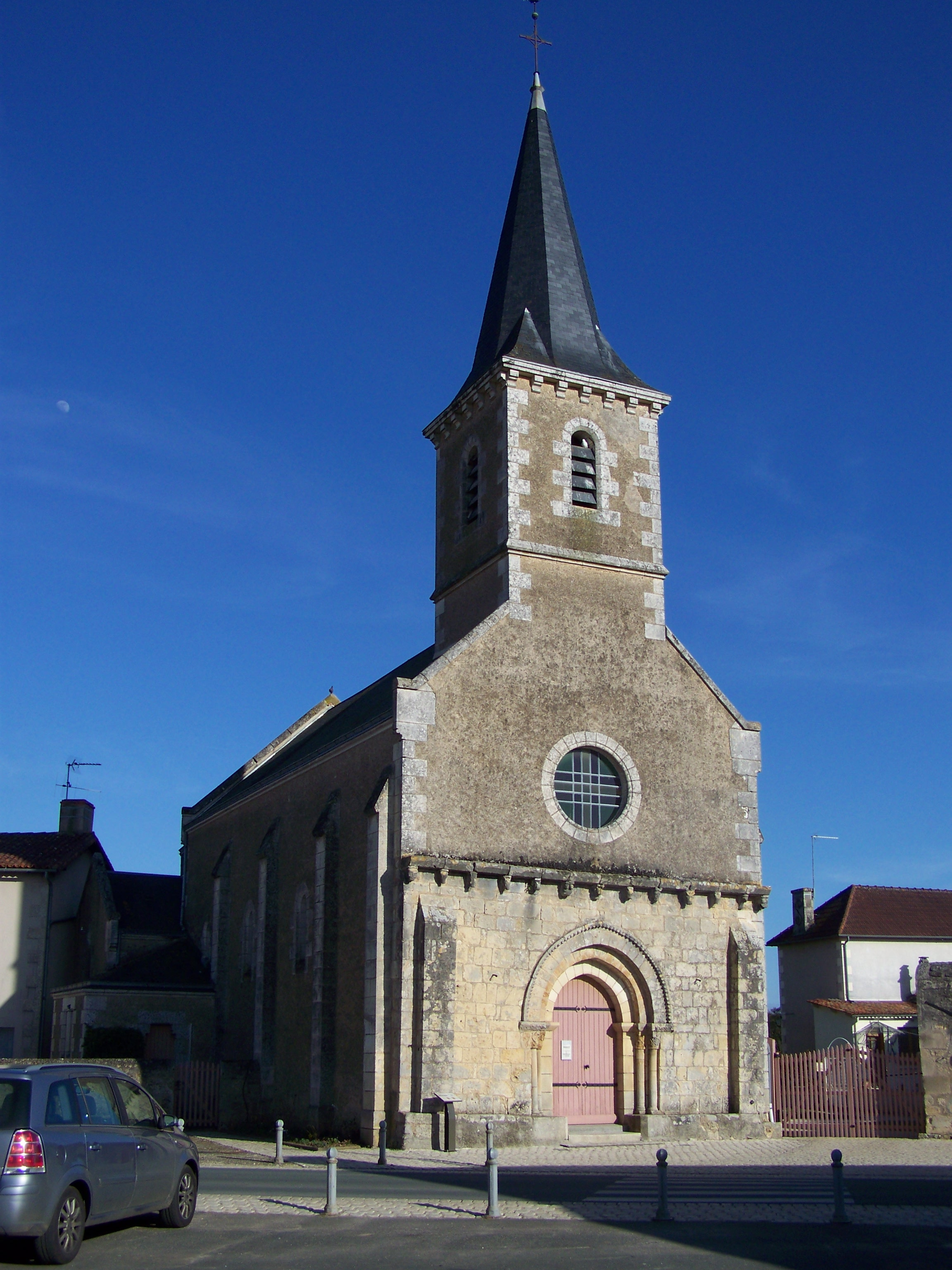
- The church in La Ferrière-Airoux
- Location of La Ferrière-Airoux
- Location within France Location within Nouvelle-Aquitaine
- Coordinates: 46°19′20″N 0°23′36″E
- Country: France
- Region: Nouvelle-Aquitaine
- Department: Vienne
- Arrondissement: Montmorillon
- Canton: Civray

Government
  - Mayor (2020–2026): Rémy Coopman
- Area^{1}: 27.22 km^{2} (10.51 sq mi)
- Elevation: 121 m (397 ft)
- Highest elevation: 150 m (490 ft)
- Lowest elevation: 114 m (374 ft)
- Population (2023): 334
  - Density: 12.3/km^{2} (31.8/sq mi)
- Time zone: UTC+01:00 (CET)
  - Summer (DST): UTC+02:00 (CEST)
- INSEE/Postal code: 86097 /86160
- ^{1} French Land Register data, which excludes lakes, ponds, glaciers > 1 km^{2} (0.386 sq mi or 247 acres) and river estuaries.

La Ferrière-Airoux (French pronunciation: [la fɛʁjɛʁ ɛʁu]) is a commune in the Vienne department in the Nouvelle-Aquitaine region in western France.

== See also ==
- Communes of the Vienne department
