= Linazay =

- Commune
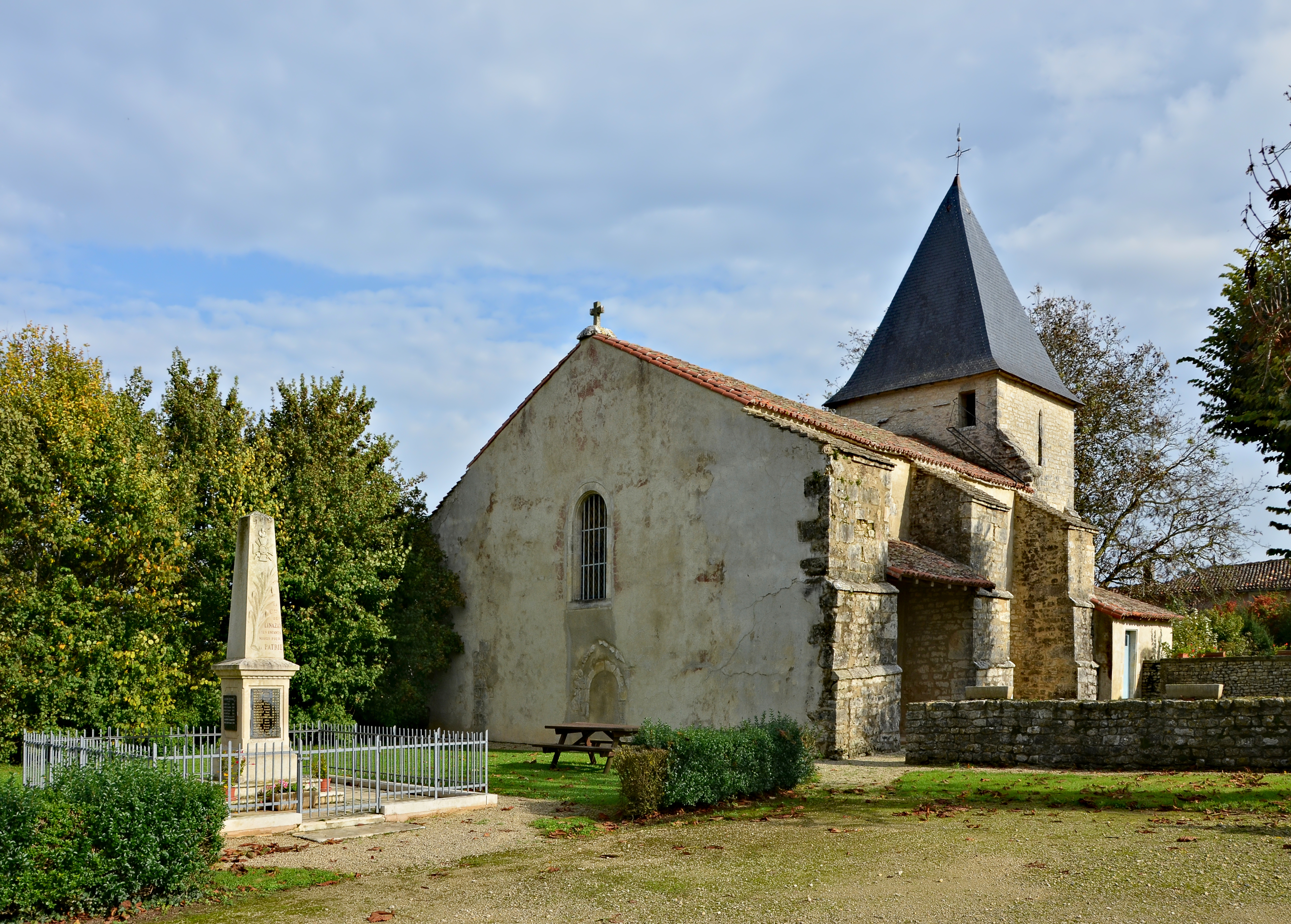
- The church as seen from SW
- Location of Linazay
- Location within France Location within Nouvelle-Aquitaine
- Coordinates: 46°09′54″N 0°10′59″E
- Country: France
- Region: Nouvelle-Aquitaine
- Department: Vienne
- Arrondissement: Montmorillon
- Canton: Civray
- Intercommunality: Civraisien en Poitou

Government
  - Mayor (2020–2026): Jean-Luc Chauvergne
- Area^{1}: 9.14 km^{2} (3.53 sq mi)
- Elevation: 120 m (390 ft)
- Highest elevation: 135 m (443 ft)
- Lowest elevation: 117 m (384 ft)
- Population (2023): 216
  - Density: 23.6/km^{2} (61.2/sq mi)
- Time zone: UTC+01:00 (CET)
  - Summer (DST): UTC+02:00 (CEST)
- INSEE/Postal code: 86134 /86400
- ^{1} French Land Register data, which excludes lakes, ponds, glaciers > 1 km^{2} (0.386 sq mi or 247 acres) and river estuaries.

Linazay (French pronunciation: [linazɛ]) is a commune in the Vienne department in the Nouvelle-Aquitaine region in western France.

== See also ==
- Communes of the Vienne department
