= Mauprévoir =

- Commune
- Location of Mauprévoir
- Location within France Location within Nouvelle-Aquitaine
- Coordinates: 46°10′26″N 0°31′05″E
- Country: France
- Region: Nouvelle-Aquitaine
- Department: Vienne
- Arrondissement: Montmorillon
- Canton: Civray

Government
  - Mayor (2020–2026): Jean-Michel Faroux
- Area^{1}: 48.59 km^{2} (18.76 sq mi)
- Elevation: 142 m (466 ft)
- Highest elevation: 188 m (617 ft)
- Lowest elevation: 132 m (433 ft)
- Population (2023): 608
  - Density: 12.5/km^{2} (32.4/sq mi)
- Time zone: UTC+01:00 (CET)
  - Summer (DST): UTC+02:00 (CEST)
- INSEE/Postal code: 86152 /86460
- ^{1} French Land Register data, which excludes lakes, ponds, glaciers > 1 km^{2} (0.386 sq mi or 247 acres) and river estuaries.

Mauprévoir (French pronunciation: [mopʁevwaʁ]) is a commune in the Vienne department in the Nouvelle-Aquitaine region in western France.

== See also ==
- Communes of the Vienne department
