= Payroux =

- Commune
- Location of Payroux
- Location within France Location within Nouvelle-Aquitaine
- Coordinates: 46°12′58″N 0°29′09″E
- Country: France
- Region: Nouvelle-Aquitaine
- Department: Vienne
- Arrondissement: Montmorillon
- Canton: Civray
- Intercommunality: Civraisien en Poitou

Government
  - Mayor (2020–2026): Sylvie Coquilleau
- Area^{1}: 30.05 km^{2} (11.60 sq mi)
- Elevation: 150 m (490 ft)
- Highest elevation: 167 m (548 ft)
- Lowest elevation: 125 m (410 ft)
- Population (2023): 461
  - Density: 15.3/km^{2} (39.7/sq mi)
- Time zone: UTC+01:00 (CET)
  - Summer (DST): UTC+02:00 (CEST)
- INSEE/Postal code: 86189 /86350
- ^{1} French Land Register data, which excludes lakes, ponds, glaciers > 1 km^{2} (0.386 sq mi or 247 acres) and river estuaries.

Payroux (French pronunciation: [pɛʁu]) is a commune in the Vienne department in the Nouvelle-Aquitaine region in western France.

== See also ==
- Communes of the Vienne department
