= Asnois, Vienne =

Asnois
- Commune
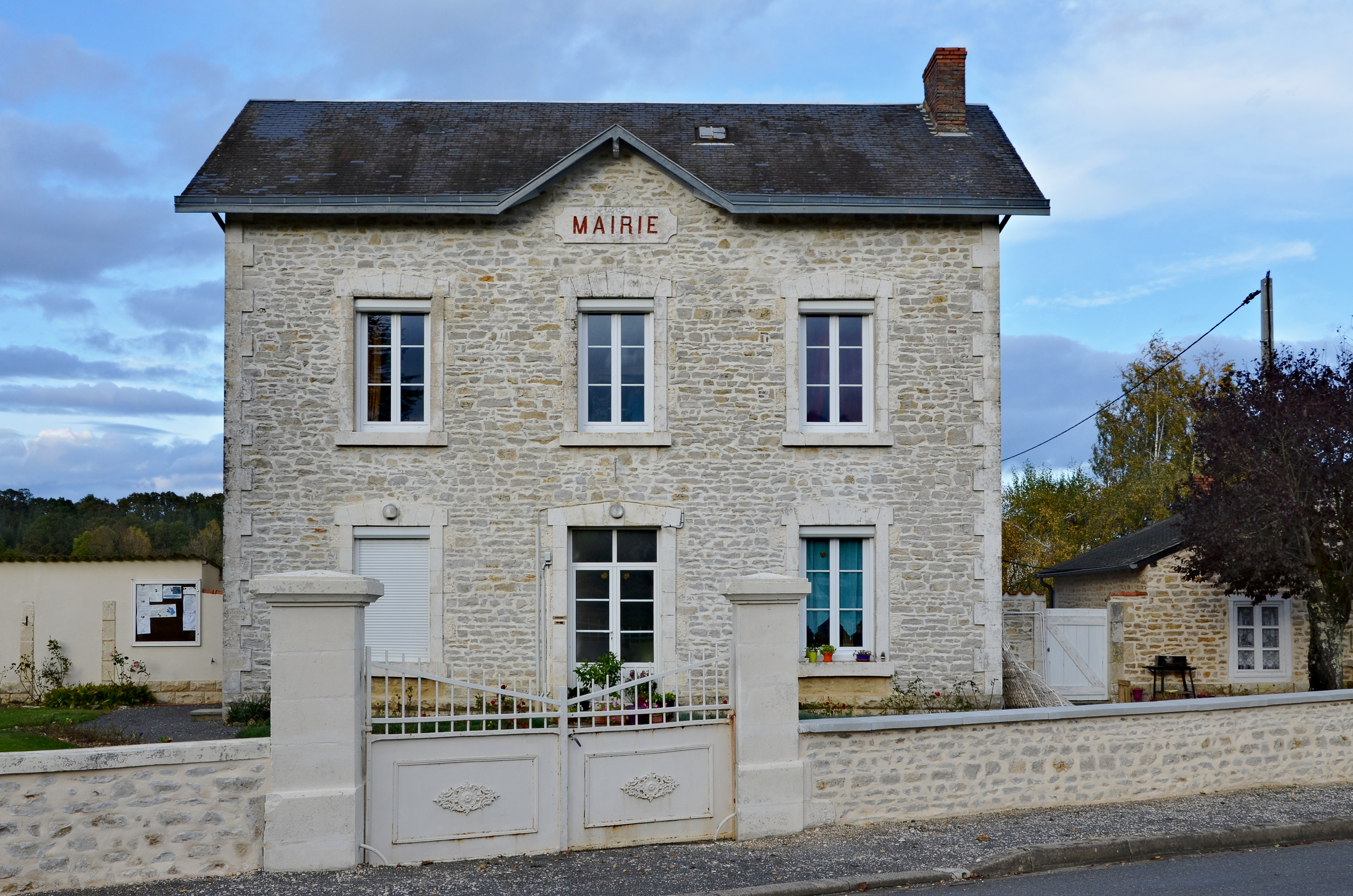
- The town hall in Asnois
- Location of Asnois
- Location within France Location within Nouvelle-Aquitaine
- Coordinates: 46°06′47″N 0°24′49″E
- Country: France
- Region: Nouvelle-Aquitaine
- Department: Vienne
- Arrondissement: Montmorillon
- Canton: Civray
- Intercommunality: CC Civraisien Poitou

Government
  - Mayor (2020–2026): Thierry Neel
- Area^{1}: 16.26 km^{2} (6.28 sq mi)
- Elevation: 160 m (520 ft)
- Highest elevation: 182 m (597 ft)
- Lowest elevation: 120 m (390 ft)
- Population (2023): 129
  - Density: 7.93/km^{2} (20.5/sq mi)
- Time zone: UTC+01:00 (CET)
  - Summer (DST): UTC+02:00 (CEST)
- INSEE/Postal code: 86012 /86250
- ^{1} French Land Register data, which excludes lakes, ponds, glaciers > 1 km^{2} (0.386 sq mi or 247 acres) and river estuaries.

Asnois (French pronunciation: [anwa]) is a commune in the Vienne department in the Nouvelle-Aquitaine region in western France.

== See also ==
- Communes of the Vienne department
