= La Chapelle-Bâton, Vienne =

La Chapelle-Bâton
- Commune
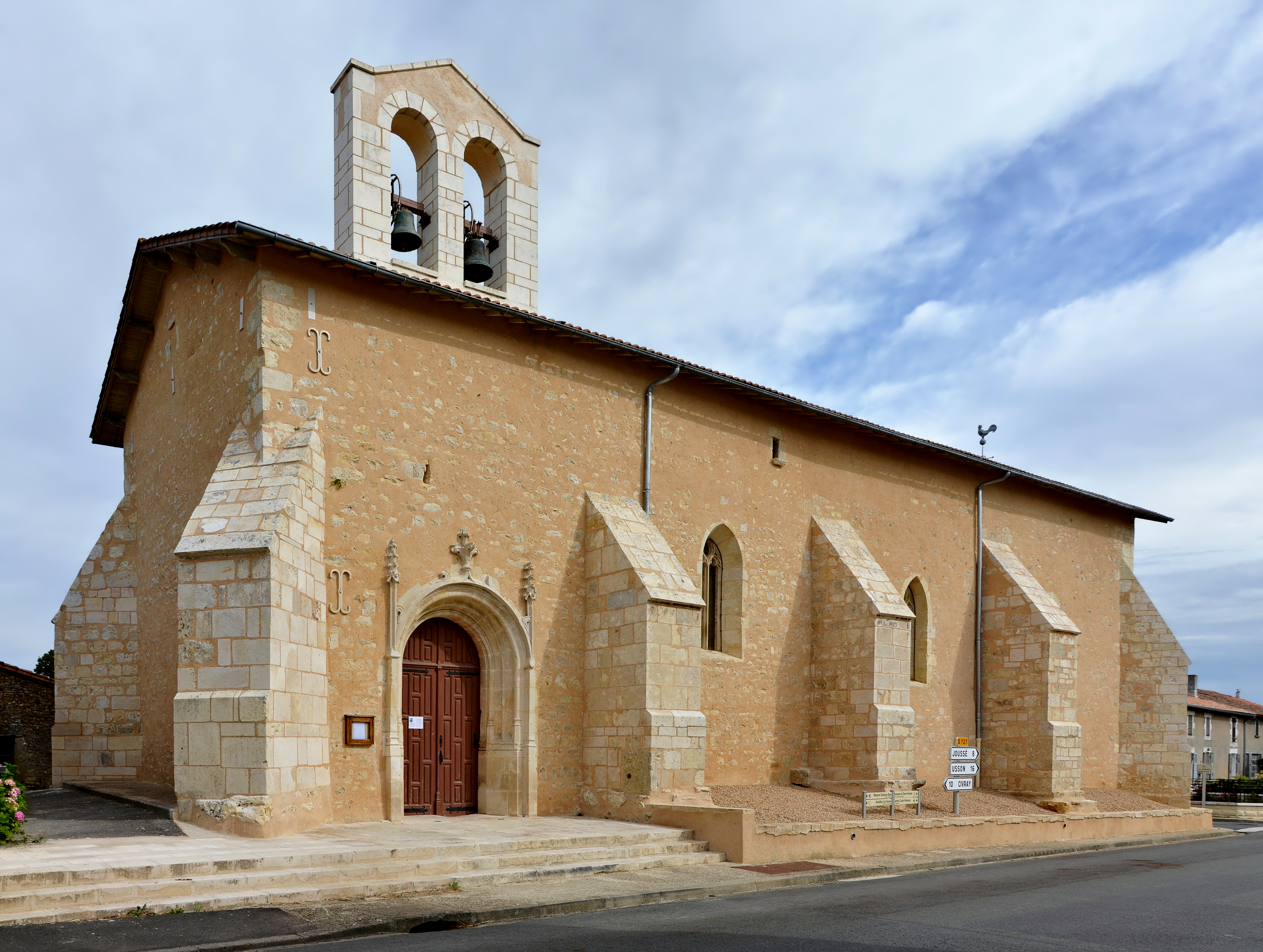
- The church in La Chapelle-Bâton
- Location of La Chapelle-Bâton
- Location within France Location within Nouvelle-Aquitaine
- Coordinates: 46°11′11″N 0°23′42″E
- Country: France
- Region: Nouvelle-Aquitaine
- Department: Vienne
- Arrondissement: Montmorillon
- Canton: Civray

Government
  - Mayor (2020–2026): Jean-Michel Mercier
- Area^{1}: 29.68 km^{2} (11.46 sq mi)
- Elevation: 149 m (489 ft)
- Highest elevation: 165 m (541 ft)
- Lowest elevation: 142 m (466 ft)
- Population (2023): 354
  - Density: 11.9/km^{2} (30.9/sq mi)
- Time zone: UTC+01:00 (CET)
  - Summer (DST): UTC+02:00 (CEST)
- INSEE/Postal code: 86055 /86250
- ^{1} French Land Register data, which excludes lakes, ponds, glaciers > 1 km^{2} (0.386 sq mi or 247 acres) and river estuaries.

La Chapelle-Bâton (French pronunciation: [la ʃapɛl batɔ̃]) is a commune in the Vienne department in the Nouvelle-Aquitaine region in western France. It is 8 km northeast from Civray. In the mid to late 1990s it was one of the communes in France where, with the support of the local community, test drilling was carried out in an effort to create an underground nuclear waste storage/processing facility. After it was found to be geologically unsuitable, plans were subsequently abandoned.

== See also ==
- Communes of the Vienne department
