= Champagné-le-Sec =

- Commune
- Location of Champagné-le-Sec
- Location within France Location within Nouvelle-Aquitaine
- Coordinates: 46°11′28″N 0°11′32″E
- Country: France
- Region: Nouvelle-Aquitaine
- Department: Vienne
- Arrondissement: Montmorillon
- Canton: Civray
- Intercommunality: Civraisien en Poitou

Government
  - Mayor (2020–2026): Michaël Ecalle
- Area^{1}: 7.99 km^{2} (3.08 sq mi)
- Elevation: 131 m (430 ft)
- Highest elevation: 144 m (472 ft)
- Lowest elevation: 126 m (413 ft)
- Population (2023): 215
  - Density: 26.9/km^{2} (69.7/sq mi)
- Time zone: UTC+01:00 (CET)
  - Summer (DST): UTC+02:00 (CEST)
- INSEE/Postal code: 86051 /86510
- ^{1} French Land Register data, which excludes lakes, ponds, glaciers > 1 km^{2} (0.386 sq mi or 247 acres) and river estuaries.

Champagné-le-Sec (French pronunciation: [ʃɑ̃paɲe lə sɛk]) is a commune in the Vienne department in the Nouvelle-Aquitaine region in western France.

== See also ==
- Communes of the Vienne department
