= Chatain =

- Commune
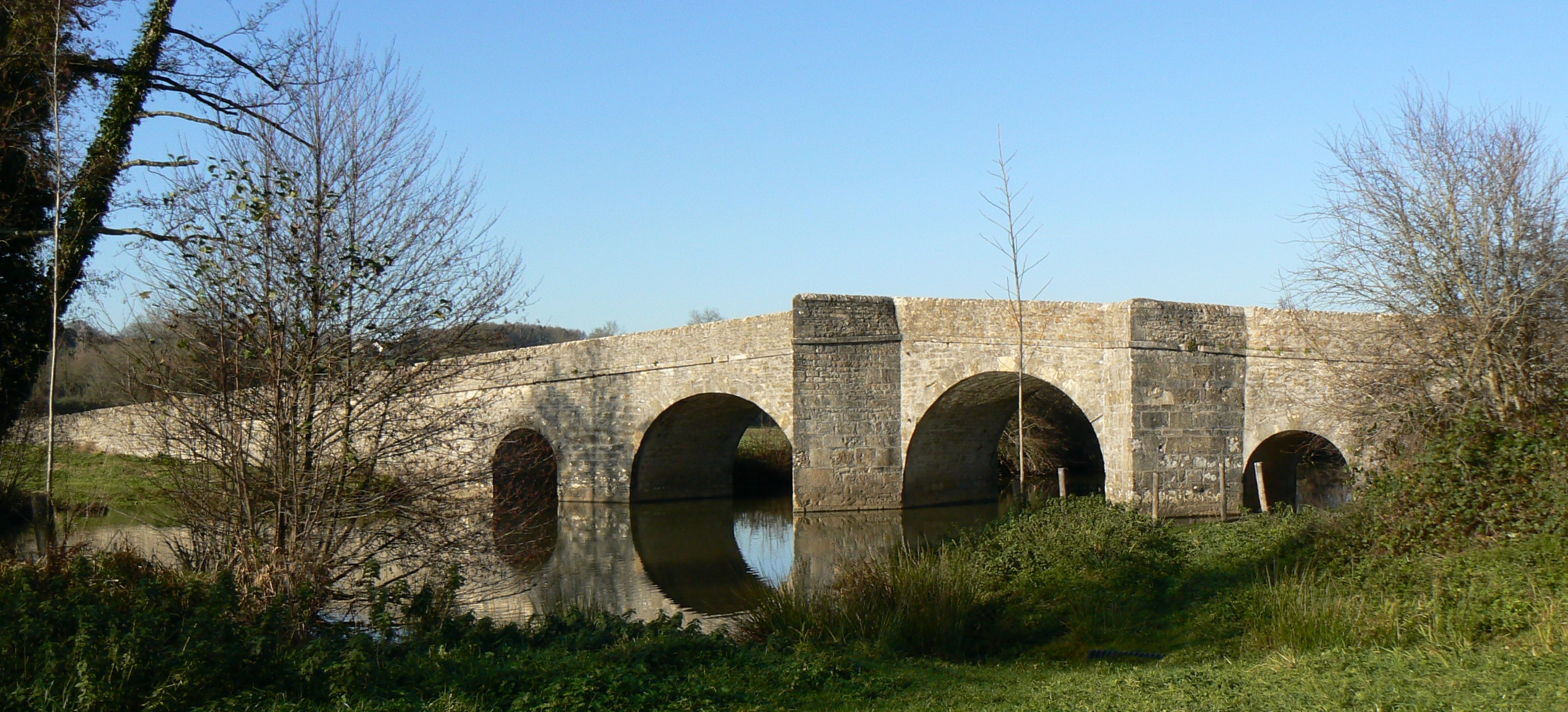
- Bridge over the Charente
- Location of Chatain
- Location within France Location within Nouvelle-Aquitaine
- Coordinates: 46°04′28″N 0°25′58″E
- Country: France
- Region: Nouvelle-Aquitaine
- Department: Vienne
- Arrondissement: Montmorillon
- Canton: Civray

Government
  - Mayor (2020–2026): Patricia Chaumillon
- Area^{1}: 22.05 km^{2} (8.51 sq mi)
- Highest elevation: 193 m (633 ft)
- Lowest elevation: 125 m (410 ft)
- Population (2023): 240
  - Density: 11/km^{2} (28/sq mi)
- Time zone: UTC+01:00 (CET)
  - Summer (DST): UTC+02:00 (CEST)
- INSEE/Postal code: 86063 /86250
- ^{1} French Land Register data, which excludes lakes, ponds, glaciers > 1 km^{2} (0.386 sq mi or 247 acres) and river estuaries.

Chatain (French pronunciation: [ʃatɛ̃]) is a commune in the Vienne department in the Nouvelle-Aquitaine region in western France.

== Geography ==
Chatain is a rural commune in the Vienne department of Nouvelle‑Aquitaine, located in the southwest corner of the department, about 10 km southwest of Charroux and along the Charente River. Covering 22.05 km², the terrain varies in elevation from 125 m to 193 m, with the town hall situated at approximately 166 m above sea level. Its landscape comprises bocage and valley systems characteristic of the Charente-Limousine region, dotted with small lakes and rare aquatic bird habitats. Situated outside any urban agglomeration with a sparse population (around 250–300 residents), Chatain has a low density of approximately 11–14 inhabitants per km².

== See also ==
- Communes of the Vienne department
