= Voulême =

- Commune
- Location of Voulême
- Location within France Location within Nouvelle-Aquitaine
- Coordinates: 46°06′00″N 0°13′56″E
- Country: France
- Region: Nouvelle-Aquitaine
- Department: Vienne
- Arrondissement: Montmorillon
- Canton: Civray
- Intercommunality: Civraisien en Poitou

Government
  - Mayor (2020–2026): Alain Fonteneau
- Area^{1}: 11.12 km^{2} (4.29 sq mi)
- Elevation: 127 m (417 ft)
- Highest elevation: 167 m (548 ft)
- Lowest elevation: 92 m (302 ft)
- Population (2023): 390
  - Density: 35/km^{2} (91/sq mi)
- Time zone: UTC+01:00 (CET)
  - Summer (DST): UTC+02:00 (CEST)
- INSEE/Postal code: 86295 /86400
- ^{1} French Land Register data, which excludes lakes, ponds, glaciers > 1 km^{2} (0.386 sq mi or 247 acres) and river estuaries.

Voulême (French pronunciation: [vulɛm]) is a commune in the Vienne department in the Nouvelle-Aquitaine region in western France.

== See also ==
- Communes of the Vienne department
