= Saint-Pierre-d'Exideuil =

- Commune
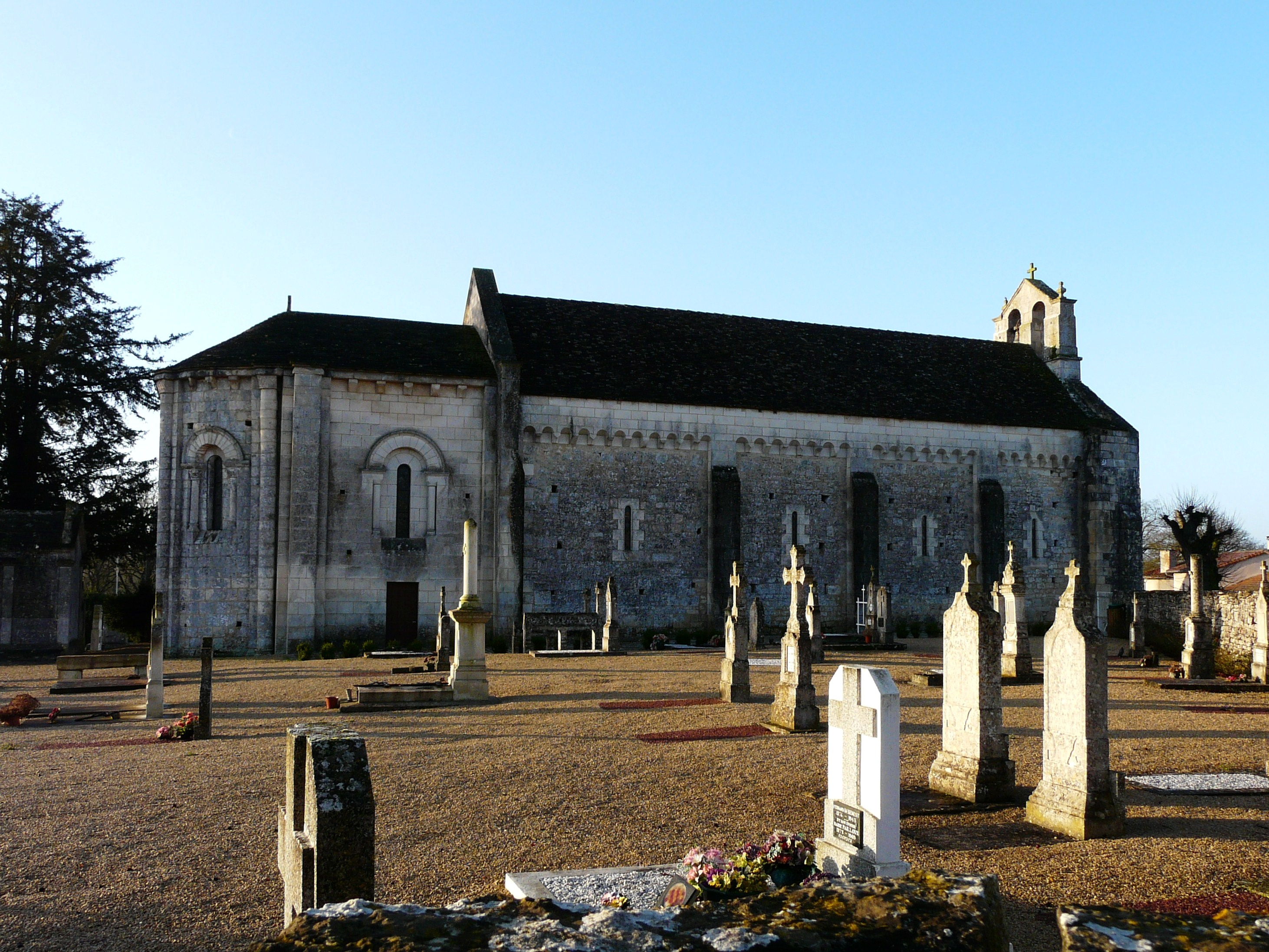
- The church of Saint-Pierre and the graveyard
- Location of Saint-Pierre-d'Exideuil
- Location within France Location within Nouvelle-Aquitaine
- Coordinates: 46°09′06″N 0°16′15″E
- Country: France
- Region: Nouvelle-Aquitaine
- Department: Vienne
- Arrondissement: Montmorillon
- Canton: Civray

Government
  - Mayor (2020–2026): Jean-Marie Peigné
- Area^{1}: 19.32 km^{2} (7.46 sq mi)
- Elevation: 130 m (430 ft)
- Highest elevation: 147 m (482 ft)
- Lowest elevation: 100 m (330 ft)
- Population (2023): 717
  - Density: 37.1/km^{2} (96.1/sq mi)
- Time zone: UTC+01:00 (CET)
  - Summer (DST): UTC+02:00 (CEST)
- INSEE/Postal code: 86237 /86400
- ^{1} French Land Register data, which excludes lakes, ponds, glaciers > 1 km^{2} (0.386 sq mi or 247 acres) and river estuaries.

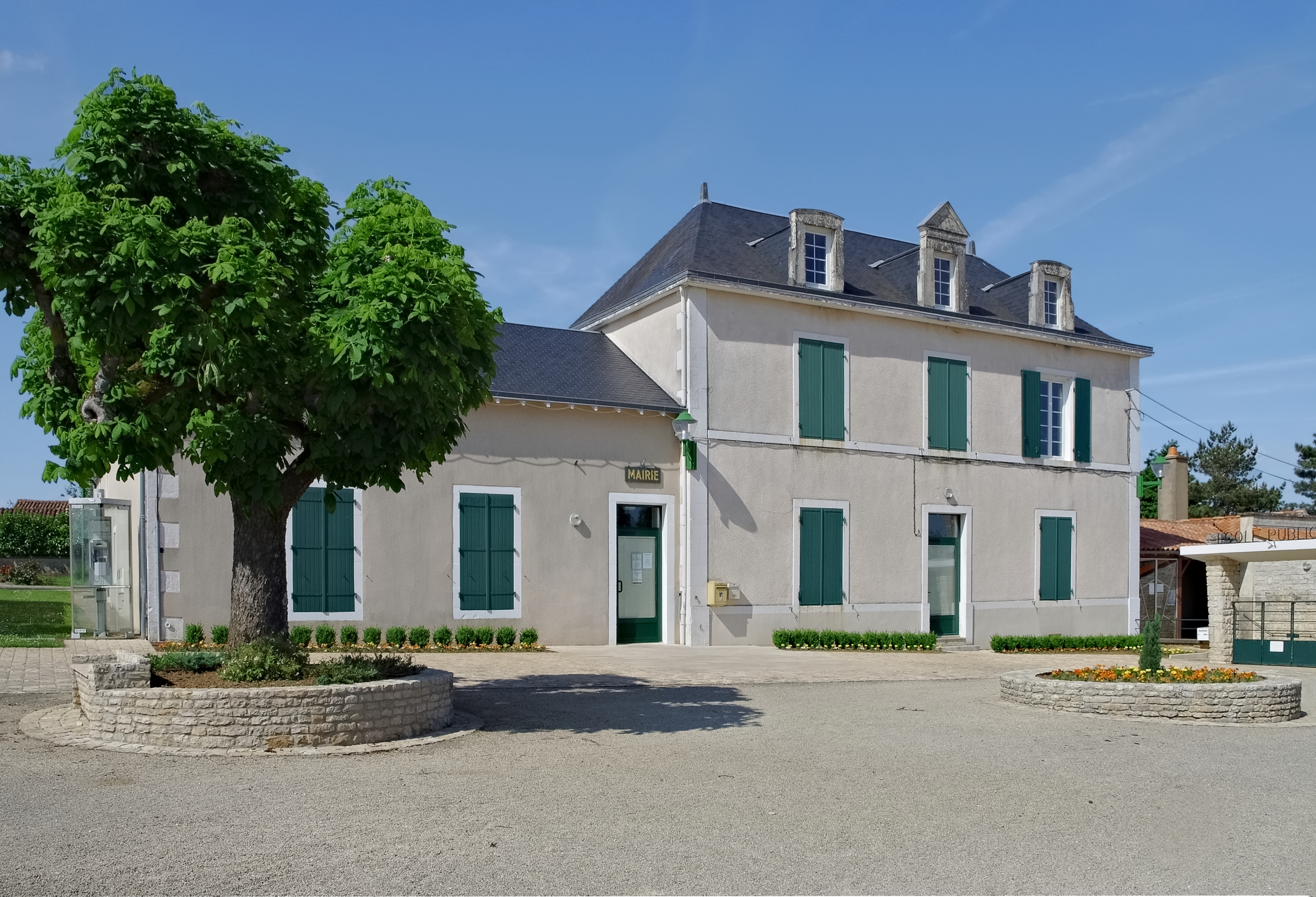
Town hall

Saint-Pierre-d'Exideuil (French pronunciation: [sɛ̃ pjɛʁ dɛksidœj]) is a commune in the Vienne department in the Nouvelle-Aquitaine region in western France.

== See also ==
- Communes of the Vienne department
