= Saint-Gaudent =

- Commune
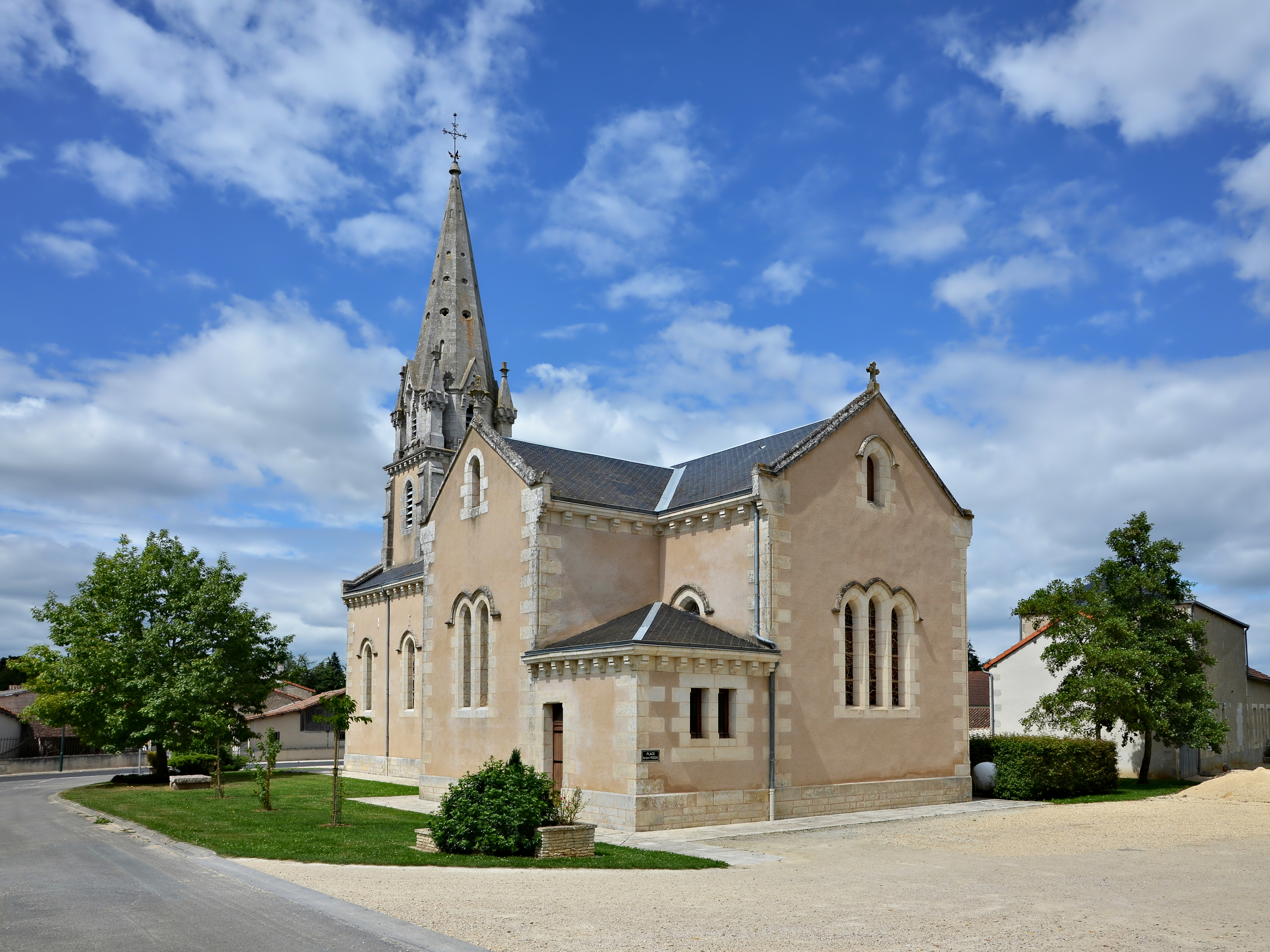
- The church in Saint-Gaudent
- Location of Saint-Gaudent
- Location within France Location within Nouvelle-Aquitaine
- Coordinates: 46°07′00″N 0°17′24″E
- Country: France
- Region: Nouvelle-Aquitaine
- Department: Vienne
- Arrondissement: Montmorillon
- Canton: Civray
- Intercommunality: Civraisien en Poitou

Government
  - Mayor (2020–2026): Josette Colas
- Area^{1}: 11.76 km^{2} (4.54 sq mi)
- Elevation: 145 m (476 ft)
- Highest elevation: 153 m (502 ft)
- Lowest elevation: 113 m (371 ft)
- Population (2023): 303
  - Density: 25.8/km^{2} (66.7/sq mi)
- Time zone: UTC+01:00 (CET)
  - Summer (DST): UTC+02:00 (CEST)
- INSEE/Postal code: 86220 /86400
- ^{1} French Land Register data, which excludes lakes, ponds, glaciers > 1 km^{2} (0.386 sq mi or 247 acres) and river estuaries.

Saint-Gaudent (French pronunciation: [sɛ̃ ɡodɑ̃]) is a commune in the Vienne department in the Nouvelle-Aquitaine region in western France.

== See also ==
- Communes of the Vienne department
