= Champniers, Vienne =

Champniers
- Commune
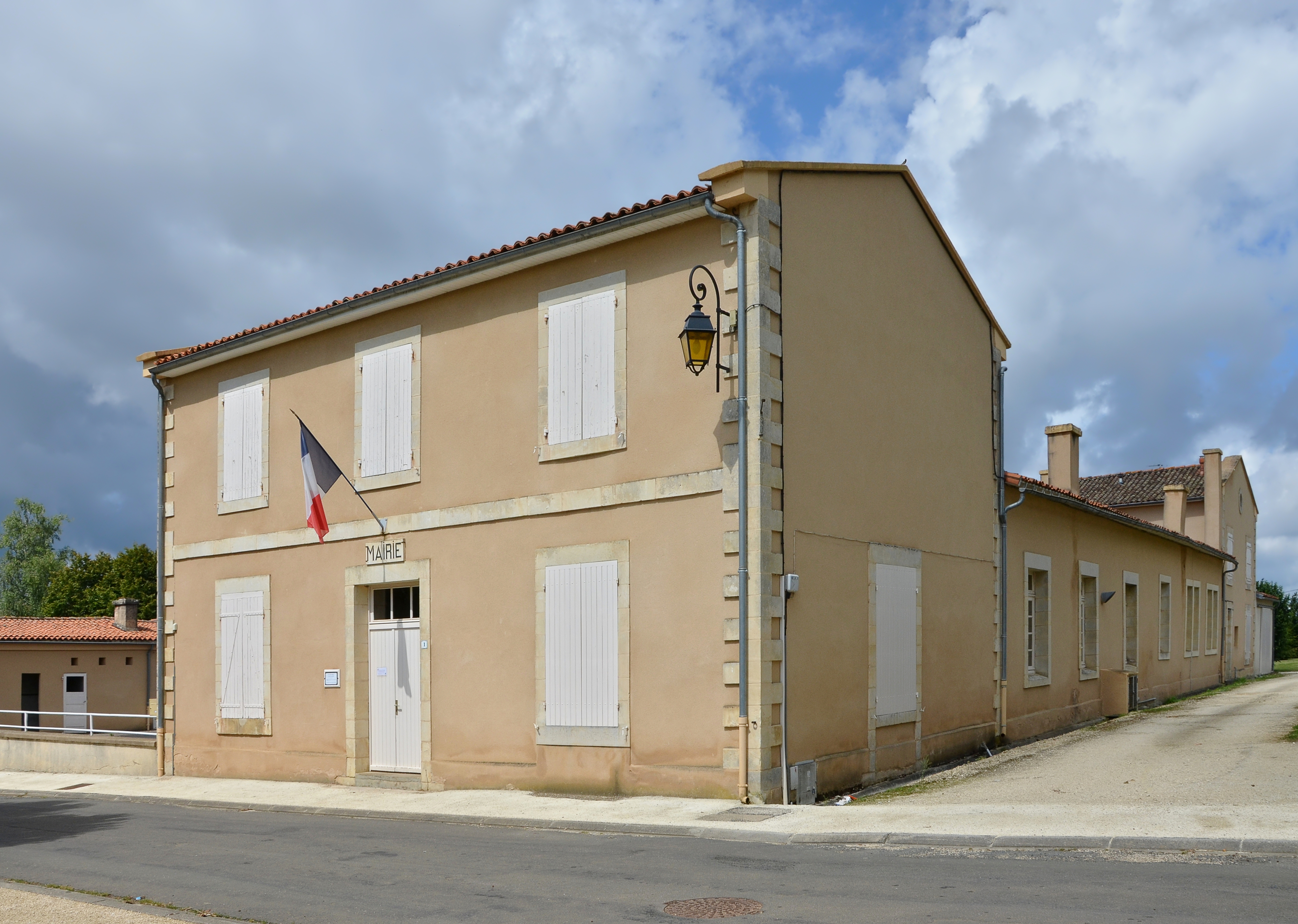
- Champniers town hall
- Location of Champniers
- Location within France Location within Nouvelle-Aquitaine
- Coordinates: 46°13′07″N 0°20′16″E
- Country: France
- Region: Nouvelle-Aquitaine
- Department: Vienne
- Arrondissement: Montmorillon
- Canton: Civray

Government
  - Mayor (2020–2026): Jean-Olivier Geoffroy
- Area^{1}: 20.03 km^{2} (7.73 sq mi)
- Elevation: 148 m (486 ft)
- Highest elevation: 157 m (515 ft)
- Lowest elevation: 124 m (407 ft)
- Population (2023): 358
  - Density: 17.9/km^{2} (46.3/sq mi)
- Time zone: UTC+01:00 (CET)
  - Summer (DST): UTC+02:00 (CEST)
- INSEE/Postal code: 86054 /86400
- ^{1} French Land Register data, which excludes lakes, ponds, glaciers > 1 km^{2} (0.386 sq mi or 247 acres) and river estuaries.

Champniers (French pronunciation: [ʃɑ̃nje]) is a commune in the Vienne department in the Nouvelle-Aquitaine region in western France.

== See also ==
- Communes of the Vienne department
