= Canton of Civray =

Coordinates: 46.15°N 0.30°E

The canton of Civray is an administrative division of the Vienne department, western France. Its borders were modified at the French canton reorganisation which came into effect in March 2015. Its seat is in Civray.

It consists of the following communes:

1. Asnois
2. Availles-Limouzine
3. Blanzay
4. Champagné-le-Sec
5. Champagné-Saint-Hilaire
6. Champniers
7. La Chapelle-Bâton
8. Charroux
9. Chatain
10. Château-Garnier
11. Civray
12. La Ferrière-Airoux
13. Genouillé
14. Joussé
15. Linazay
16. Lizant
17. Magné
18. Mauprévoir
19. Payroux
20. Pressac
21. Saint-Gaudent
22. Saint-Martin-l'Ars
23. Saint-Pierre-d'Exideuil
24. Saint-Romain
25. Savigné
26. Sommières-du-Clain
27. Surin
28. Val-de-Comporté
29. Voulême
