= Saint-Romain, Vienne =

Saint-Romain
- Commune
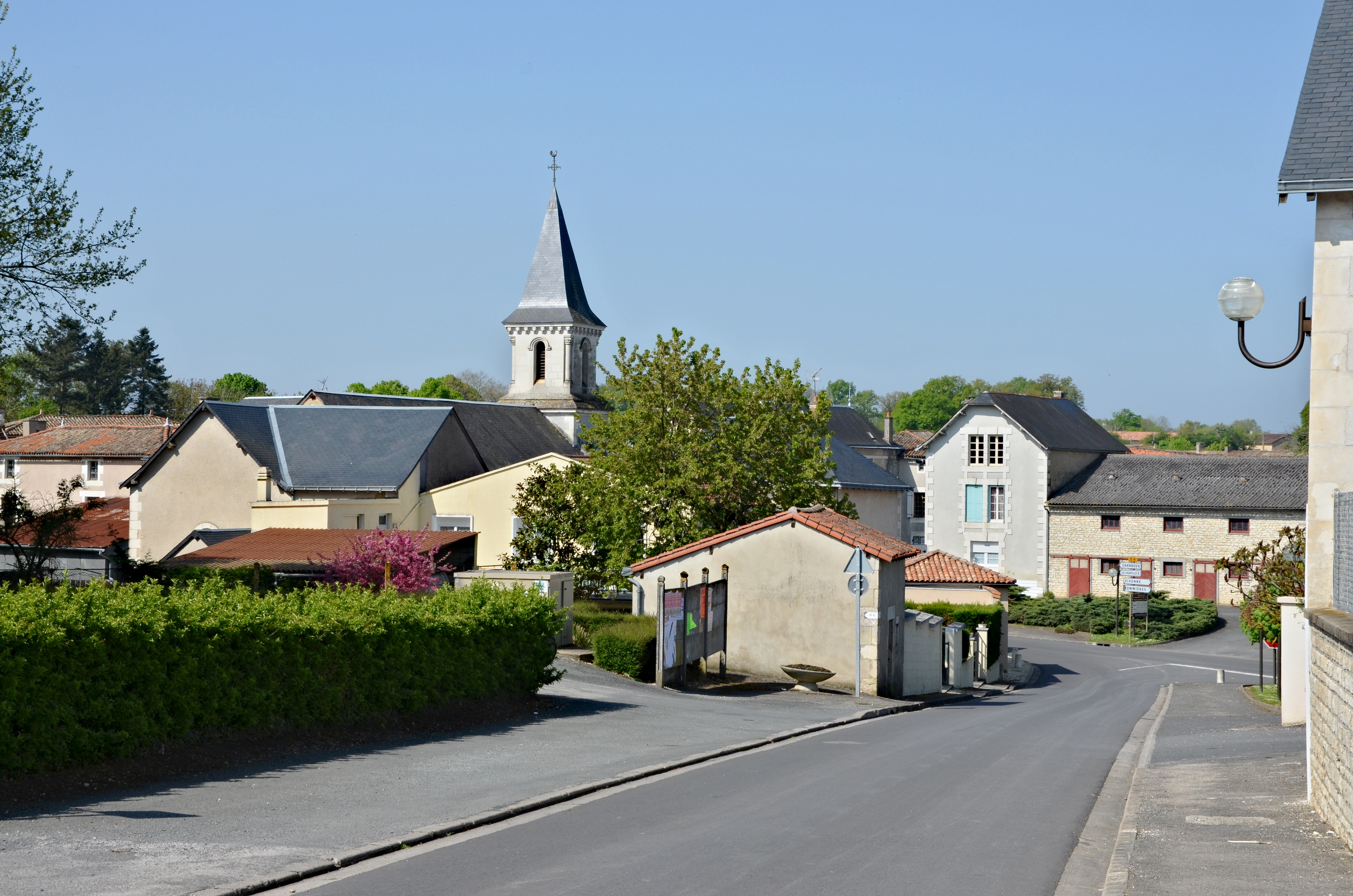
- A view of the village from the school
- Location of Saint-Romain
- Location within France Location within Nouvelle-Aquitaine
- Coordinates: 46°13′23″N 0°21′59″E
- Country: France
- Region: Nouvelle-Aquitaine
- Department: Vienne
- Arrondissement: Châtellerault
- Canton: Civray

Government
  - Mayor (2020–2026): Jacky Beau
- Area^{1}: 20.48 km^{2} (7.91 sq mi)
- Highest elevation: 159 m (522 ft)
- Lowest elevation: 119 m (390 ft)
- Population (2023): 386
  - Density: 18.8/km^{2} (48.8/sq mi)
- Time zone: UTC+01:00 (CET)
  - Summer (DST): UTC+02:00 (CEST)
- INSEE/Postal code: 86242 /86250
- ^{1} French Land Register data, which excludes lakes, ponds, glaciers > 1 km^{2} (0.386 sq mi or 247 acres) and river estuaries.

Saint-Romain (French pronunciation: [sɛ̃ ʁɔmɛ̃]; also called Saint-Romain-en-Charroux) is a commune in the Vienne department in the Nouvelle-Aquitaine region in western France.

== See also ==
- Communes of the Vienne department
