= Civray, Vienne =

Civray
- Commune
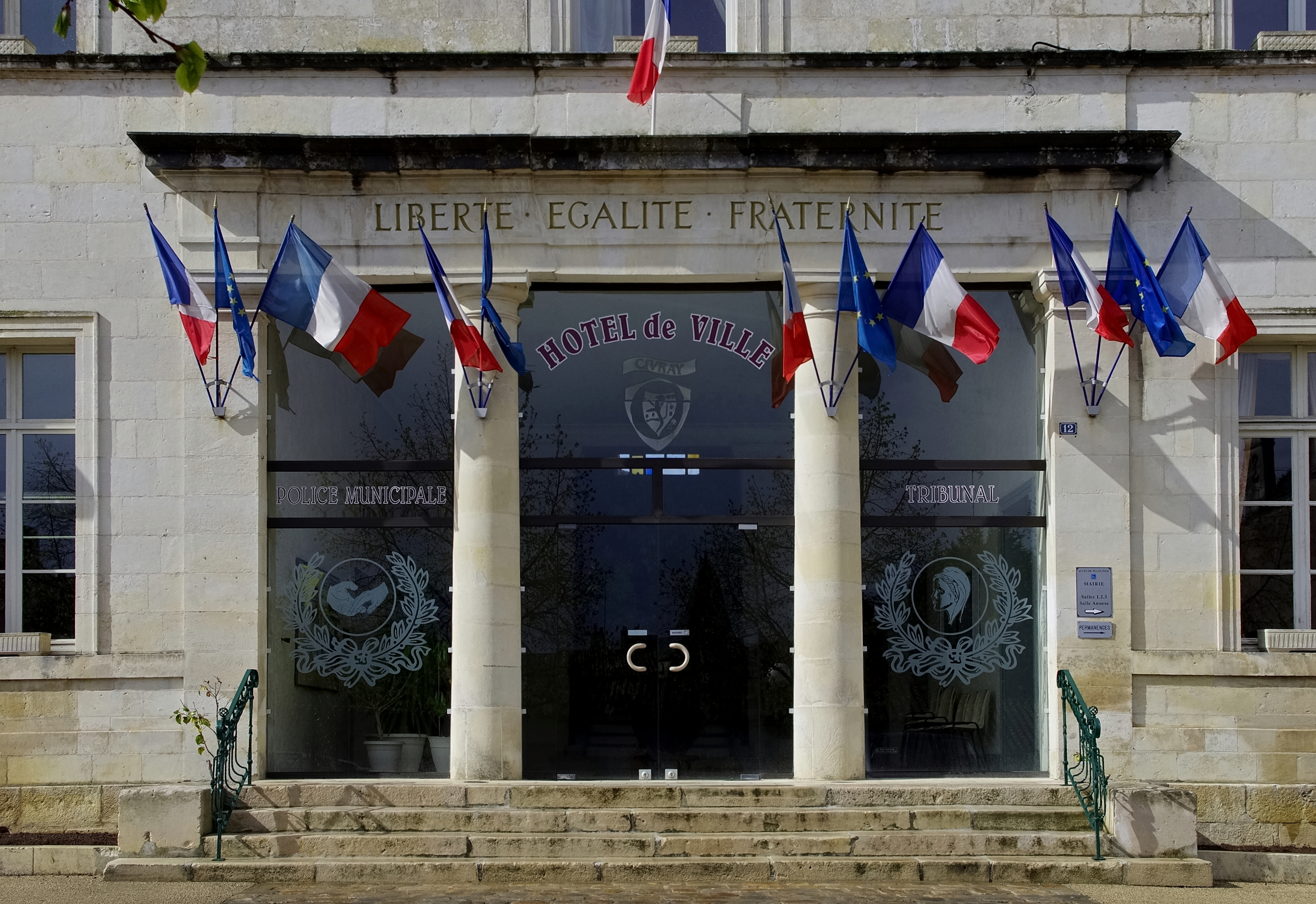
- The entrance to Civray town hall

- Coat of arms
- Location of Civray
- Location within France Location within Nouvelle-Aquitaine
- Coordinates: 46°09′09″N 0°17′39″E
- Country: France
- Region: Nouvelle-Aquitaine
- Department: Vienne
- Arrondissement: Montmorillon
- Canton: Civray
- Intercommunality: Civraisien en Poitou

Government
  - Mayor (2022–2026): Emmanuel Brunet
- Area^{1}: 8.70 km^{2} (3.36 sq mi)
- Elevation: 137 m (449 ft)
- Highest elevation: 157 m (515 ft)
- Lowest elevation: 105 m (344 ft)
- Population (2023): 2,522
  - Density: 290/km^{2} (751/sq mi)
- Time zone: UTC+01:00 (CET)
  - Summer (DST): UTC+02:00 (CEST)
- INSEE/Postal code: 86078 /86400
- ^{1} French Land Register data, which excludes lakes, ponds, glaciers > 1 km^{2} (0.386 sq mi or 247 acres) and river estuaries.

Civray (French pronunciation: [sivʁɛ]) is a commune in the Vienne department and Nouvelle-Aquitaine region of western France.

== Population ==
Historical population
Year	Pop.	±% p.a.
1968	3,034	—
1975	3,108	+0.34%
1982	2,978	−0.61%
1990	2,814	−0.71%
1999	2,638	−0.72%
2007	2,819	+0.83%
2012	2,900	+0.57%
2017	2,658	−1.73%
2023	2,522	−0.87%
Source: INSEE

== See also ==
- Communes of the Vienne department
