= Château de Ranton =

Castle in Nouvelle-Aquitaine, France

Coordinates: 47°0′2″N 0°1′45″W

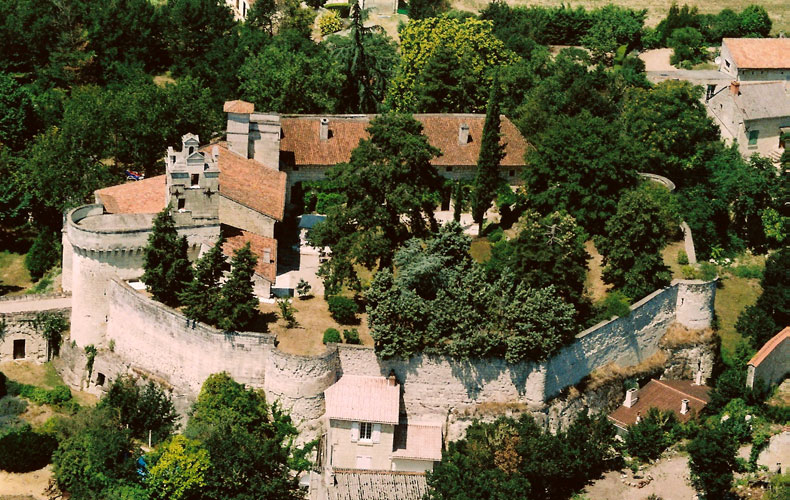

The Château de Ranton is a small fortified castle in the village of Ranton, in the Department of the Vienne just west of Loudun, and south of the Loire. It was one of the front line of fortresses which were built to defend the royal city of Loundun at the beginning of the Hundred Years' War in 1340–1345. It played this military role until 1372. It then became a feudal manor and one of the estates of aristocratic families associated with the Courts of the French Kings and the Dukes of Anjou.

The buildings inside the main rampart wall were rebuilt in the 16th century in the Renaissance style, as the home of a series of Protestant families in the French Wars of Religion. It escaped destruction both by Cardinal Richelieu in the early 17th century and again in the French Revolution, but was little more than a ruin by the 1940s.

It has been restored in three phases since 1950, and now is one of the most complete fortresses of the 14th century.

== Architecture ==
The castle overlooks and dominates the valley of the Dive, and was one of a string of fortresses along the limestone ridge. It is an octagonal fortress, surrounded by a dry moat. It was probably built on a previous fortress, and follows a typical Templar design.

The main rampart walls are built of squared blocks of "tuffeau", the local soft limestone, excavated from the dry moat. The walls are built directly on the limestone outcrop and rise to a height of about 8–10 metres above the moat. The moat itself is excavated about 3–4 metres into the underlying limestone, and was originally protected by an outer wall. This has now disappeared, the stones having been reused to build the village houses.

The walls are protected on the eight corners by semicircular towers. The towers originally all had machicolations, the overhanging part around the top of the towers, which was a recent innovation in military architecture of the time, and made it even more difficult to scale the walls. The change from square to round towers also gave better resistance to cannonballs. The machicolations now only remain on the tower to the right of the main entrance.

The main gate was protected by two larger towers, and access was by a fixed stone bridge across the moat, but with a drawbridge on the last 3 metres. It was replaced by an extension of the fixed bridge in the 17th century. The main entrance is vaulted in the Plantagenet style, with stables and guard rooms to right and left, and the entrance to the vaulted spiral staircase in the main tower.

The buildings in the courtyard date from the 14th and 17th centuries: The vaulted store rooms and granary on the south-west side are part of the original 14th-century construction. Those on the north-west side are from the 17th century, built against the original inner fortification wall. The buildings on the north-east and south-east were already ruined in the 17th century, and their foundations are now part of the embankment to the ramparts.

Excavation of the moat into the limestone gave access to a limestone wall into which homes and farm buildings were excavated – both under the castle and under the outer wall. The latter were extended into a substantial underground village in the 14th century as a safe haven from the pillaging bands that roamed the countryside in the period from 1356 to 1372. Many of the rooms around the moat were inhabited well into the 19th century, and some were still inhabited in the 1920s, within living memory of people in the village.

In 1900, the population of Ranton still numbered about 600, mainly engaged in viticulture and stone extraction. The miners, known as "pions", still used traditional methods, using wetted wooden stakes to break off blocks, and their unfinished work is still visible in some of the excavations around the moat.

== The Hundred Years' War ==
The area around Loudun was the focus of attention in the Hundred Years' War. In January 1340, Edward III of England formally claimed the title of 'King of France'. In June, the English fleet decimated the French fleet at the mouth of the Zwin in what is now the Netherlands. The war had begun. It was initially fought in the north of France and the Netherlands, but it was Aquitaine that was at stake. After four generations of peace in the area, the castles and town walls were in a poor state of repair.

In 1340 the castles at Ranton and Curçay-sur-Dive were rebuilt; that of Ranton by Guillaume de Bois Gourmont and that at Curçay by Huet Odart, both under instructions from Jean II; they were part of an elaborate network of fortresses that ensured that the area remained under French control. The castle at Ranton was only one of those rebuilt by Guillaume de Bois Gourmont: the largest was that at Bois Gourmont, near Veniers, just north of Loudun, of which only the ruined keep now remains.

In 1345, Jeanne Gourmont, daughter of Guillaume de Bois Gourmont married Jean de la Jaille. The castle and estates of Ranton were part of Jeanne's dowry, and Jean de la Jaille became the Lord of Ranton. He was already an experienced and valued knight: he had been born in 1324 and brought up in a privileged environment in which the values of medieval chivalry dominated. He first appeared in the rolls of the King's army at the age of 16 when he is recorded as leading a troop of three young squires to join the army in Flanders. He first saw action at the head of a troop of twenty soldiers at the Battle of Saint-Omer on 24 June 1340 between an Anglo-Flemish army commanded by Robert III of Artois and the French under Eudes IV, Duke of Burgundy.

In 1354, Louis I, Duke of Anjou was appointed as the Governor of Tourraine and Jean de la Jaille joined his service. In 1355, Jean was in the entourage of Jean de Clermont, Maréchal de France and Lieutenant General to the King in Touraine and Poitou, one of the most powerful and brilliant Barons in the Court of Jean le Bon. He was fortunate to escape with his life at the Battle of Poitiers in 1356. Jean de la Jaille remained in the service of Louis I of Anjou, and was nominated Captain and Defender of Loudun in 1360, a function he fulfilled with honour and success for over 30 years.

Poitiers itself was taken by the English in 1360, and was only recaptured by the French under Bertrand du Guesclin in 1370. During this period, Loudun and its network of fortresses was the frontier between the English and French controlled areas. There were periodic skirmishes between English and French forces, not to mention problems with lawless bands, discharged soldiers and booty seekers. Jean de la Jaille twice saved Loudun from occupation and pillage.

In the late 1360s, the English captured the castle at Moncontour and controlled the valley of the Dive. Only the network of fortresses around Loudun held out. In 1369, John Chandos and Lord Pembroke combined forces and again besieged Loudun. They occupied the town, but Jean de la Jaille held out in the citadel in the face of a torrent of fire. The countryside suffered terribly. The area north of Loudun, around Roiffe, was particularly badly affected. It was some decades before the villages were re-established, and the land brought back under cultivation. Many of the excavated rooms off the dry moat around the Chateau de Ranton date from this time. They served as a refuge for the villagers.

Jeanne Gourmont died in 1373 and is buried in the Church of Saint-Croix in Loudun. The titles she brought to Jean de la Jaille on their marriage notably that of Lord of Ranton, passed to her eldest son, Tristan III de la Jaille. Both her two sons, now seasoned knights, fought the English in Poitou and in Brittany. Tristan III led a company in which his brother, Guichard was his lieutenant, and he was lieutenant to his father, the governor of Loudun. In 1371, he had married Eleanor de Maille, daughter of the Lord de Breze. He was part of the Court of Louis I of Anjou, and was killed with him at Bari in 1384, and the title of Lord of Ranton passed to his eldest son, Tristan IV

In 1388, at the age of 14, Tristan IV left La Rochelle with other adventurous young squires to fight the Duke of Lancaster in Castille. In 1392 he joined the King at Le Mans and was one of the leading captains in the Angevin army. In 1409, he set out with Louis II of Anjou to unsuccessfully claim the Kingdom of Naples.

His uncle, Guichard did not have lands to tie him to France, and as soon as war with the English calmed during the 1380s, he left to fight in Hungary. In 1395, Guichard went on a crusade against the Ottoman Turks who had captured Constantinople. He was with the army defeated at the siege of Nicopolis in 1396. It took two years, and a great deal of ransom money to bring the survivors home. In 1399, he left with a second expedition led by marshal Jean II le Maingre to aid the Eastern Emperor, Manuel II. They sailed into the Golden Horn in 1399 with 1,400 men-at-arms to break the Turkish siege of Constantinople. They were besieged in Constantinople for two years. In a naval battle, Guichard de la Jaille was again noted in dispatches for his bravery and courage. He returned to France in 1405 and died the following year.

Jean de la Jaille had also died in 1405, at the age of 81. By then, he was "deaf, senile and infirm" and was ruined financially. His estates had been too often mortgaged to pay for his and his son's military adventures.

Tristan IV was made Grand Master of the Household of the King of Sicily. In 1425 he became Guard and Captain of the Château de Loudun. However, Tristan left again for Naples with King Louis in 1429. He participated in the victory of Aquila and was rewarded with the government of the region of Reggio. Louis never become effective King of Naples and died of malaria at Cosenza in 1434. The following year, his brother René of Anjou was named King of Naples. Tristan died in Reggio soon afterwards.

Tristan IV had three sons: Robert, the eldest was killed at Agincourt in 1415. The two younger ones, Bertrand and Chretien, followed their father to Sicily in 1409; Chretien stayed there to become the Grand Senechal to the Court of Louis II, the King of Sicily. Bertrand took part in three years of campaigning, culminating in the victory of Roccasecca in 1411, then returned to look after the estates in France. He was Lord of la Grande Jaille, east of Loudun, of Ranton, of Avrille in Anjou; of Beuxes; of La Roche-Talbot in Souvigne-sur-Sarthe; of la Balayere in the Bierne; of La Varenne-Bouzeau near to Moranne and others. He grew up at Ranton and it remained his mother's home until her death.

His childhood and youth at Ranton brought him into regular contact with his neighbours in the Château of Curcay. This was owned by the Odart family: a distinguished family, as famous as that of de la Jaille for their exploits in the crusades and against the English. In 1418, Bertrand married Guillemette, the daughter of Guillaume Odart.

In addition to his inherited estates, Louis XII of France made Bertrand de la Jaille the squire of his household, Counsellor and then Chamberlain to the Crown. In 1429, Bertrand de la Jaille succeeded his father as the captain-governor of the city of Loudun. The same year, a Commission of Doctors of Theology recognised Joan of Arc's mission to crown Charles VII of France was divinely inspired. In April, after Joan's recognition of Charles in Chinon, and to relieve the siege of Orléans, the King sent "Monseigneur de la Jaille" ahead of his forces. His second son, Pierre de la Jaille, born in 1419, was brought up as Page to the Arthur, Count of Richemont and was his Squire at the age of ten in 1429 when Arthur de Richemont came to the rescue of Joan of Arc. They were probably therefore involved in the most significant military action prior to Joan's arrival in late April outside Rouvray where a thousand French and Scottish soldiers attempted unsuccessfully to intercept and divert an English supply convoy in the Battle of the Herrings, so named because the convoy was carrying a large supply of fish for Lent. They also fought alongside Joan of Arc at the battle of Patay in 1429.

When, in 1440, the English returned to the offensive and reoccupied the southern part of Maine, it was Bertrand de la Jaille that joined forces with those of the occupied areas and forced an English retreat. In 1441, at the siege of Saint-Denis-d'Anjou, he was amongst the knights that "charged so vigorously that the first wave killed more than 200 and forced the remaining English forces to retreat".

After 1452, Bertrand passed most of his time at the Château de Roche-Talbot, his favourite residence in Souvigné-sur-Sarte, but frequently visited Ranton and his other estates in the area. His wife had use of the Château de Ranton through the marriage settlement and lived there until her death. She is buried in the family vault in the Church of the Ropemakers in Loudun. Bertrand died in 1456 at la Roche-Talbot and is buried in the Chapelle de Saint Roche at Souvigné-sur-Sarte. He had five children. The eldest, Philibert took over from his grandfather, Tristan IV, the title of Grand Master of the Household to the King of Sicily, but died before his father in 1456.

Pierre de la Jaille gained a reputation as a diplomat and courtier, rather than as a man of arms. He was caught up in the violence and intrigues that grew out of the jealousy between Richemont and Georges, the Count de Tremoille. However, he helped arrange the Treaty of Arras in 1435, which cemented the peace between France and Burgundy leading to the eventual defeat of the English.

== The Renaissance ==
The fourth son of Bertrand de la Jaille, Bertrand II, became Lord of Ranton and Avrille on the death of his father in 1456 and the remainder of the family estates on the death of Pierre in 1483 and Hardouin in 1493. Bertrand divided his time between the estates of Ranton, Beuxes and Avrille. He Married Catherine le Roy, daughter of Guillaume, Lord of Chavigny and Françoise of Fontenay. Louis XI appointed him as his "echanson aux gages" at a salary of 330 pounds a year in 1468, from when he was part of the Royal court at Montils-les-Tours, Amboise and other royal residences. In 1480, René of Anjou, nominal King of Naples and Sicily and titular King of Jerusalem, died. His death precipitated a new series of battles for succession in Italy. Bertrand II de la Jaille participated in the campaigns in Italy. He returned to France in 1496 and died the same year.

Bertrand II had eight children: René, Gilles, Madelon, Pierre, Jeanne, Marguerite, Isabelle and Françoise. As was usual in those days, the eldest son, Rene, inherited the titles of all the major estates. At this time these were La Roche-Morier, La Grande Jaille, de Beuxes, Ranton, La Jaille-en-Chahaigne, La Varenne, La Roche-Talbot and Souvigne. Rene married Jeanne Herisson in 1494. Rene de la Jaille was several times in court, accused of various misdemeanors, and died in 1515. He died a month after the battle of Marignan, and it is likely that he died of wounds.

Rene and Jeanne de la Jaille had two children; Rene II and Claude, but Rene I's death in 1515 left the estates in the care of his widow. Jeanne looked after them until her death in 1541. She remarried in 1518 with Gabriel de la Chatre, but her eldest son, Rene II, inherited the titles to the family estates. This was normal practice: the eldest son inherited all feudal titles from his father, the widow only being the regent for their management.

Rene II de la Jaille married Magdelaine de Montgomery, the sister of Gabriel, Comte de Montgomery in 1530. They had a single daughter - Françoise de la Jaille. She married Gabriel d'Apchon - linking two of the great feudal families. He took part in the Italian campaign in 1539 and was made a Knight of the King's Order, a rare and distinguished honour. By the 1550s, Rene II was a Knight of the Order of St Michael, Senechal of Anjou, and a Gentleman of the court of Catherine de' Medici. In 1555, he was captain general of the rear guard of the French forces. This had originally been an elite troupe, but was now little more than an undisciplined rabble of conscripts. In the campaign in Picardy against the Spanish, Rene was captured and ransomed for 20,000 ECU. This was a considerable sum and virtually ruined the family. He sold the estates in Anjou and most of those in the Loudun area: Ranton was one of the few estates he kept. He died two years later, still fighting - this time at the battle of St Quentin in 1557.

The title of Ranton, Bois Gourmond and Preaux passed to his son-in-law, Gabriel d'Apchon, Lord of Roche-Talbot and numerous other properties in the Loire and Auvergne. He had 5 children: 2 sons - Charles and Jacques; and 3 daughters - Dianne, Gabrielle and Marguerite.

== Ranton in the Wars of Religion ==
Charles d'Apchon inherited the castle and estates at Ranton in about 1580. He had married Françoise de Vendomois in 1576, but she died four years later. He married a second time in September 1581 with Louise de Châtillon d'Argenton. They had a daughter - Renee d'Apchon, and a son, Andre, born early in 1589. Charles was captain of a troop of about 50 men-at-arms, and was frequently in battles. In July 1589, he was killed in the assault of St Saturnin in the Auvergne. On his death, Louise, her daughter Renee and son Andre had their main residence at Roche-Talbot. She had considerable debts and great difficulties with managing her estates. In 1595, Louise married again - with Gilbert du Puy du Fou, also known as "de Commeronde", the second son of Rene du Puy du Fou. Andre took his mother's name of de Chastillon, and Louise retained the feudal rights to the estates of Ranton in her second marriage contract. Louise and Gilbert had a single daughter, Isalbelle. Gilbert died in 1609. Louise's first daughter, Renee died there in 1612, and Louise transferred the feudal rights for Roche-Talbot to her son-in-law, Jacques II de Beauvan du Rivau. She retained only Ranton, Bois Gourmont and Preaux, for which she re-swore allegiance to the King on 4 July 1613.

Her second daughter, Isabelle du Puy du Fou, inherited Ranton from her mother, and exercised the rights of "high, middle and low justice" in the manor until 1628. She was married (to Charles de la Touche), but he died in 1624, she retired to a nunnery in 1628, and died in 1631. On the death of his step-father, in 1625, Andre de Châtillon became Marquis d'Argenton, Lord of Moncontour, Bouville, La Jaille, Beuxes, Bois-Rouge and other estates. He became Lord of Ranton in 1628: His sister, Renee retired to her nunnery, and he married Marie Margerite Gouffier.

In 1631, the Château de Ranton was bought by Paul Aubin, a friend of Richelieu and nephew of the duc de Sully. He also acquired various estates in the area: Bourneuf, La Jaille and others. Throughout this turbulent time, the estates at Ranton were enjoying a new prosperity, and the main buildings around the Cour d’Honneur were remodeled in the Louis XIII style. Paul Aubin died in 1644. His son, Henri, became Lord of Ranton and, like most of his predecessors, he followed a career in the army. By 1650, he was a major of a Regiment of Dragoons. His wife was no doubt left to look after his daughter and the estates, while he took part in the campaigns against the Huguenots.

His Daughter, Marie Aubin, married Christofe Le Sesne de Menille, Lord of Menille and Veniers in 1665. Their eldest son, Louis-Charles, was born the following year. A daughter, Marie Scholastique, and a second son, Jean-Baptiste, were born soon afterwards. These were times of great misery in the area around Loudun. In 1675 to 1677, hail destroyed most of the harvest - both of grapes and wheat, the two staple crops of the area. The famine and poverty was so great that many died or left. Of the 3000 households in and around Loudun in 1670, only 1000 remained by 1677.

Louis-Charles Le Sesne, Lord of Bourdin in his own right, married Eustache-Henriette de Buade in 1685. She was probably the daughter of Louis de Buade de Frontenac, who was a Protestant courtier and Governor General of New France (in Canada) from 1672 to 1682 and from 1689 to his death in 1698, so was in France at the time of the wedding. A first son was born in March the following year. He was baptised Charles-Henri Le Sesne de Menille de Themars on 15 March in the church of St Pierre in Loudun. Within weeks, his grandfather died and Louis-Charles swore allegiance for Ranton on 27 May 1686. Befitting his status, he took the title of Baron of Ranton.

Charles-Henri had to wait 33 years until 1719 before he inherited the title, but he died four years later. He had no children, and the title passed to his younger brother, Jean Baptiste. Like many second sons at the time, the church offered the best chance of security, and Jean-Baptiste was already an established Janseniste priest. He combined this with his duties as Lord of Ranton, Pas de Jeu, Riveau, la Jaille and other estates until his death at Utrecht in 1775, but left no heir.

The Château de Ranton and the estates that went with it were sold on 26 August 1776 to the Marquis Michel-Ange de Castellane, Brigadier in the King's army and his Ambassador Extraordinary. He had also bought the Château de Villandry in 1754. In 1783 the estate passed to his son Esprit-François-Henri de Castellane, Marshall to the King's Camp and Chevalier d'Honneur to Sophie, Princess of France, the youngest daughter of Louis XVI of France and his Queen consort, Marie Antoinette.

== Ranton in the Revolution and 19th century ==
In the French Revolution, the Château de Ranton was abandoned only for a few years during the Terror and the estate passed to the Marshall's daughter on his death, in 1797. She died in 1824, and the Château de Ranton passed to her daughter, Madame d'Orme.

In 1844, Madame d'Orme sold the Château de Ranton to the priest of Ranton: Abbé Aubineau. He did much to preserve the Château and to rekindle interest in the shrine of "La bonne Dame de Ranton". This chapel, which dated from the 14th century, contained a small statue of the Virgin which had apparently been found by a woodcutter at this spot. The legend was that he took it home, but it returned to its original place, three times. In the revolution, the chapel was sold as public property. It was bought by a magistrate, M. Havard, who donated it to the Diocese. It was re-built as a larger church in 1871 through the efforts of the Reverend Pere Briant, an architect and organiser of one of the first pilgrimages to Lourdes. The larger church gave a new impetus to pilgrimages to Ranton, which had been a regular feature of life in the Middle Ages.

The chapel of the Château de Ranton, dedicated to St Leonard, was given to the village by Abbé Aubineau to serve as the Parish church in 1862. The deed of gift was written into the Commune records on 25 January.

In his will, he left the Château of Ranton to his great-nephews. They sold it at auction in December 1889. The only bidder was the schoolmaster of the neighbouring village of Curçay, Mr. Manson. By this time the Château was still habitable, but much of it was little more than a ruin. Like many similar properties throughout France, it fell to the local schoolmaster to preserve as well as he could the vestiges of the past. Mr. Manson is still remembered in the village as a severe and eccentric recluse. One of the main towers of the entrance collapsed in 1942 and on his death, in April that year, M. Manson left the estate to his housekeeper and his nephew.

== Restorations ==
The château was bought in 1964 by Mr and Mrs Piéchaud. He was a sculptor and undertook most of the substantial restoration and reconstruction of the walls and towers. He had great respect for the forms and styles of the various parts of the château, and the quality of the restoration work is remarkable. The Piechauds took on other restorations at the end of the 1960s and the Château de Ranton was sold in 1969 to Mr and Mrs Fonteneau, publishers in Poitiers.

In 1972, the Château de Ranton was sold to an American couple from Arizona, Mr and Mrs Baker. Little was changed in the château during the 1970s and 1980s and parts of the land around it were abandoned, although the main structure was well maintained. Mr Baker died in 1986 and his wife died in 1988.

The château and the surrounding land were acquired from the estate of the Baker family in October 1989 by the present owners, Peter and Paola Johnston, who have since renovated and restored it.

== See also ==
- List of castles in France
