= Ranton =

Ranton may refer to the following places:

- Ranton, Staffordshire, a village in England
- Ranton, Vienne, a village in France
