= Craon =

Craon may refer to:

- Craon, Mayenne, municipality in the Mayenne department, France
- Craon, former municipality, now part of Sionviller, Meurthe-et-Moselle department, France
- Craon, Vienne, municipality in the Vienne department, France
- Craon (river), tributary of the Airain flowing through the village of Jussy-Champagne, Cher department, France
