= Le Chêne Billault =

Coordinates: 46.9904°N 0.2915°E

Le Chêne Billault on a map of Centre region, France

Le Chêne Billault is a hamlet situated in the Indre-et-Loire (37) and Vienne (86) departments in central France. It lies 3.8 km south-west of Richelieu and is surrounded by agricultural land. The hamlet is situated on the border of three communes: Braye-sous-Faye, Nueil-sous-Faye, and Pouant.
