= Chalais =

Chalais may refer to:

- Chalais, Switzerland
- Chalais, Charente, a commune in France
- Chalais, Dordogne, formerly Chaleix, a commune in France
- Chalais, Indre, a commune in France
- Chalais, Vienne, a commune in France
- Monastère de Chalais, a convent in the Isère department of France
