= La Chaussée =

La Chausée may refer to:

== People ==
- Pierre-Claude Nivelle de La Chaussée, a French dramatist

== Places ==
- La Chaussée, Seine-Maritime, a commune of France in the Seine-Maritime department
- La Chaussée, Vienne, a commune of France in the Vienne department
- La Chaussée-d'Ivry, a commune of France in the Eure-et-Loir department
- La Chaussée-Saint-Victor, a commune of France in the Loir-et-Cher department
- La Chaussée-sur-Marne, a commune of France in the Marne department
- La Chaussée-Tirancourt, a commune of France in the Somme department
