= Nueil =

Nueil may refer to several communes in France:

- Nueil-les-Aubiers, Deux-Sèvres
- Nueil-sous-Faye, Vienne
- Nueil-sur-Layon, Maine-et-Loire
