= Maulay =

- Commune
- Location of Maulay
- Location within France Location within Nouvelle-Aquitaine
- Coordinates: 46°58′45″N 0°13′03″E
- Country: France
- Region: Nouvelle-Aquitaine
- Department: Vienne
- Arrondissement: Châtellerault
- Canton: Loudun
- Intercommunality: Pays Loudunais

Government
  - Mayor (2020–2026): Pierre Durand
- Area^{1}: 23.01 km^{2} (8.88 sq mi)
- Elevation: 72 m (236 ft)
- Highest elevation: 121 m (397 ft)
- Lowest elevation: 62 m (203 ft)
- Population (2023): 194
  - Density: 8.43/km^{2} (21.8/sq mi)
- Time zone: UTC+01:00 (CET)
  - Summer (DST): UTC+02:00 (CEST)
- INSEE/Postal code: 86151 /86200
- ^{1} French Land Register data, which excludes lakes, ponds, glaciers > 1 km^{2} (0.386 sq mi or 247 acres) and river estuaries.

Maulay (French pronunciation: [molɛ]) is a commune in the Vienne department in the Nouvelle-Aquitaine region in western France.

== Demographics ==
Historical population
| Year | Pop. | ±% p.a. |
|---|---|---|
| 1968 | 321 | — |
| 1975 | 238 | −4.18% |
| 1982 | 212 | −1.64% |
| 1990 | 212 | +0.00% |
| 1999 | 189 | −1.27% |
| 2007 | 192 | +0.20% |
| 2012 | 191 | −0.10% |
| 2017 | 182 | −0.96% |
| 2023 | 194 | +1.07% |
Source: INSEE

== See also ==
- Communes of the Vienne department
