= Coussay =

- Commune
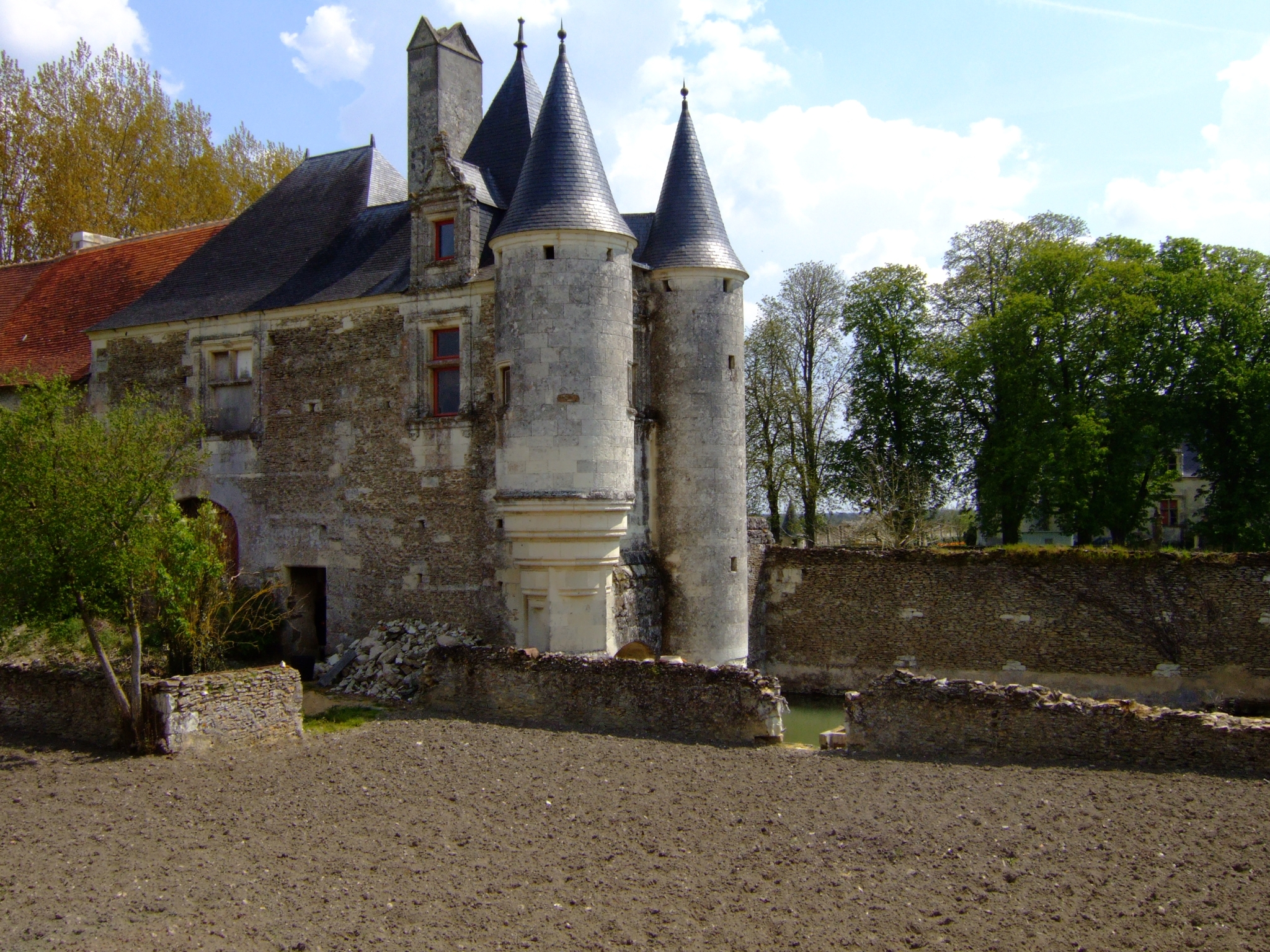
- The guardhouse at the entrance to the château, in Coussay
- Location of Coussay
- Location within France Location within Nouvelle-Aquitaine
- Coordinates: 46°50′18″N 0°12′14″E
- Country: France
- Region: Nouvelle-Aquitaine
- Department: Vienne
- Arrondissement: Châtellerault
- Canton: Loudun

Government
  - Mayor (2020–2026): Philippe Champier
- Area^{1}: 20.14 km^{2} (7.78 sq mi)
- Elevation: 240 m (790 ft)
- Highest elevation: 149 m (489 ft)
- Lowest elevation: 80 m (260 ft)
- Population (2023): 266
  - Density: 13.2/km^{2} (34.2/sq mi)
- Time zone: UTC+01:00 (CET)
  - Summer (DST): UTC+02:00 (CEST)
- INSEE/Postal code: 86085 /86110
- ^{1} French Land Register data, which excludes lakes, ponds, glaciers > 1 km^{2} (0.386 sq mi or 247 acres) and river estuaries.

Coussay (French pronunciation: [kusɛ]) is a commune in the Vienne department in the Nouvelle-Aquitaine region in western France.

== Demographics ==
Historical population
Year	Pop.	±% p.a.
1968	363	—
1975	302	−2.59%
1982	284	−0.87%
1990	264	−0.91%
1999	265	+0.04%
2007	265	+0.00%
2012	246	−1.48%
2017	251	+0.40%
2023	266	+0.97%
Source: INSEE

== See also ==
- Communes of the Vienne department
