= Raymond Vaillant =

French composer

- Born: 21 January 1935; Moncontour, Vienne, France
- Died: 18 February 2006 (aged 71)
- Occupations: Composer, librarian
- Years active: 1962–1995 (as librarian)
- Known for: Music palaeography and indexing at the Bibliothèque nationale de France and Opéra Garnier

Raymond Vaillant (21 January 1935 – 18 February 2006) was a French composer.

== Life ==
Born in Moncontour (Vienne), from 2 April 1962 until 1995, Vaillant held the position of librarian at the Bibliothèque nationale de France, and at the music department at the Opéra Garnier where he carried out an immense amount of work on palaeography, identifying and indexing the works preserved since the first French opera Pomone by Robert Cambert to the most recent works.

=== Music studies ===
- In Paris: harmony, counterpoint and fugue with Julien Falk.
- Analysis and composition with Claude Ballif.
- Henri Dutilleux the address to Max Deutsch with whom he studied the Second Viennese School and the great masterpieces of the past; he later became Max Deutsch's assistant in the composition class at the École Normale de Musique de Paris.

== Catalogue of works ==
- Trio Op. 1, 1968. [flute, cello & piano]. First performance Monday, February 17, 1969 at the Théâtre de la Musique-Gaîté Lyrique, by Anne-Marie de Lavilléon, piano, Jacques Castagner, flute and Michel Tournus, cello, as part of the Sorbonne's grand concerts.
- De-ci, de-là Op. 2, 1970. (13 min) Chamber concerto for 5 instruments [violin, viola, cello, flute and piano]. Premiere in 1971 à l'A.R.C. under the direction of Max Deutsch. Performed by the Trio de Paris on October 22, 1976. Recorded by the Trio de Paris (Radio-France, musical direction Daniel Chabrun) Published by Éditions musicales transatlantiques.
- Offrande lyrique Op. 3, 1970. (25 min) [choir of 16 mixed voices, 4 trombones, 4 cellos, 4 double basses and percussion]. The text is by the composer. First performance on March 12, 1987, in the grand auditorium of Radio-France. The Radio-France choirs, the instrumental ensemble of the new philharmonic orchestra were conducted by Michel Tranchant. Published by Éditions musicales transatlantiques.
- Filigrane Op. 4, 1973. [clarinet and piano]. Premiered Monday, May 21, 1973 at the Musée d'art moderne de la ville de Paris by the grand concerts of the Sorbonne; Tim Maloney, clarinet and Naohiko Kai, piano.
- Pour une ode à la neige Op. 6 No 1, 1974. (12 min) [clarinet, trumpet, vibraphone, piano, harp and string quartet]. Premiere Thursday, December 19, 1974 by the L'itinéraire ensemble placed under the direction of Boris de Vinogradov. Published by Éditions musicales transatlantiques.
- Au-delà de l'absence Op. 6 No 2, 1975. [Mezzo-soprano and 13 musicians]. This score was composed to texts by Roger Giroux. First performance on Saturday, December 11, 1976 in the main auditorium of the Maison de Radio-France by Anna Ringart, mezzo, the new philharmonic orchestra conducted by Juan Pablo Izquierdo as part of the Musique au présent concerts.
- Aurore opus 7, 1976. (9 min) [Flute, viola and harp] A piece commissioned by the Debussy Trio. First performance Tuesday, March 7, 1978 at the Musée d'art moderne de la ville de Paris by les grands concerts de la Sorbonne. Published by Éditions musicales transatlantiques.
- Lachrimae Mariae Op. 10, 1977. (20 min) [4 solo voices (or choir) and organ]. This work, first written for four soloists and organ, saw a second version for mixed choir for four voices, solos being requested from the first desks, and organ. First performance on Sunday, May 15, 1977 in the church of Hauvillers Abbey by the Alternance vocal ensemble on the occasion of the sixth centenary of the death of Guillaume de Machault. (On the program, there was also the Mass la sol fa ré mi by Josquin des Prés), Composition of the Alternance vocal ensemble: Ghislaine Victorius, soprano; Nicole Oxombre, contralto; Robert Dumé, tenor and Claude Méloni, bass. Françoise Rieunier played the organ, all were conducted by Boris de Vinogradov. Published by Éditions musicales transatlantiques.
- Splendore mane illuminas, mass Op. 12, 1980-1981. (1 h 10) [Soprano and baryton solo, 2 trumpets and trombone, mixed choir and organ]. Premiere 19 July 1981 at the festival d'Avignon, in the Notre-Dame des Doms church. With Claude Giroux soprano, Jacques Bona baritone; Henri Curity and Jacques Jamacon trumpets, Guy Bartalay trombone; the contemporary choir of the University of Aix-en-Provence (choir conductor: Roland Heyrabédian) under the baton of Boris de Vinogradov. Published by Éditions musicales transatlantiques.
