= Saint-Jean-de-Sauves =

- Commune
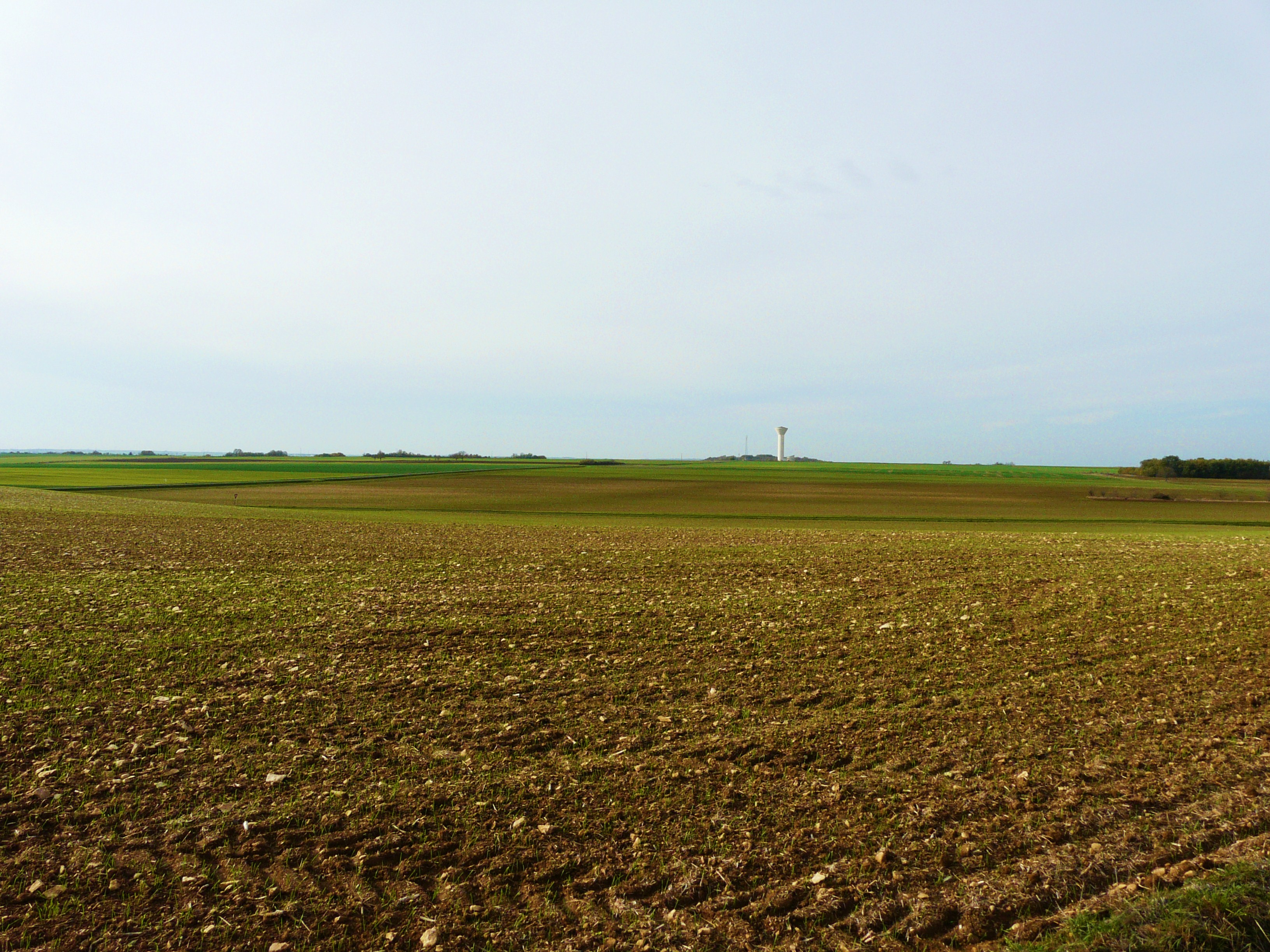
- The plain between Mazeuil and Saint-Jean-de-Sauves.
- Location of Saint-Jean-de-Sauves
- Location within France Location within Nouvelle-Aquitaine
- Coordinates: 46°50′28″N 0°05′38″E
- Country: France
- Region: Nouvelle-Aquitaine
- Department: Vienne
- Arrondissement: Châtellerault
- Canton: Loudun
- Intercommunality: Pays Loudunais

Government
  - Mayor (2020–2026): Christian Moreau
- Area^{1}: 56.58 km^{2} (21.85 sq mi)
- Elevation: 82 m (269 ft)
- Highest elevation: 130 m (430 ft)
- Lowest elevation: 60 m (200 ft)
- Population (2023): 1,281
  - Density: 22.64/km^{2} (58.64/sq mi)
- Time zone: UTC+01:00 (CET)
  - Summer (DST): UTC+02:00 (CEST)
- INSEE/Postal code: 86225 /86330
- ^{1} French Land Register data, which excludes lakes, ponds, glaciers > 1 km^{2} (0.386 sq mi or 247 acres) and river estuaries.

Saint-Jean-de-Sauves (French pronunciation: [sɛ̃ ʒɑ̃ də sov]) is a commune in the Vienne department in the Nouvelle-Aquitaine region in western France.

== Demographics ==
Historical population
Year	Pop.	±% p.a.
1968	1,557	—
1975	1,480	−0.72%
1982	1,486	+0.06%
1990	1,436	−0.43%
1999	1,294	−1.15%
2007	1,317	+0.22%
2012	1,352	+0.53%
2017	1,389	+0.54%
2023	1,281	−1.34%
Source: INSEE

== See also ==
- Communes of the Vienne department
