= Aulnay, Vienne =

Aulnay
- Commune
- Location of Aulnay
- Location within France Location within Nouvelle-Aquitaine
- Coordinates: 46°54′23″N 0°05′34″E
- Country: France
- Region: Nouvelle-Aquitaine
- Department: Vienne
- Arrondissement: Châtellerault
- Canton: Loudun
- Intercommunality: CC Pays Loudunais

Government
  - Mayor (2020–2026): Jacky Guignard
- Area^{1}: 8.01 km^{2} (3.09 sq mi)
- Elevation: 280 m (920 ft)
- Highest elevation: 87 m (285 ft)
- Lowest elevation: 66 m (217 ft)
- Population (2023): 107
  - Density: 13.4/km^{2} (34.6/sq mi)
- Time zone: UTC+01:00 (CET)
  - Summer (DST): UTC+02:00 (CEST)
- INSEE/Postal code: 86013 /86330
- ^{1} French Land Register data, which excludes lakes, ponds, glaciers > 1 km^{2} (0.386 sq mi or 247 acres) and river estuaries.

Aulnay (French pronunciation: [o(l)nɛ]) is a commune in the Vienne department in the Nouvelle-Aquitaine region in central-western France.

== See also ==
- Communes of the Vienne department
