= Morton, Vienne =

Morton
- Commune
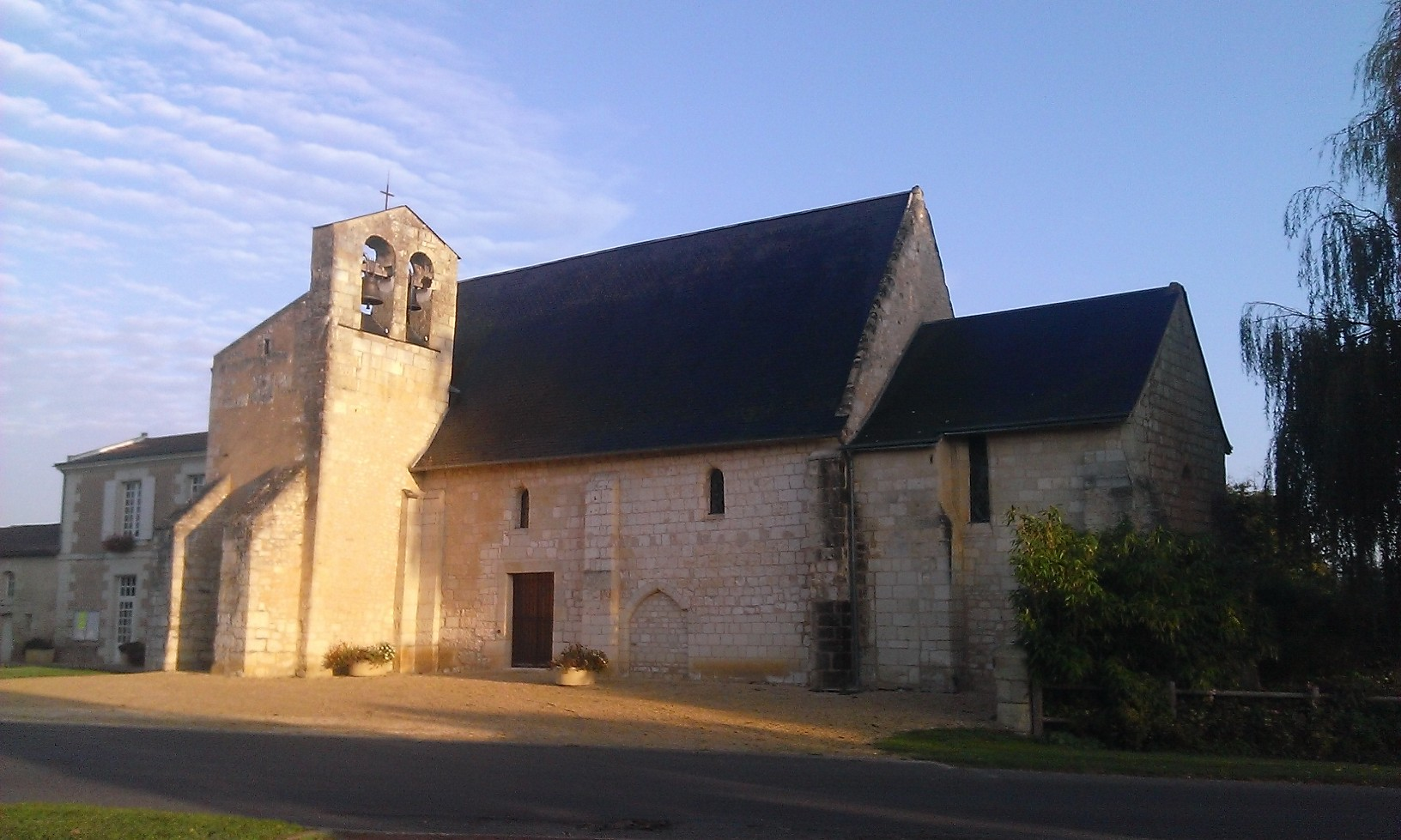
- The church in Morton
- Location of Morton
- Location within France Location within Nouvelle-Aquitaine
- Coordinates: 47°06′34″N 0°01′20″W
- Country: France
- Region: Nouvelle-Aquitaine
- Department: Vienne
- Arrondissement: Châtellerault
- Canton: Loudun
- Intercommunality: Pays Loudunais

Government
  - Mayor (2024–2026): Pascal Beausse
- Area^{1}: 7.99 km^{2} (3.08 sq mi)
- Elevation: 40 m (130 ft)
- Highest elevation: 49 m (161 ft)
- Lowest elevation: 31 m (102 ft)
- Population (2023): 370
  - Density: 46/km^{2} (120/sq mi)
- Time zone: UTC+01:00 (CET)
  - Summer (DST): UTC+02:00 (CEST)
- INSEE/Postal code: 86169 /86120
- ^{1} French Land Register data, which excludes lakes, ponds, glaciers > 1 km^{2} (0.386 sq mi or 247 acres) and river estuaries.

Morton (French pronunciation: [mɔʁtɔ̃]) is a commune in the Vienne department in the Nouvelle-Aquitaine region in western France.

== Demographics ==
Historical population
Year	Pop.	±% p.a.
1968	325	—
1975	313	−0.54%
1982	303	−0.46%
1990	315	+0.49%
1999	285	−1.11%
2007	335	+2.04%
2012	366	+1.79%
2017	346	−1.12%
2023	370	+1.12%
Source: INSEE

== See also ==
- Communes of the Vienne department
