= La Roche-Rigault =

- Commune
- Location of La Roche-Rigault
- Location within France Location within Nouvelle-Aquitaine
- Coordinates: 46°58′13″N 0°10′44″E
- Country: France
- Region: Nouvelle-Aquitaine
- Department: Vienne
- Arrondissement: Châtellerault
- Canton: Loudun
- Intercommunality: Pays Loudunais

Government
  - Mayor (2020–2026): James Garault
- Area^{1}: 25.64 km^{2} (9.90 sq mi)
- Elevation: 113 m (371 ft)
- Highest elevation: 121 m (397 ft)
- Lowest elevation: 59 m (194 ft)
- Population (2023): 565
  - Density: 22.0/km^{2} (57.1/sq mi)
- Time zone: UTC+01:00 (CET)
  - Summer (DST): UTC+02:00 (CEST)
- INSEE/Postal code: 86079 /86200
- ^{1} French Land Register data, which excludes lakes, ponds, glaciers > 1 km^{2} (0.386 sq mi or 247 acres) and river estuaries.

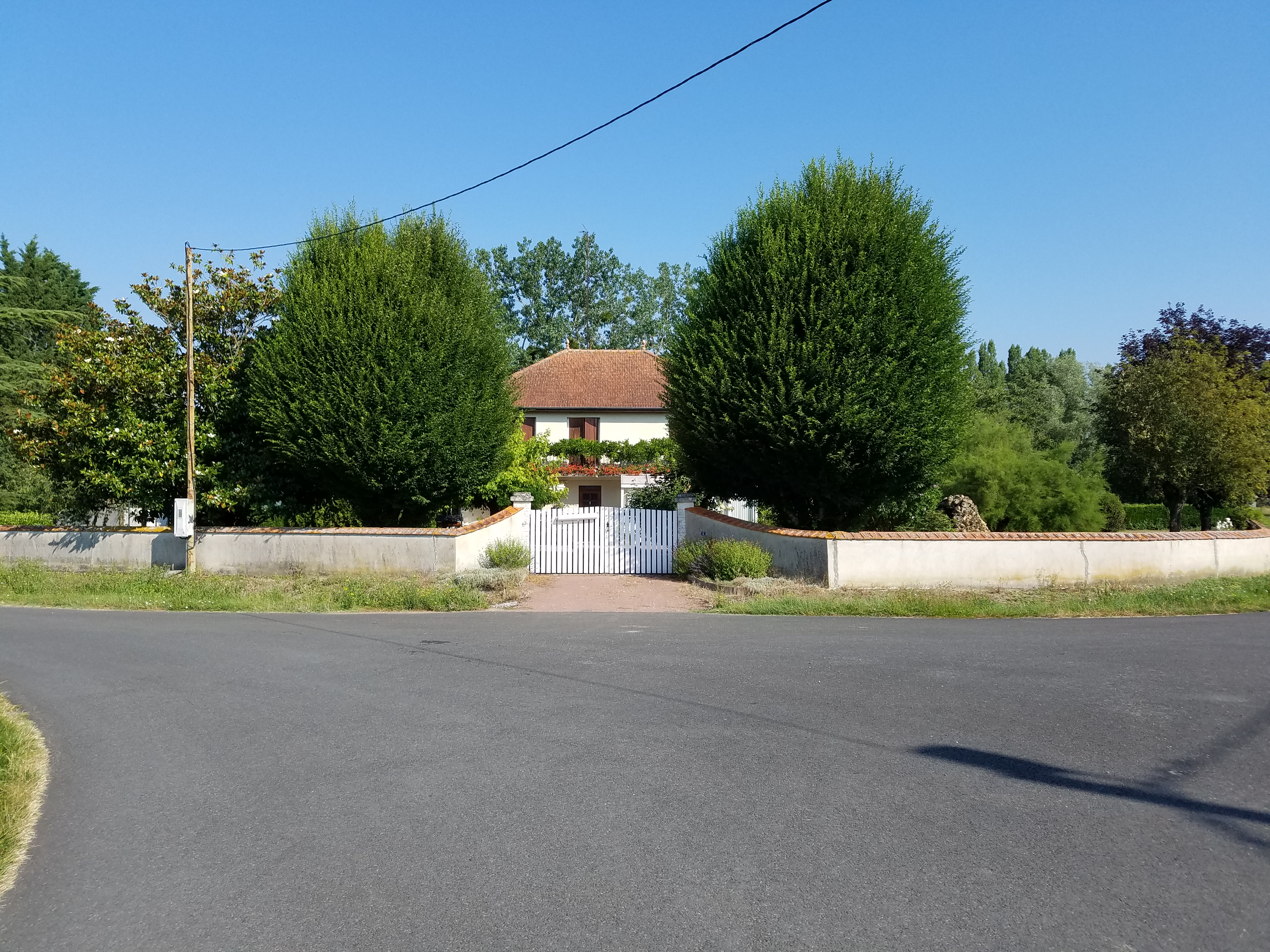
House at a place called le Bouchet in La Roche-Rigault in 2018.

La Roche-Rigault (French pronunciation: [la ʁɔʃ ʁiɡo]) is a commune in the Vienne department in the Nouvelle-Aquitaine region in western France.

== Demographics ==
Historical population
Year	Pop.	±% p.a.
1968	676	—
1975	581	−2.14%
1982	578	−0.07%
1990	557	−0.46%
1999	506	−1.06%
2007	536	+0.72%
2012	538	+0.07%
2017	556	+0.66%
2023	565	+0.27%
Source: INSEE

== See also ==
- Communes of the Vienne department
