= Mouterre-Silly =

- Commune
- Location of Mouterre-Silly
- Location within France Location within Nouvelle-Aquitaine
- Coordinates: 46°58′34″N 0°02′44″E
- Country: France
- Region: Nouvelle-Aquitaine
- Department: Vienne
- Arrondissement: Châtellerault
- Canton: Loudun
- Intercommunality: Pays Loudunais

Government
  - Mayor (2020–2026): Alain Adhumeau
- Area^{1}: 30.89 km^{2} (11.93 sq mi)
- Elevation: 90 m (300 ft)
- Highest elevation: 122 m (400 ft)
- Lowest elevation: 53 m (174 ft)
- Population (2023): 602
  - Density: 19.5/km^{2} (50.5/sq mi)
- Time zone: UTC+01:00 (CET)
  - Summer (DST): UTC+02:00 (CEST)
- INSEE/Postal code: 86173 /86200
- ^{1} French Land Register data, which excludes lakes, ponds, glaciers > 1 km^{2} (0.386 sq mi or 247 acres) and river estuaries.

Mouterre-Silly is a commune in the Vienne department in the Nouvelle-Aquitaine region in western France.

== Demographics ==
Historical population
Year	Pop.	±% p.a.
1968	766	—
1975	749	−0.32%
1982	675	−1.48%
1990	710	+0.63%
1999	678	−0.51%
2007	712	+0.61%
2012	690	−0.63%
2017	663	−0.80%
2023	602	−1.60%
Source: INSEE

== See also ==
- Communes of the Vienne department
