= Canton of Loudun =

Coordinates: 47.01°N 0.08°E

The canton of Loudun is an administrative division of the Vienne department, western France. Its borders were modified at the French canton reorganisation which came into effect in March 2015. Its seat is in Loudun.

It consists of the following communes:

1. Angliers
2. Arçay
3. Aulnay
4. Basses
5. Berrie
6. Berthegon
7. Beuxes
8. Bournand
9. Ceaux-en-Loudun
10. Cernay
11. Chalais
12. La Chaussée
13. Chouppes
14. Coussay
15. Craon
16. Curçay-sur-Dive
17. Dercé
18. Doussay
19. Glénouze
20. La Grimaudière
21. Guesnes
22. Loudun
23. Martaizé
24. Maulay
25. Mazeuil
26. Messemé
27. Moncontour
28. Monts-sur-Guesnes
29. Morton
30. Mouterre-Silly
31. Nueil-sous-Faye
32. Pouançay
33. Pouant
34. Prinçay
35. Ranton
36. Raslay
37. La Roche-Rigault
38. Roiffé
39. Saint-Clair
40. Saint-Jean-de-Sauves
41. Saint-Laon
42. Saint-Léger-de-Montbrillais
43. Saires
44. Saix
45. Sammarçolles
46. Ternay
47. Les Trois-Moutiers
48. Verrue
49. Vézières
