= Ternay, Vienne =

Ternay
- Commune
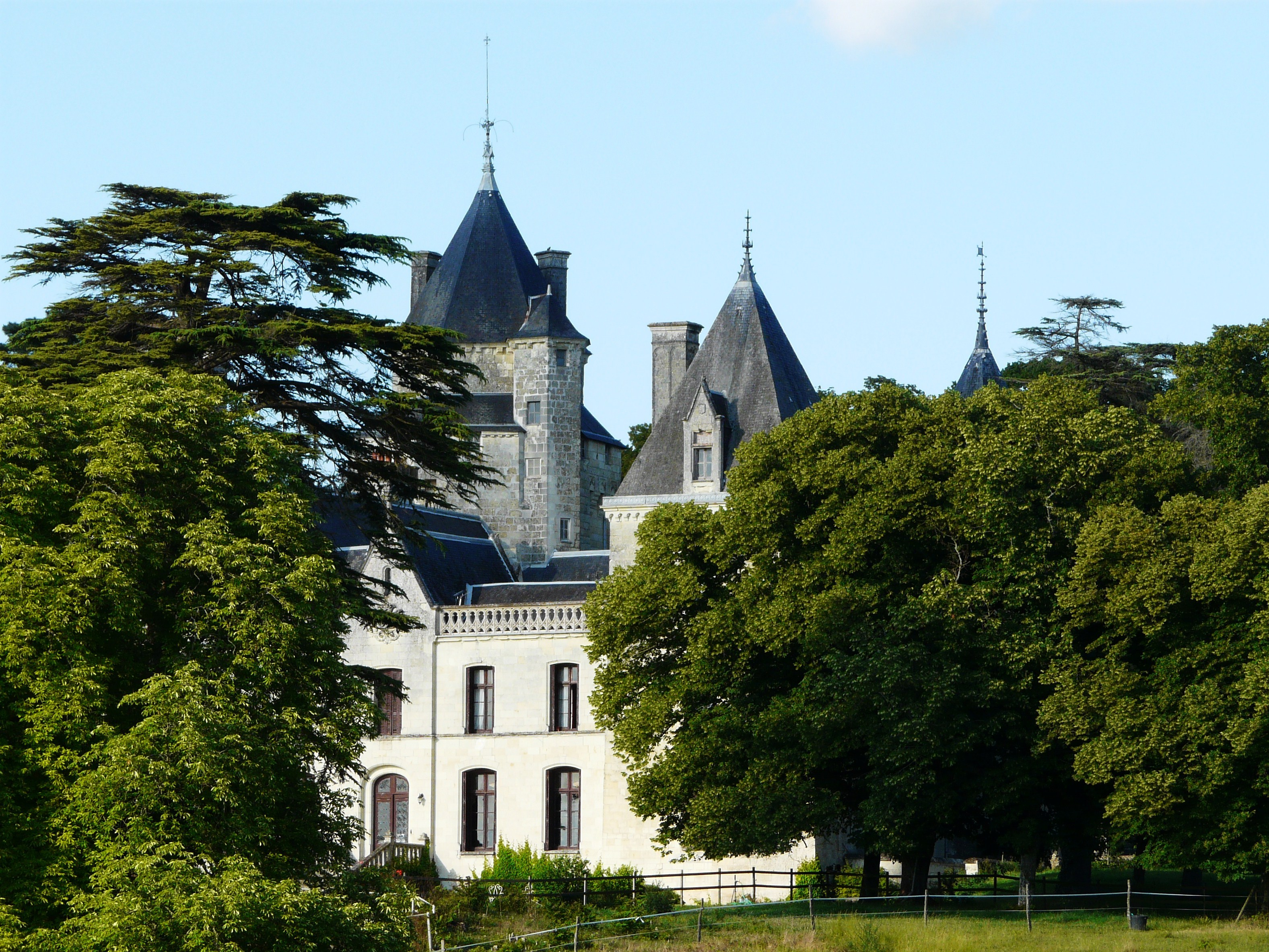
- The Château of Ternay
- Location of Ternay
- Location within France Location within Nouvelle-Aquitaine
- Coordinates: 47°02′10″N 0°03′03″W
- Country: France
- Region: Nouvelle-Aquitaine
- Department: Vienne
- Arrondissement: Châtellerault
- Canton: Loudun
- Intercommunality: Pays Loudunais

Government
  - Mayor (2025–2026): Yannick Pierre
- Area^{1}: 10.05 km^{2} (3.88 sq mi)
- Elevation: 113 m (371 ft)
- Highest elevation: 124 m (407 ft)
- Lowest elevation: 38 m (125 ft)
- Population (2023): 189
  - Density: 18.8/km^{2} (48.7/sq mi)
- Time zone: UTC+01:00 (CET)
  - Summer (DST): UTC+02:00 (CEST)
- INSEE/Postal code: 86269 /86120
- ^{1} French Land Register data, which excludes lakes, ponds, glaciers > 1 km^{2} (0.386 sq mi or 247 acres) and river estuaries.

Ternay (French pronunciation: [tɛʁnɛ]) is a commune in the Vienne department in the Nouvelle-Aquitaine region in western France. It is mentioned by Gregory of Tours in his Miracles of Martin as "village de Ternay, situé dans le Maine" the site of a miracle where a blind woman regained her sight after fervently invoking St. Martin of Tours.

== Demographics ==
Historical population
Year	Pop.	±% p.a.
1968	259	—
1975	213	−2.75%
1982	215	+0.13%
1990	183	−1.99%
1999	168	−0.95%
2007	208	+2.71%
2012	180	−2.85%
2017	184	+0.44%
2023	189	+0.45%
Source: INSEE

== See also ==
- Communes of the Vienne department
