= Saint-Laon =

- Commune
- Location of Saint-Laon
- Location within France Location within Nouvelle-Aquitaine
- Coordinates: 46°58′46″N 0°00′55″W
- Country: France
- Region: Nouvelle-Aquitaine
- Department: Vienne
- Arrondissement: Châtellerault
- Canton: Loudun
- Intercommunality: Pays Loudunais

Government
  - Mayor (2020–2026): Jean-François Martin
- Area^{1}: 11.93 km^{2} (4.61 sq mi)
- Elevation: 60 m (200 ft)
- Highest elevation: 117 m (384 ft)
- Lowest elevation: 45 m (148 ft)
- Population (2023): 136
  - Density: 11.4/km^{2} (29.5/sq mi)
- Time zone: UTC+01:00 (CET)
  - Summer (DST): UTC+02:00 (CEST)
- INSEE/Postal code: 86227 /86200
- ^{1} French Land Register data, which excludes lakes, ponds, glaciers > 1 km^{2} (0.386 sq mi or 247 acres) and river estuaries.

Saint-Laon is a commune in the Vienne department in the Nouvelle-Aquitaine region in western France.

== Demographics ==
Historical population
Year	Pop.	±% p.a.
1968	193	—
1975	155	−3.08%
1982	163	+0.72%
1990	148	−1.20%
1999	141	−0.54%
2007	126	−1.40%
2012	128	+0.32%
2017	126	−0.31%
2023	136	+1.28%
Source: INSEE

== See also ==
- Communes of the Vienne department
