= Saix, Vienne =

Saix
- Commune
- Location of Saix
- Location within France Location within Nouvelle-Aquitaine
- Coordinates: 47°08′17″N 0°00′04″E
- Country: France
- Region: Nouvelle-Aquitaine
- Department: Vienne
- Arrondissement: Châtellerault
- Canton: Loudun
- Intercommunality: Pays Loudunais

Government
  - Mayor (2020–2026): Sylvie Barillot
- Area^{1}: 22.55 km^{2} (8.71 sq mi)
- Elevation: 115 m (377 ft)
- Highest elevation: 117 m (384 ft)
- Lowest elevation: 34 m (112 ft)
- Population (2023): 250
  - Density: 11/km^{2} (29/sq mi)
- Time zone: UTC+01:00 (CET)
  - Summer (DST): UTC+02:00 (CEST)
- INSEE/Postal code: 86250 /86120
- ^{1} French Land Register data, which excludes lakes, ponds, glaciers > 1 km^{2} (0.386 sq mi or 247 acres) and river estuaries.

Saix is a commune in the Vienne department in the Nouvelle-Aquitaine region in western France.

== Demographics ==
Historical population
Year	Pop.	±% p.a.
1968	290	—
1975	235	−2.96%
1982	189	−3.06%
1990	171	−1.24%
1999	185	+0.88%
2007	211	+1.66%
2012	278	+5.67%
2017	290	+0.85%
2023	250	−2.44%
Source: INSEE

== See also ==
- Communes of the Vienne department
