= Prinçay =

- Commune
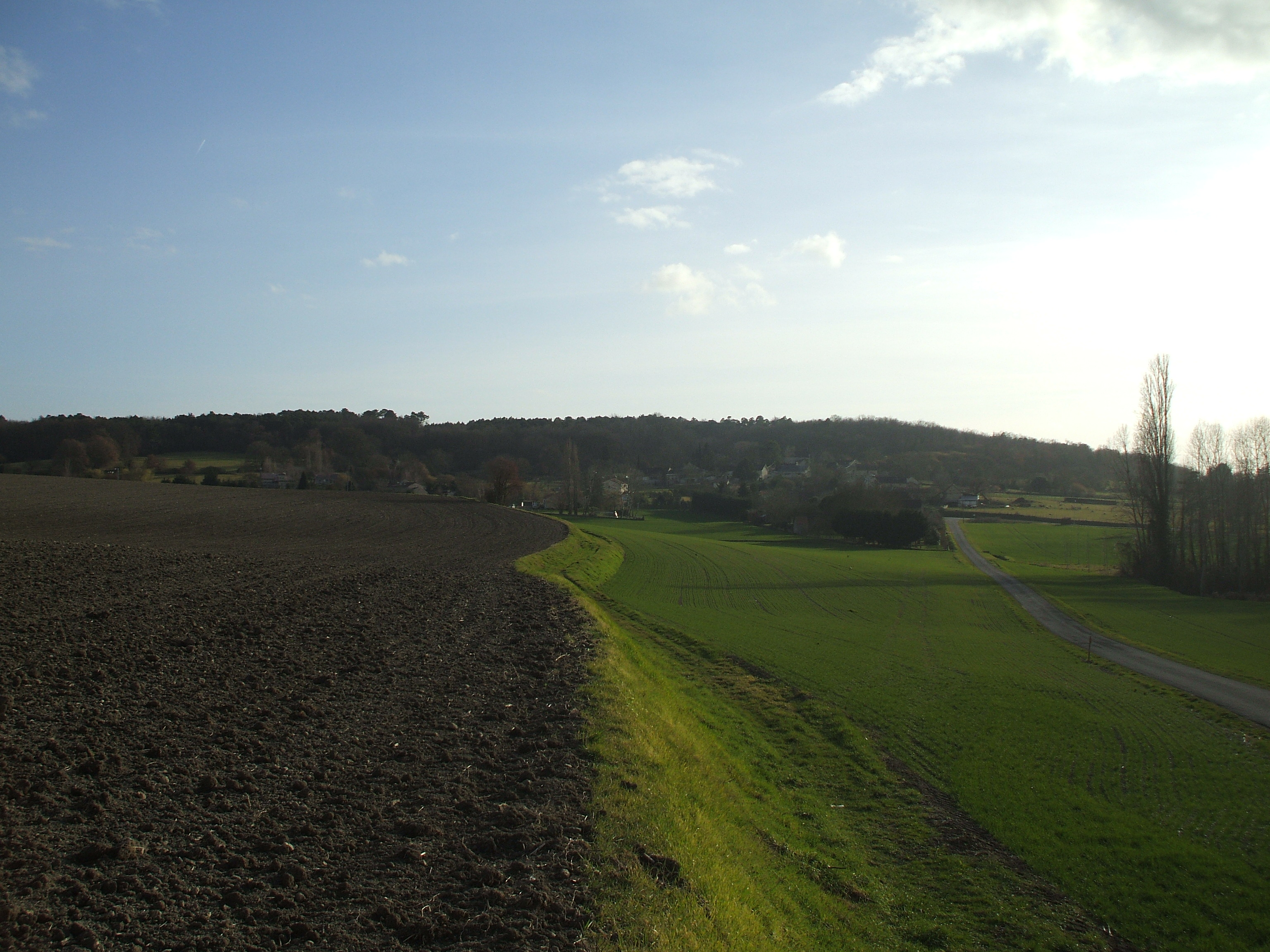
- The village and the surrounding countryside in Prinçay
- Location of Prinçay
- Location within France Location within Nouvelle-Aquitaine
- Coordinates: 46°56′03″N 0°14′43″E
- Country: France
- Region: Nouvelle-Aquitaine
- Department: Vienne
- Arrondissement: Châtellerault
- Canton: Loudun
- Intercommunality: Pays Loudunais

Government
  - Mayor (2020–2026): Frédéric Mignon
- Area^{1}: 16.59 km^{2} (6.41 sq mi)
- Elevation: 126 m (413 ft)
- Highest elevation: 146 m (479 ft)
- Lowest elevation: 62 m (203 ft)
- Population (2023): 201
  - Density: 12.1/km^{2} (31.4/sq mi)
- Time zone: UTC+01:00 (CET)
  - Summer (DST): UTC+02:00 (CEST)
- INSEE/Postal code: 86201 /86420
- ^{1} French Land Register data, which excludes lakes, ponds, glaciers > 1 km^{2} (0.386 sq mi or 247 acres) and river estuaries.

Prinçay (French pronunciation: [pʁɛ̃sɛ]) is a commune in the Vienne department in the Nouvelle-Aquitaine region in western France.

== Demographics ==
Historical population
Year	Pop.	±% p.a.
1968	353	—
1975	301	−2.25%
1982	254	−2.40%
1990	218	−1.89%
1999	195	−1.23%
2007	237	+2.47%
2012	228	−0.77%
2017	217	−0.98%
2023	201	−1.27%
Source: INSEE

== See also ==
- Communes of the Vienne department
