= Berrie, Vienne =

Berrie
- Commune
- Location of Berrie
- Location within France Location within Nouvelle-Aquitaine
- Coordinates: 47°04′05″N 0°04′03″W
- Country: France
- Region: Nouvelle-Aquitaine
- Department: Vienne
- Arrondissement: Châtellerault
- Canton: Loudun
- Intercommunality: Pays Loudunais

Government
  - Mayor (2020–2026): Jean-Paul Fulneau
- Area^{1}: 16.64 km^{2} (6.42 sq mi)
- Elevation: 92 m (302 ft)
- Highest elevation: 124 m (407 ft)
- Lowest elevation: 36 m (118 ft)
- Population (2023): 251
  - Density: 15.1/km^{2} (39.1/sq mi)
- Time zone: UTC+01:00 (CET)
  - Summer (DST): UTC+02:00 (CEST)
- INSEE/Postal code: 86022 /86120
- ^{1} French Land Register data, which excludes lakes, ponds, glaciers > 1 km^{2} (0.386 sq mi or 247 acres) and river estuaries.

Berrie (French pronunciation: [beʁi]) is a commune in the Vienne department in the Nouvelle-Aquitaine region in western France.

== See also ==
- Communes of the Vienne department
