= Bernadette Cattanéo =

French trade unionist and communist activist (1899–1963)

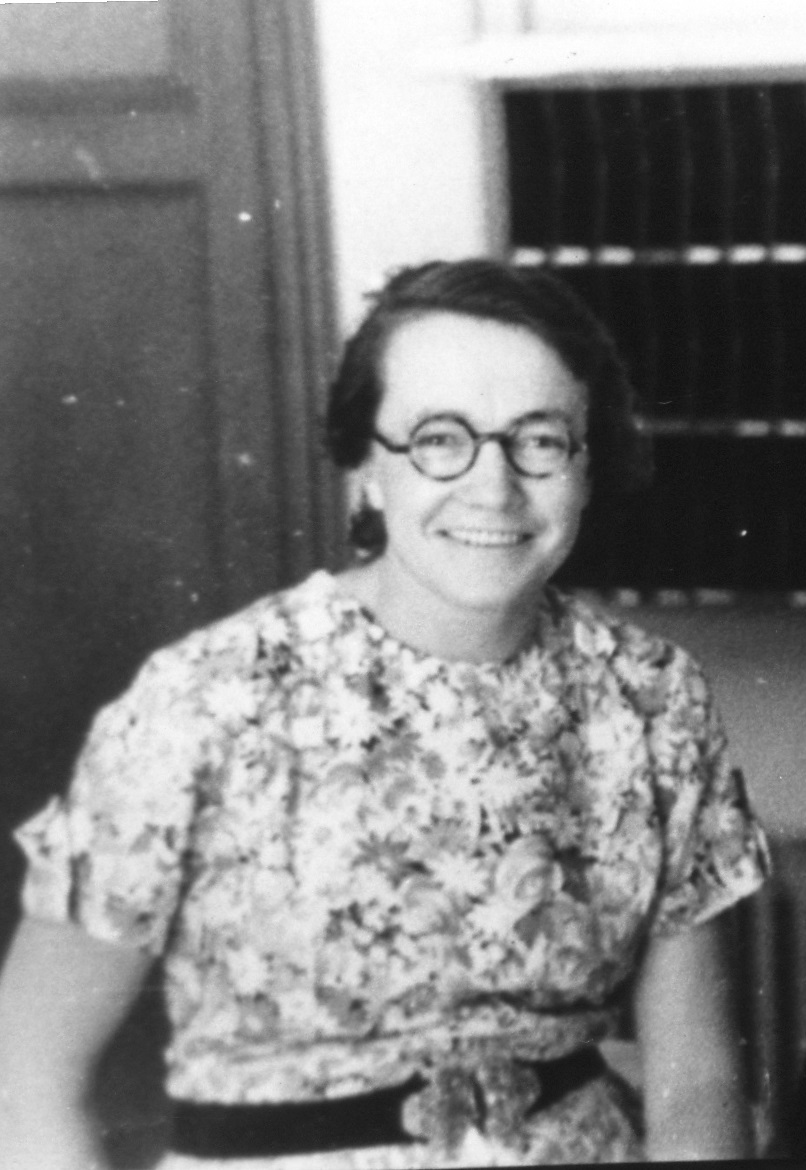
- Cattanéo in 1936
- Born: Bernadette Le Loarer; 25 February 1899; Brélévenez, Côtes-d'Armor, France
- Died: 22 September 1963 (aged 64); La Penne-sur-Huveaune, Bouches-du-Rhône, France
- Occupations: Trade unionist; communist activist; newspaper editor; magazine co-founder
- Spouse: Jean-Baptiste Cattanéo (m. 1922)
- Children: 2

Bernadette Cattanéo (née Le Loarer; 25 February 1899 – 22 September 1963) was a French trade unionist and communist activist, as well as a newspaper editor and magazine co-founder. She is remembered as the secretary general of the World Committee Against War and Fascism. Cattanéo also held various roles of importance within the Confédération générale du travail unitaire (CGTU) and the French Communist Party (PCF).

== Early life ==
Bernadette Le Loarer was born in Brélévenez, Côtes-d'Armor, 25 February 1899. Her parents were Jean Marie Le Loarer, a railwayman, and Marie Ollivier, an illiterate peasant. Her family was Breton-speaking and Catholic, but it was a teacher who awakened Cattaneo to socialist ideas. She trained as a seamstress before going to Paris in 1919 to do several odd jobs. There, she met Jean-Baptiste Cattanéo, who, like her, was a pharmacy employee. They married on 10 October 1922 and had two children.

== Career ==
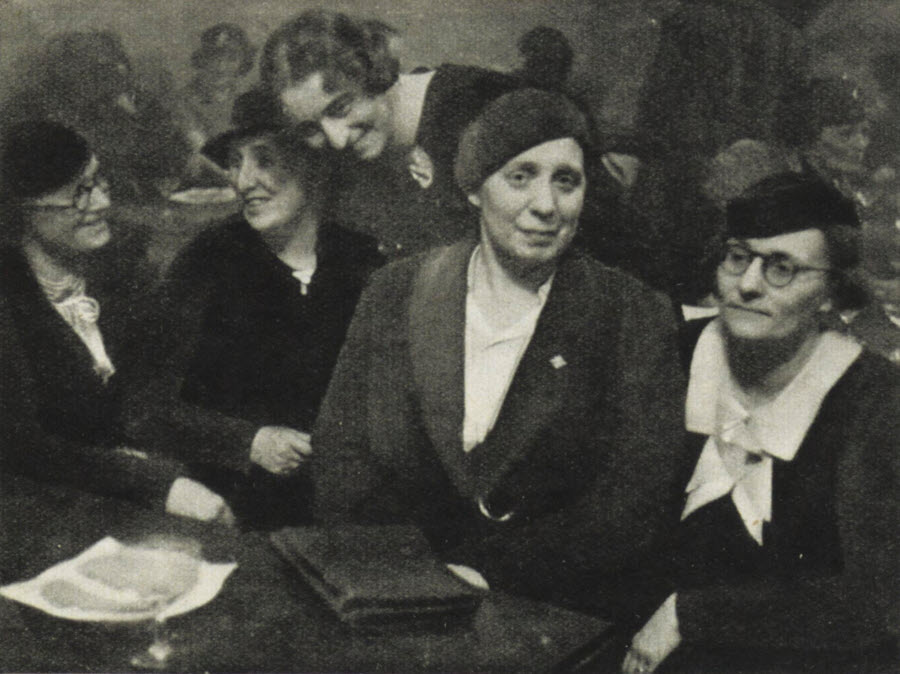
Bernadette Cattanéo, Luce Langevin, Wanda Landy, Margarita Nelken, and Maria Rabaté (l-r) celebrating the victory of the Popular Front in Spain in 1936, under the auspices of the Women's Committee.

At the end of 1923, Cattanéo joined the French Communist Party, with an interest in issues affecting women. She was fired from her job in a pharmacy for having organized a strike with her husband and found employment as editor of the newspaper La Nouvelle Vie Ouvrière in April 1925.

After a reorganisation of the PCF, she directed its 35th department and was a member of the party's women's commission. At the same time, she joined the women's commission of the CGTU, of which she was appointed secretary in 1929, and joined the confederal office in November 1931. During this time, she was on the editorial board of L'Ouvrière. She traveled in France and Europe between 1925 and 1936 to follow the strikes organized by the CGTU.

Cattanéo was also active internationally since she took part in the fourth congress of Profintern on 5 April 1928 in the USSR, where she met Joseph Stalin. She travelled there eleven times. Georgi Dimitrov made her responsible for setting up the World Committee of Women Against War and Fascism in 1934. In this coordinated development, she was secretary of the International Women's Organisations' Joint Coordination Committee, where she represented the PCF and the CGTU and associated with Gabrielle Duchêne and Maria Rabaté, herself a communist leader. The magazine Femmes dans l'action mondiale (Women in Global Action) was created in this connection and was managed by these three women.

When World War II broke out, she opposed the Molotov–Ribbentrop Pact, left the PCF and in late 1941 moved to Moissac in France's Zone libre, where she coordinated a number of resistance initiatives. She returned to Paris in June 1944 and discontinued all her political activities. She nevertheless maintained contact with former communist figures such as Albert Vassart and Angelo Tasca.

== Death and legacy ==
Bernadette Cattanéo died in La Penne-sur-Huveaune, Bouches-du-Rhône, 22 September 1963.

Her papers are held by the Humathèque, on the Condorcet Campus.
