= Chouppes =

- Commune
- Coat of arms
- Location of Chouppes
- Location within France Location within Nouvelle-Aquitaine
- Coordinates: 46°48′44″N 0°09′54″E
- Country: France
- Region: Nouvelle-Aquitaine
- Department: Vienne
- Arrondissement: Châtellerault
- Canton: Loudun

Government
  - Mayor (2020–2026): Benoît Prinçay
- Area^{1}: 31.72 km^{2} (12.25 sq mi)
- Elevation: 85 m (279 ft)
- Highest elevation: 157 m (515 ft)
- Lowest elevation: 79 m (259 ft)
- Population (2023): 802
  - Density: 25.3/km^{2} (65.5/sq mi)
- Time zone: UTC+01:00 (CET)
  - Summer (DST): UTC+02:00 (CEST)
- INSEE/Postal code: 86075 /86110
- ^{1} French Land Register data, which excludes lakes, ponds, glaciers > 1 km^{2} (0.386 sq mi or 247 acres) and river estuaries.

Chouppes (French pronunciation: [ʃup]) is a commune in the Vienne department in the Nouvelle-Aquitaine region in western France.

== History ==
Like the rest of France, Chouppes and Poligny welcome the advances of the French Revolution. Thus they plant their tree of freedom, as common symbol of the Revolution. It becomes the rallying point of all the festivals and major revolutionary events, such as the burning of securities feudal Poligny November 17, 1793 or the celebration of the recapture of Toulon to the English 19 January 1794. The neighboring town of Poligny is attached to Chouppes in 1848. Another tree of liberty planted in 1948 to celebrate the centenary of the French Revolution of 1848.

== Toponymy ==
The name of the village comes from the name of the lord of the place: Petrus de Chaoppa. The origin would be Catuoppus, Gaulish word meaning the eye of the fight.

== Demographics ==
Historical population
Year	Pop.	±% p.a.
1968	634	—
1975	574	−1.41%
1982	674	+2.32%
1990	740	+1.17%
1999	693	−0.73%
2007	736	+0.76%
2012	762	+0.70%
2017	750	−0.32%
2023	802	+1.12%
Source: INSEE

== Economy ==
According to the Regional Directorate for Food, Agriculture and Forestry of Poitou-Charentes, there are only 44 farms in 2010 against 69 in 2000. Agricultural land used increased by 10% from 2,726 hectares in 2000 to 2,999 hectares in 2010. These figures indicate a concentration of land on a smaller number of farms. This trend is in line with developments in the entire Vienne département since from 2000 to 2007, each farm gained an average of 20 hectares. 57% of agricultural land is intended for cereals (mainly soft wheat but also barley and maize), 26% for oilseeds (rapeseed and sunflower), 6% for fodder and 2% for herbs. In 2010, 23 hectares (22 in 2000) are devoted to the vine for the production of Haut-Poitou AOC. The vineyard is managed by nine farms in 2010 against 23 in 2000. Four farms in 2010 (against ten in 2000) are home to a cattle farm (195 in 2010 against 575 in 2000). Five farms in 2010 (compared to eight in 2000) are home to a sheep farm (242 head in 2010 against 199 head in 2000). Poultry farming disappeared in 2010 (4,873 head of 35 farms in 2000).

== See also ==
- Communes of the Vienne department
