= Maria Rabaté =

French legislator and politician (1900-1985)

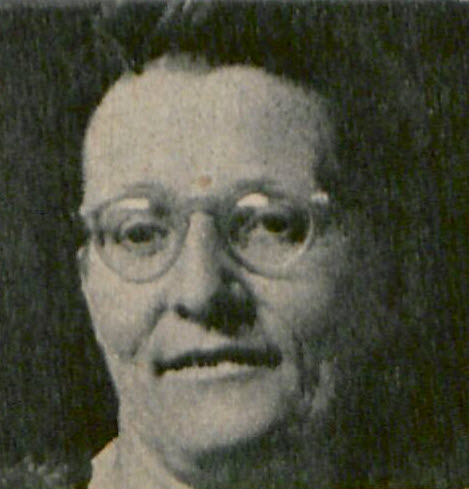

Member of the National Assembly (France) for Seine (department)'s 1st constituency
- In office 10 November 1946 – 4 July 1951
- In office 17 June 1951 – 1 December 1955
- In office 2 January 1956 – 8 December 1958

Personal details
- Born: Maria Bernuchon; 3 July 1900 Moncontour, Vienne
- Died: 8 February 1985 (aged 84)
- Party: French Communist Party
- Spouse: Octave Rabaté

Maria Rabaté (3 July 1900 - 8 February 1985) was a French politician, writer, and school teacher. She was a member of the French Communist Party, trade unionist, and elected representative of the 1st district of Seine in the French Parliament, from 1946 to 1960. She was also appointed a knight of the Legion of Honor for the Resistance.

== Life ==
She was born as Maria Bernuchon on July 3, 1900 in Moncontour, Vienne, and her father was a school teacher and a pacifist. From 1916 to 1919, she studied at the École Normale in Châteauroux, where she credits her teachers with influencing her political views. She was trained as a teacher and appointed to teach in 1922. She met her husband, Octave Rabaté, and had two children with him, Claude Marie (born in 1928), and Jean (born in 1931), eventually marrying Rabaté in 1953, in Paris.

== Career ==
Rabaté was active in politics throughout her career, joining a union after she completed her education, and joining the French Communist Party in 1921. Rabaté was a member of the Indre Education Union, sat on their council from 1924 to 1925, and attended federal trade union conventions as their representative, from 1921 to 1927. She also campaigned for the Communist Party among the women of Indre. In 1927, she was a delegate at the National Women's Conference in Bordeaux, where she met her husband, fellow politician and activist, Octave Rabaté. She later moved to Bordeaux, where she was the chief organizer of the Women's Committee against War and Fascism, and recruited for the Communist Party, while her husband headed a trade union. Rabaté wrote for L'Ouvrière, a newspaper published by the French Communist Party, from 1925 to 1928.

In 1930 and 1931, the Rabatés moved to Moscow, as Octave faced investigations by the French police for his involvement in agitations, and they later moved to Barcelona in 1932. During this time, Maria worked as a stenographer and typist at the newspaper, L'Humanité, working from the USSR Embassy, and as a proofreader for the Comintern. The Rabatés eventually returned to France, living in Bordeaux, where Octave led a trade union and Maria worked as an organizer and recruiter amongst local women for the Communist Party, leading agitations for better working conditions for factory workers.

In 1935, she moved with her family to Paris, where she shifted focus from labor and trade union issues to anti-fascist activism. In 1937, Rabaté actively supported the efforts of the Second Spanish Republic, travelling there to attend the Second Congress of Catalan and Spanish Women. Along with Bernadette Cattanéo, she was a representative at meetings of the Executive Committee of the Communist International in Moscow as well. She continued participation in Communist efforts through the 1930s, eventually travelling to live with her mother and children in Poitiers while her husband faced legal action. She headed the Femmes Patriotes de Normandie, an organisation associated with the French Popular Front, and directed local women's committees, eventually becoming a founding member and leader of the Union of French Women. She also served as a deputy for the Communist Party from 1946 to 1958.

Rabaté initially served in municipal bodies, being elected the secretary of the provisional city council of Paris in 1945, and sitting on the city council from 1950 onwards. In October 1945, she also ran unsuccessfully for legislative elections, from the 1st constituency of Seine. Rabaté was elected to the National Assembly of the French Parliament in November 1946, representing the 1st constituency of Seine, and did not re-contest municipal elections thereafter, choosing to focus on her legislative work. She was re-elected again from 1951 to 1956, and for a third time, serving until 1958 for a total of three terms. During her term as an elected representative, she served on committees dedicated to family, population, public health (as vice-president) as well as Reconstruction and War Damage, and Justice and Legislation.
