= Cernay, Vienne =

Cernay
- Commune
- Location of Cernay
- Location within France Location within Nouvelle-Aquitaine
- Coordinates: 46°50′04″N 0°18′17″E
- Country: France
- Region: Nouvelle-Aquitaine
- Department: Vienne
- Arrondissement: Châtellerault
- Canton: Loudun
- Intercommunality: CA Grand Châtellerault

Government
  - Mayor (2020–2026): Laurent Roy
- Area^{1}: 3.29 km^{2} (1.27 sq mi)
- Elevation: 86 m (282 ft)
- Highest elevation: 110 m (360 ft)
- Lowest elevation: 74 m (243 ft)
- Population (2023): 466
  - Density: 142/km^{2} (367/sq mi)
- Time zone: UTC+01:00 (CET)
  - Summer (DST): UTC+02:00 (CEST)
- INSEE/Postal code: 86047 /86140
- ^{1} French Land Register data, which excludes lakes, ponds, glaciers > 1 km^{2} (0.386 sq mi or 247 acres) and river estuaries.

Cernay (French pronunciation: [sɛʁnɛ]) is a commune in the Vienne department in the Nouvelle-Aquitaine region in western France.

== Demographics ==
Historical population
Year	Pop.	±% p.a.
1968	313	—
1975	301	−0.56%
1982	302	+0.05%
1990	347	+1.75%
1999	384	+1.13%
2007	425	+1.28%
2012	452	+1.24%
2017	477	+1.08%
2023	466	−0.39%
Source: INSEE

== See also ==
- Communes of the Vienne department
