= Pouant =

- Commune
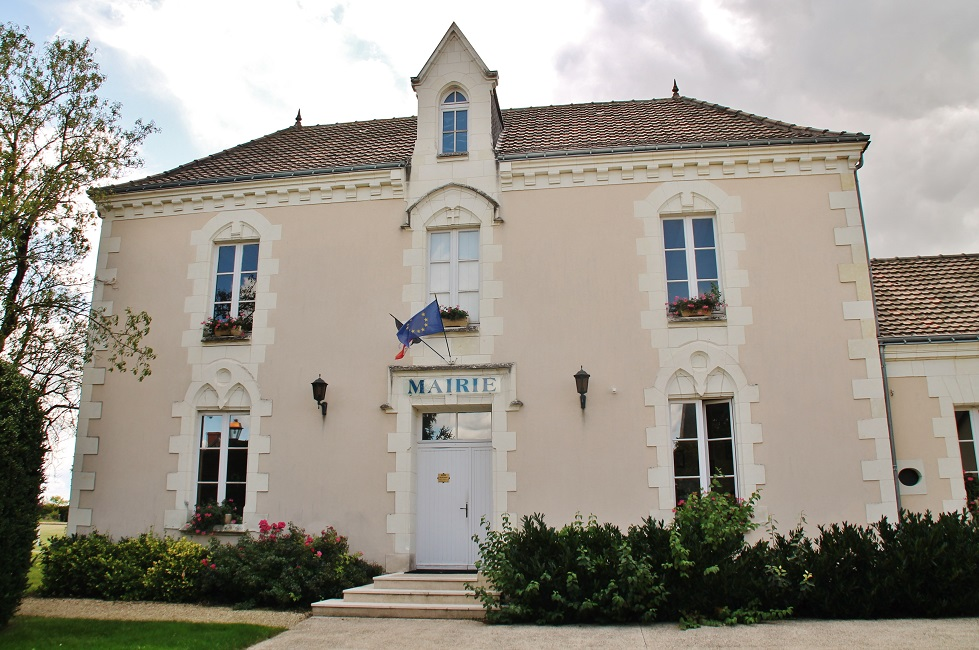
- Town hall
- Location of Pouant
- Location within France Location within Nouvelle-Aquitaine
- Coordinates: 47°00′24″N 0°16′18″E
- Country: France
- Region: Nouvelle-Aquitaine
- Department: Vienne
- Arrondissement: Châtellerault
- Canton: Loudun
- Intercommunality: Pays Loudunais

Government
  - Mayor (2020–2026): Jacques Proust
- Area^{1}: 26.57 km^{2} (10.26 sq mi)
- Elevation: 2,002 m (6,568 ft)
- Highest elevation: 112 m (367 ft)
- Lowest elevation: 47 m (154 ft)
- Population (2023): 407
  - Density: 15.3/km^{2} (39.7/sq mi)
- Time zone: UTC+01:00 (CET)
  - Summer (DST): UTC+02:00 (CEST)
- INSEE/Postal code: 86197 /86200
- ^{1} French Land Register data, which excludes lakes, ponds, glaciers > 1 km^{2} (0.386 sq mi or 247 acres) and river estuaries.

Pouant (French pronunciation: [pwɑ̃]) is a commune in the Vienne department in the Nouvelle-Aquitaine region in western France.

== Demographics ==
Historical population
| Year | Pop. | ±% p.a. |
|---|---|---|
| 1968 | 534 | — |
| 1975 | 512 | −0.60% |
| 1982 | 517 | +0.14% |
| 1990 | 510 | −0.17% |
| 1999 | 515 | +0.11% |
| 2007 | 427 | −2.32% |
| 2012 | 395 | −1.55% |
| 2017 | 413 | +0.90% |
| 2023 | 407 | −0.24% |
Source: INSEE

== See also ==
- Communes of the Vienne department
- Le Chêne Billault
