= Curçay-sur-Dive =

- Commune
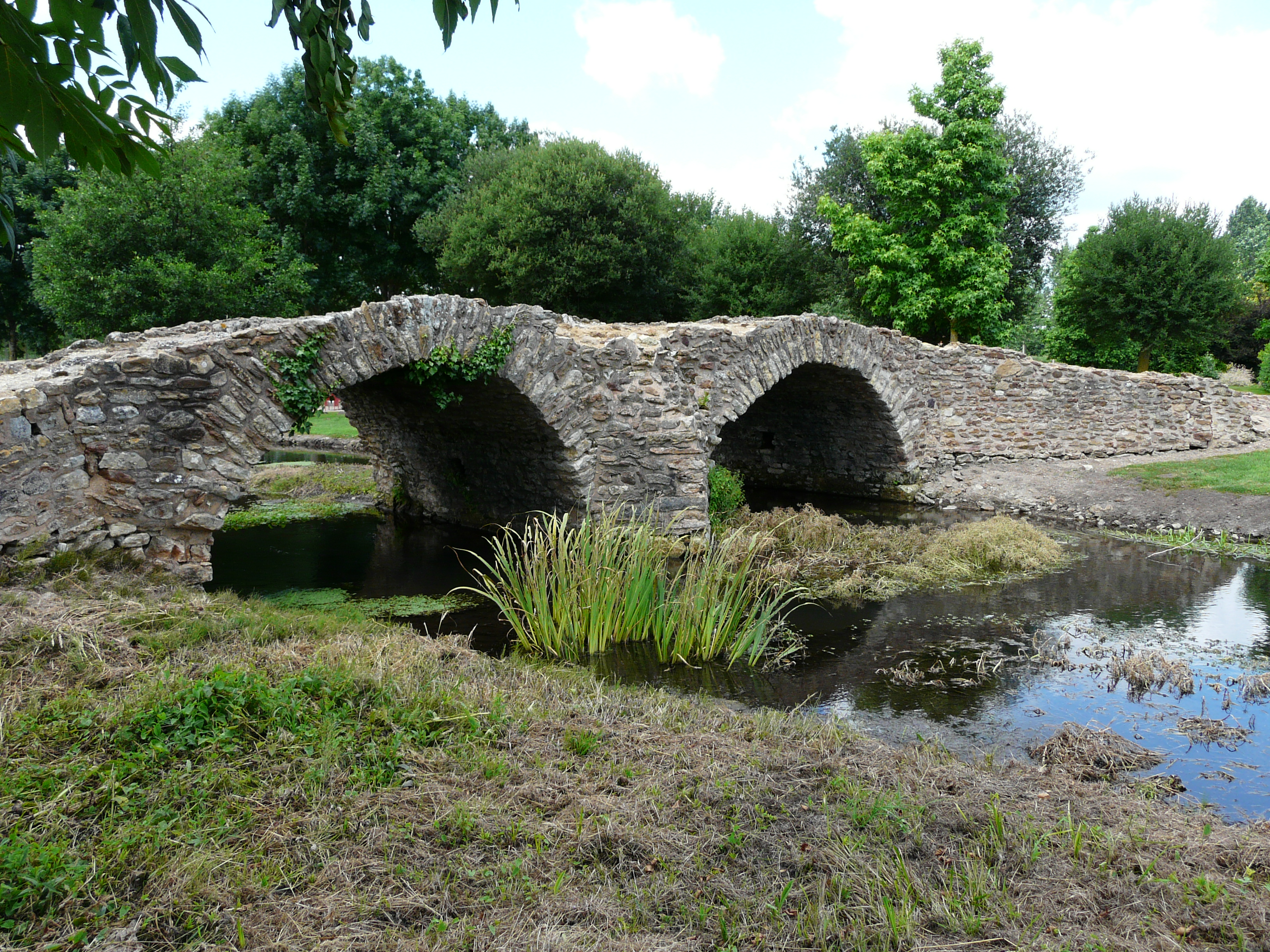
- The medieval pont Reine Blanche

- Coat of arms
- Location of Curçay-sur-Dive
- Location within France Location within Nouvelle-Aquitaine
- Coordinates: 47°00′45″N 0°03′20″W
- Country: France
- Region: Nouvelle-Aquitaine
- Department: Vienne
- Arrondissement: Châtellerault
- Canton: Loudun
- Intercommunality: Pays Loudunais

Government
  - Mayor (2020–2026): Bruno Lefebvre
- Area^{1}: 15.79 km^{2} (6.10 sq mi)
- Elevation: 197 m (646 ft)
- Highest elevation: 122 m (400 ft)
- Lowest elevation: 39 m (128 ft)
- Population (2023): 224
  - Density: 14.2/km^{2} (36.7/sq mi)
- Time zone: UTC+01:00 (CET)
  - Summer (DST): UTC+02:00 (CEST)
- INSEE/Postal code: 86090 /86120
- ^{1} French Land Register data, which excludes lakes, ponds, glaciers > 1 km^{2} (0.386 sq mi or 247 acres) and river estuaries.

Curçay-sur-Dive (French pronunciation: [kyʁsɛ syʁ div], literally Curçay on Dive) is a commune in the Vienne department in the Nouvelle-Aquitaine region in western France.

== History ==
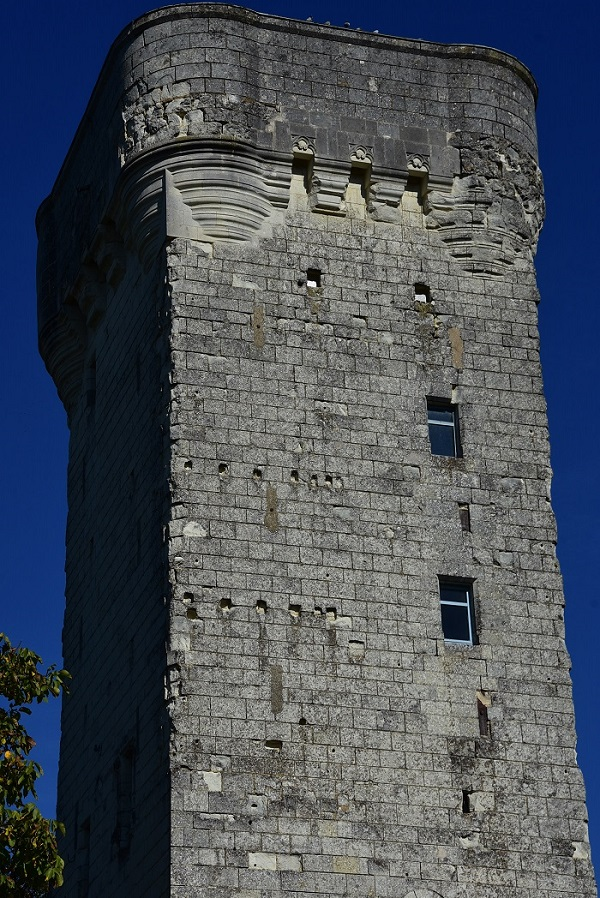
Keep (14th c.), seen up close

Curçay grew up where the Dive could be forded; the ford was replaced at an early time by the Gallo-Roman bridge that in medieval times came to be ascribed to the intervention of Queen Blanche.

== Demographics ==
Historical population
Year	Pop.	±% p.a.
1968	287	—
1975	216	−3.98%
1982	245	+1.82%
1990	257	+0.60%
1999	217	−1.86%
2007	235	+1.00%
2012	217	−1.58%
2017	213	−0.37%
2023	224	+0.84%
Source: INSEE

== See also ==
- Communes of the Vienne department
