= Moncontour, Vienne =

Moncontour
- Commune
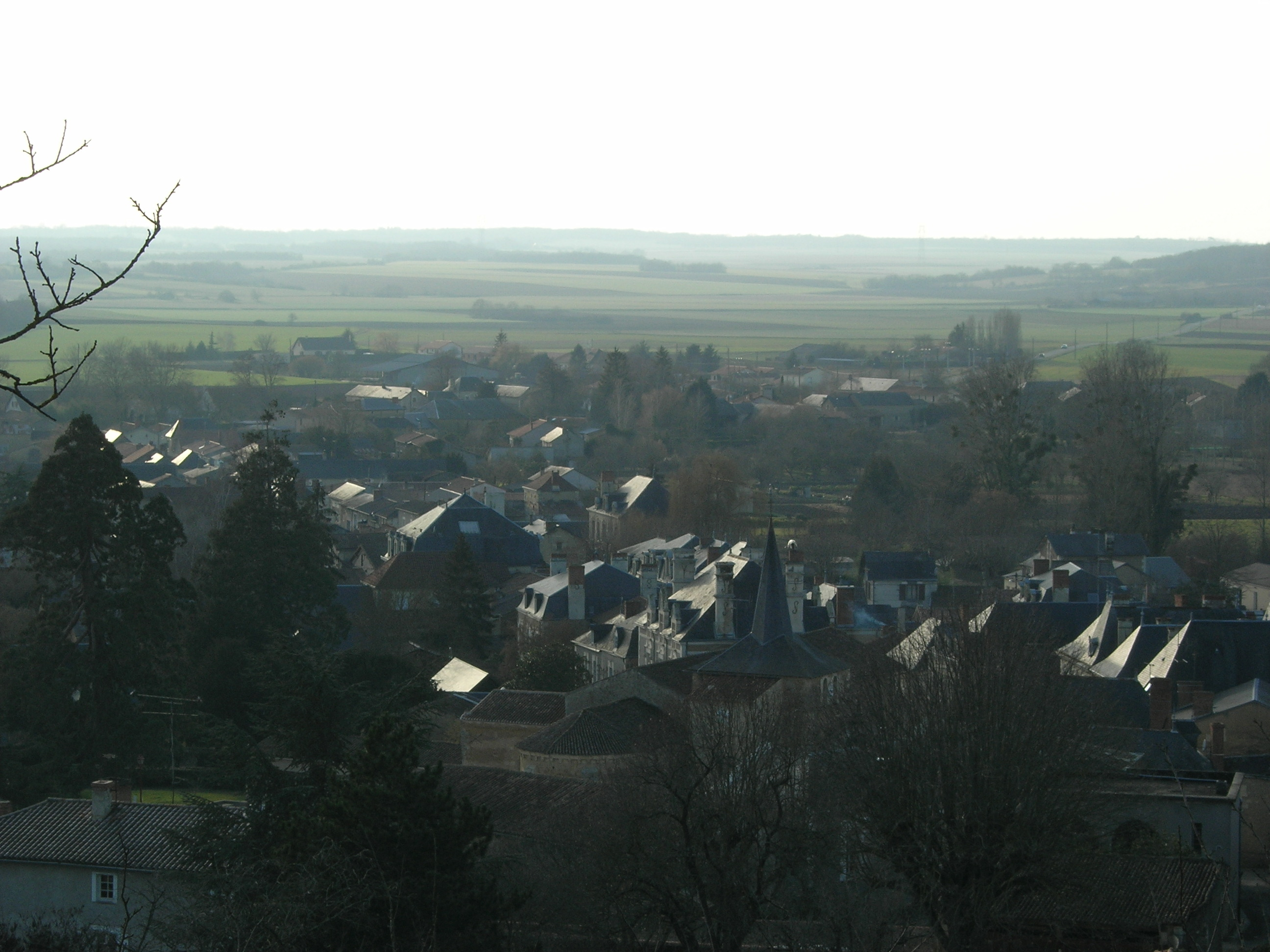
- The village of Moncontour

- Coat of arms
- Location of Moncontour
- Location within France Location within Nouvelle-Aquitaine
- Coordinates: 46°52′57″N 0°00′57″W
- Country: France
- Region: Nouvelle-Aquitaine
- Department: Vienne
- Arrondissement: Châtellerault
- Canton: Loudun

Government
  - Mayor (2020–2026): Édouard Renaud
- Area^{1}: 41.06 km^{2} (15.85 sq mi)
- Elevation: 70 m (230 ft)
- Highest elevation: 115 m (377 ft)
- Lowest elevation: 51 m (167 ft)
- Population (2023): 976
  - Density: 23.8/km^{2} (61.6/sq mi)
- Time zone: UTC+01:00 (CET)
  - Summer (DST): UTC+02:00 (CEST)
- INSEE/Postal code: 86161 /86330
- ^{1} French Land Register data, which excludes lakes, ponds, glaciers > 1 km^{2} (0.386 sq mi or 247 acres) and river estuaries.

Moncontour (French pronunciation: [mɔ̃kɔ̃tuʁ]) is a commune in the Vienne department in the Nouvelle-Aquitaine region in western France.

It was the site of the Battle of Moncontour in 1569.

== Notable people ==
The composer Raymond Vaillant was born here on 21 January 1935.

Politician Maria Rabaté was born in Moncontour, on 3 July 1900.

== Demographics ==
Historical population
Year	Pop.	±% p.a.
1968	1,171	—
1975	1,061	−1.40%
1982	1,036	−0.34%
1990	929	−1.35%
1999	980	+0.60%
2007	1,013	+0.41%
2012	978	−0.70%
2017	986	+0.16%
2023	976	−0.17%
Source: INSEE

== Sites and monuments ==
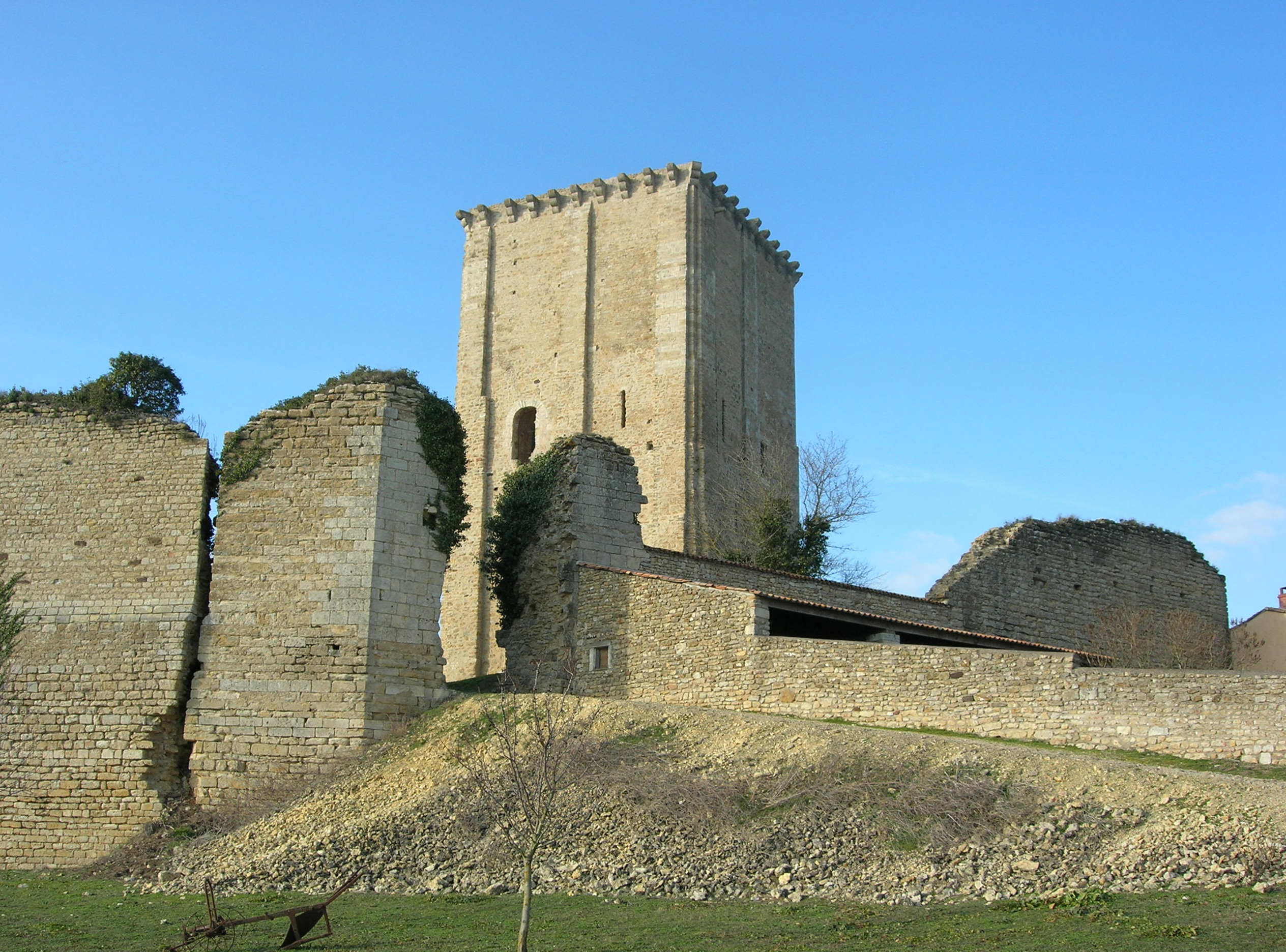
Moncontour keep

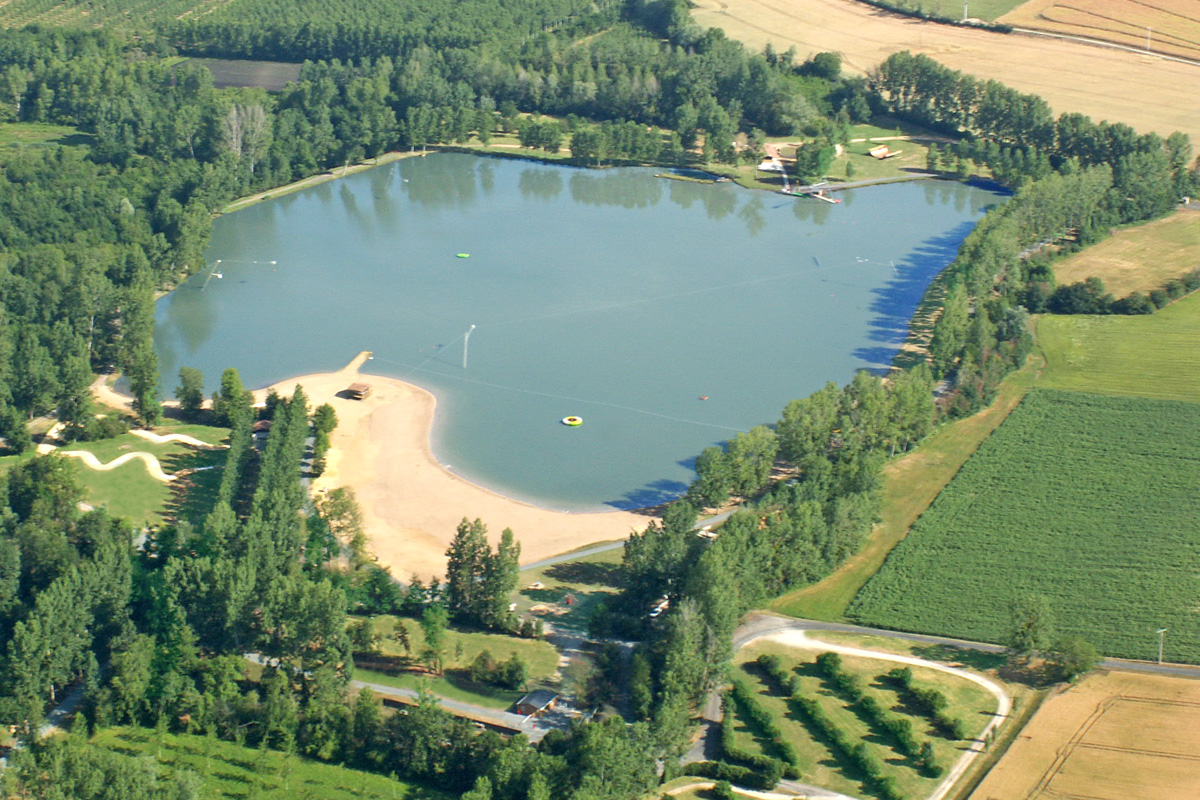
Lake of Moncontour

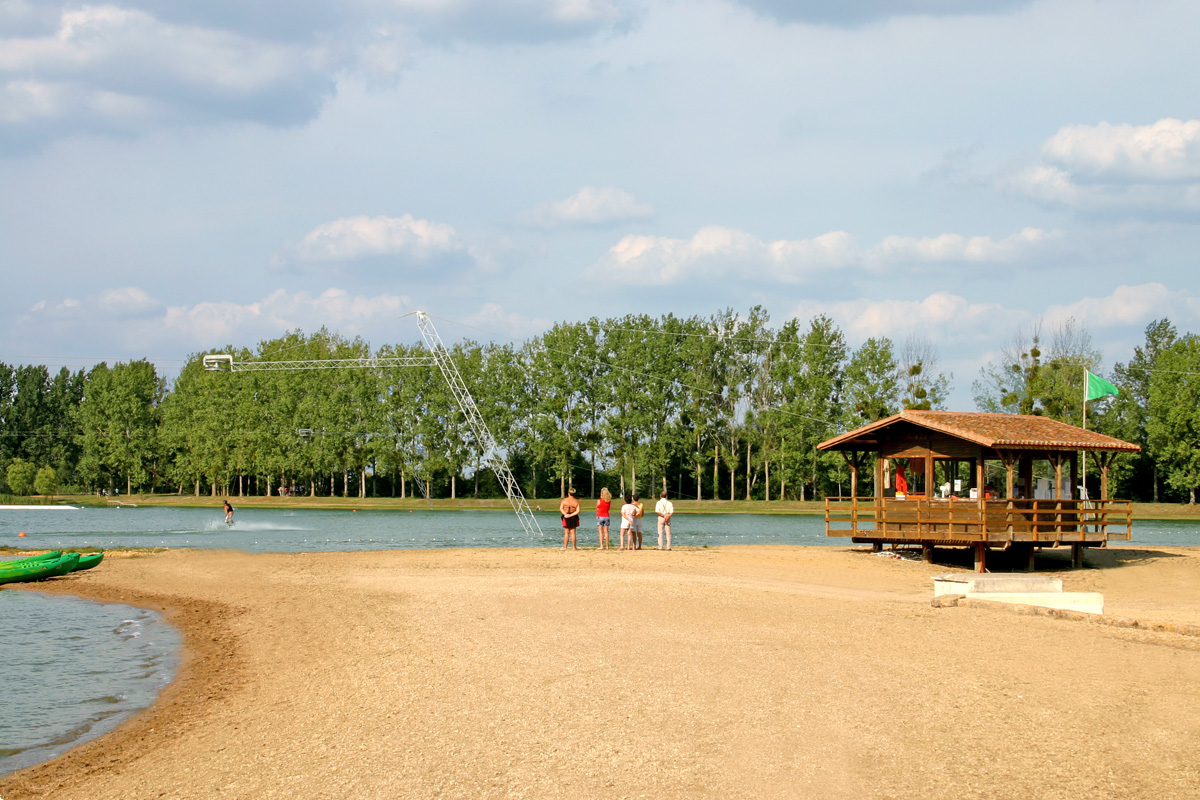
Recreation spot, built in 2006

== See also ==
- Communes of the Vienne department
