= La Chaussée, Vienne =

La Chaussée
- Commune
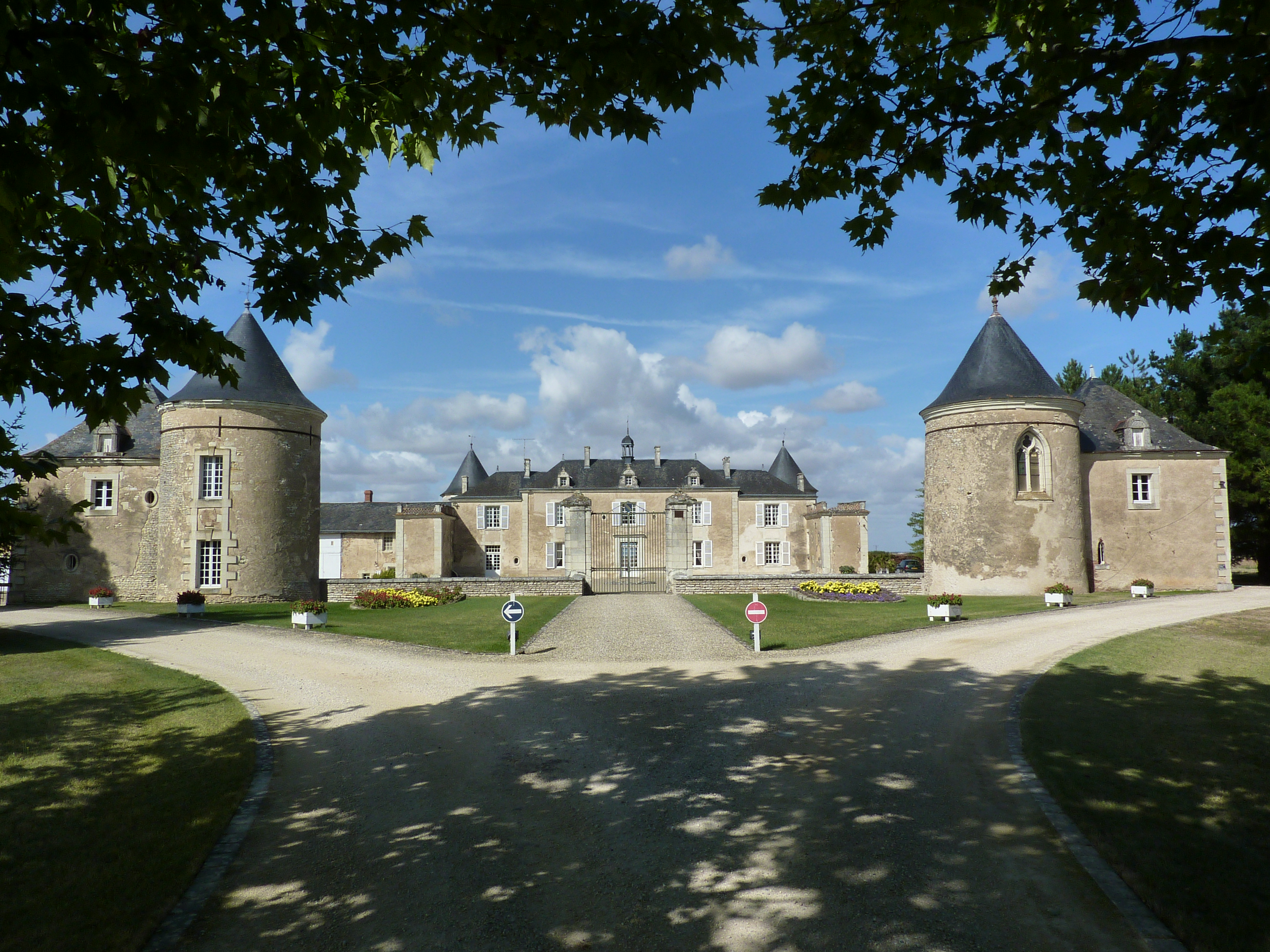
- The Château de la Bonnetière, in La Chaussée

- Coat of arms
- Location of La Chaussée
- Location within France Location within Nouvelle-Aquitaine
- Coordinates: 46°53′11″N 0°06′41″E
- Country: France
- Region: Nouvelle-Aquitaine
- Department: Vienne
- Arrondissement: Châtellerault
- Canton: Loudun
- Intercommunality: Pays Loudunais

Government
  - Mayor (2020–2026): Alain Legrand
- Area^{1}: 13.58 km^{2} (5.24 sq mi)
- Elevation: 100 m (330 ft)
- Highest elevation: 91 m (299 ft)
- Lowest elevation: 72 m (236 ft)
- Population (2023): 189
  - Density: 13.9/km^{2} (36.0/sq mi)
- Time zone: UTC+01:00 (CET)
  - Summer (DST): UTC+02:00 (CEST)
- INSEE/Postal code: 86069 /86330
- ^{1} French Land Register data, which excludes lakes, ponds, glaciers > 1 km^{2} (0.386 sq mi or 247 acres) and river estuaries.

La Chaussée (French pronunciation: [la ʃose]) is a commune in the Vienne department in the Nouvelle-Aquitaine region in western France.

== Demographics ==
Historical population
Year	Pop.	±% p.a.
1968	233	—
1975	191	−2.80%
1982	201	+0.73%
1990	193	−0.51%
1999	179	−0.83%
2007	163	−1.16%
2012	188	+2.89%
2017	182	−0.65%
2023	189	+0.63%
Source: INSEE

== See also ==
- Communes of the Vienne department
