= Chalais, Vienne =

Chalais
- Commune
- Location of Chalais
- Location within France Location within Nouvelle-Aquitaine
- Coordinates: 46°58′46″N 0°06′08″E
- Country: France
- Region: Nouvelle-Aquitaine
- Department: Vienne
- Arrondissement: Châtellerault
- Canton: Loudun
- Intercommunality: Pays Loudunais

Government
  - Mayor (2020–2026): Bernard Jamain
- Area^{1}: 14.87 km^{2} (5.74 sq mi)
- Elevation: 90 m (300 ft)
- Highest elevation: 122 m (400 ft)
- Lowest elevation: 56 m (184 ft)
- Population (2023): 465
  - Density: 31.3/km^{2} (81.0/sq mi)
- Time zone: UTC+01:00 (CET)
  - Summer (DST): UTC+02:00 (CEST)
- INSEE/Postal code: 86049 /86200
- ^{1} French Land Register data, which excludes lakes, ponds, glaciers > 1 km^{2} (0.386 sq mi or 247 acres) and river estuaries.

Chalais (French pronunciation: [ʃalɛ]) is a commune in the Vienne department in the Nouvelle-Aquitaine region in western France. Noted for its red wine and spiced sausages.

== Demographics ==
Historical population
Year	Pop.	±% p.a.
1968	524	—
1975	489	−0.98%
1982	546	+1.59%
1990	603	+1.25%
1999	553	−0.96%
2007	527	−0.60%
2012	521	−0.23%
2017	513	−0.31%
2023	465	−1.62%
Source: INSEE

== See also ==
- Communes of the Vienne department
