= Craon, Vienne =

Craon
- Commune
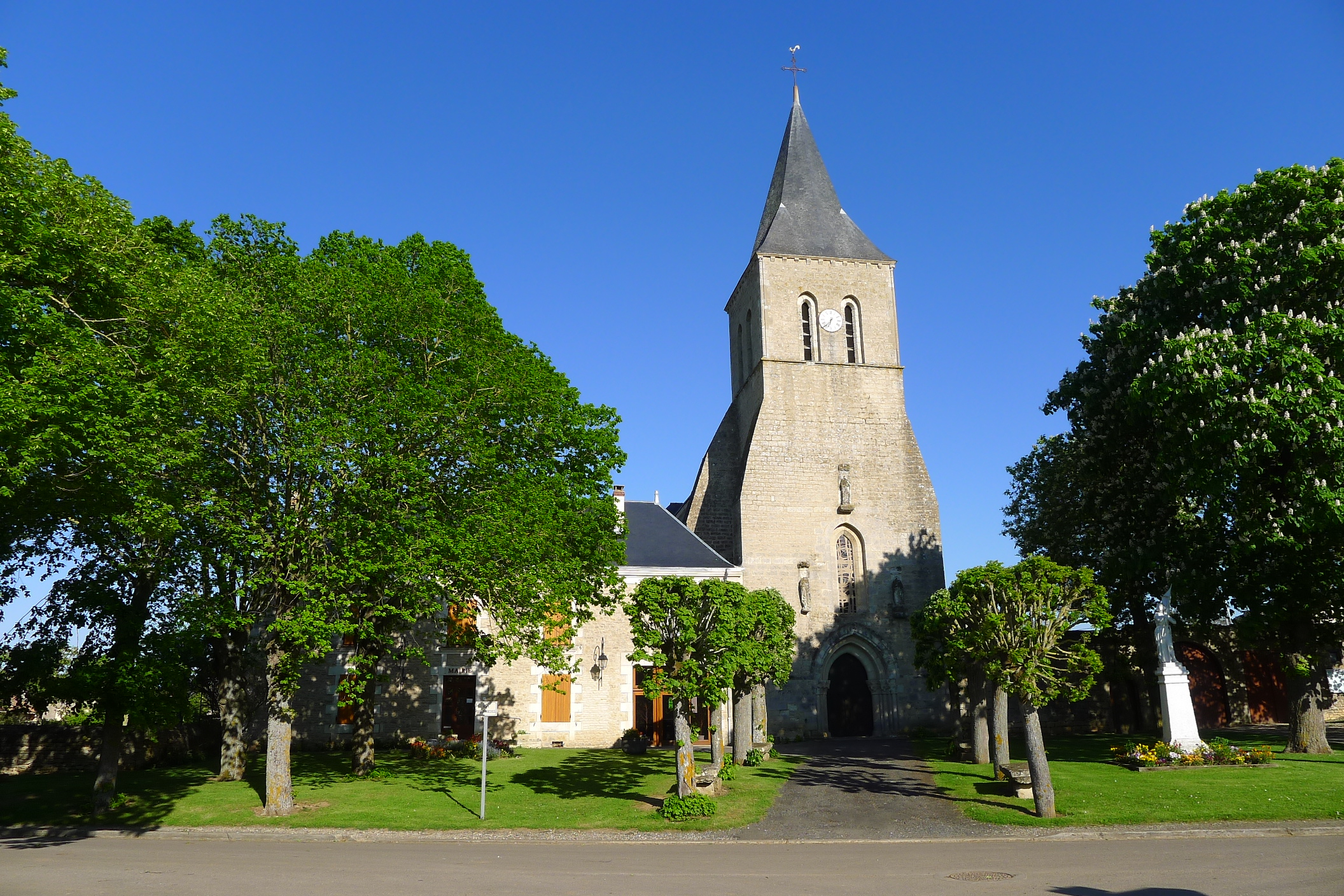
- The church of Saint-Michel, in Craon
- Location of Craon
- Location within France Location within Nouvelle-Aquitaine
- Coordinates: 46°46′27″N 0°01′28″E
- Country: France
- Region: Nouvelle-Aquitaine
- Department: Vienne
- Arrondissement: Châtellerault
- Canton: Loudun
- Intercommunality: Pays Loudunais

Government
  - Mayor (2020–2026): Evelyne Valencon
- Area^{1}: 21.58 km^{2} (8.33 sq mi)
- Elevation: 148 m (486 ft)
- Highest elevation: 142 m (466 ft)
- Lowest elevation: 83 m (272 ft)
- Population (2023): 183
  - Density: 8.48/km^{2} (22.0/sq mi)
- Time zone: UTC+01:00 (CET)
  - Summer (DST): UTC+02:00 (CEST)
- INSEE/Postal code: 86087 /86110
- ^{1} French Land Register data, which excludes lakes, ponds, glaciers > 1 km^{2} (0.386 sq mi or 247 acres) and river estuaries.

Craon (French pronunciation: [kʁɑ̃]) is a commune in the Vienne department in the Nouvelle-Aquitaine region in western France.

== Demographics ==
Historical population
Year	Pop.	±% p.a.
1968	324	—
1975	294	−1.38%
1982	243	−2.68%
1990	213	−1.63%
1999	196	−0.92%
2007	198	+0.13%
2012	189	−0.93%
2017	186	−0.32%
2023	183	−0.27%
Source: INSEE

== See also ==
- Communes of the Vienne department
