= Nueil-sous-Faye =

- Commune
- Location of Nueil-sous-Faye
- Location within France Location within Nouvelle-Aquitaine
- Coordinates: 46°58′48″N 0°16′51″E
- Country: France
- Region: Nouvelle-Aquitaine
- Department: Vienne
- Arrondissement: Châtellerault
- Canton: Loudun
- Intercommunality: Pays Loudunais

Government
  - Mayor (2020–2026): François Pean
- Area^{1}: 15.99 km^{2} (6.17 sq mi)
- Elevation: 70 m (230 ft)
- Highest elevation: 116 m (381 ft)
- Lowest elevation: 54 m (177 ft)
- Population (2023): 217
  - Density: 13.6/km^{2} (35.1/sq mi)
- Time zone: UTC+01:00 (CET)
  - Summer (DST): UTC+02:00 (CEST)
- INSEE/Postal code: 86181 /86200
- ^{1} French Land Register data, which excludes lakes, ponds, glaciers > 1 km^{2} (0.386 sq mi or 247 acres) and river estuaries.

Nueil-sous-Faye (French pronunciation: [nɥɛj su fɛ], literally Nueil under Faye) is a commune in the Vienne department in the Nouvelle-Aquitaine region in western France.

== Demographics ==
Historical population
Year	Pop.	±% p.a.
1968	332	—
1975	312	−0.88%
1982	274	−1.84%
1990	241	−1.59%
1999	228	−0.61%
2007	246	+0.95%
2012	251	+0.40%
2017	213	−3.23%
2023	217	+0.31%
Source: INSEE

== See also ==
- Communes of the Vienne department
