= Ranton, Vienne =

Ranton
- Commune
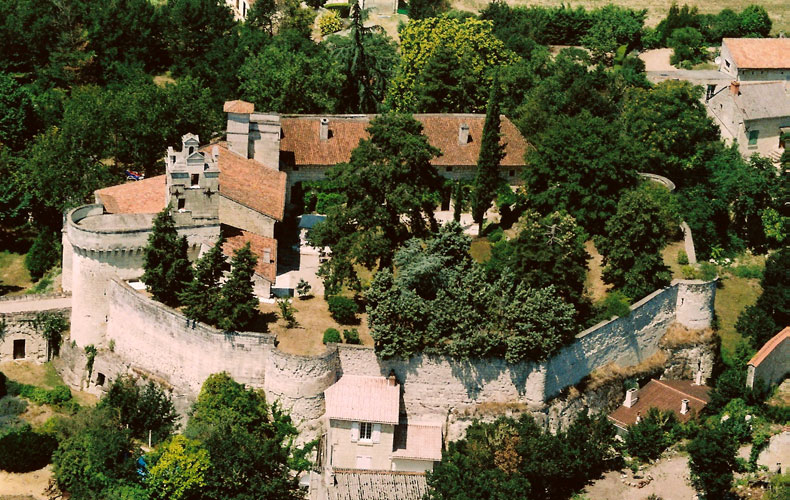
- The Chateau of Ranton

- Coat of arms
- Location of Ranton
- Location within France Location within Nouvelle-Aquitaine
- Coordinates: 47°00′03″N 0°01′39″W
- Country: France
- Region: Nouvelle-Aquitaine
- Department: Vienne
- Arrondissement: Châtellerault
- Canton: Loudun
- Intercommunality: Pays Loudunais

Government
  - Mayor (2020–2026): Pascal Brault
- Area^{1}: 6.07 km^{2} (2.34 sq mi)
- Elevation: 122 m (400 ft)
- Highest elevation: 123 m (404 ft)
- Lowest elevation: 45 m (148 ft)
- Population (2023): 204
  - Density: 33.6/km^{2} (87.0/sq mi)
- Time zone: UTC+01:00 (CET)
  - Summer (DST): UTC+02:00 (CEST)
- INSEE/Postal code: 86205 /86200
- ^{1} French Land Register data, which excludes lakes, ponds, glaciers > 1 km^{2} (0.386 sq mi or 247 acres) and river estuaries.

Ranton (French pronunciation: [ʁɑ̃tɔ̃]) is a commune in the Vienne department in the Nouvelle-Aquitaine region in western France.

== Demographics ==
Historical population
Year	Pop.	±% p.a.
1968	227	—
1975	219	−0.51%
1982	174	−3.23%
1990	195	+1.43%
1999	202	+0.39%
2007	192	−0.63%
2012	183	−0.96%
2017	193	+1.07%
2023	204	+0.93%
Source: INSEE

== See also ==
- Communes of the Vienne department
