= Sianna =

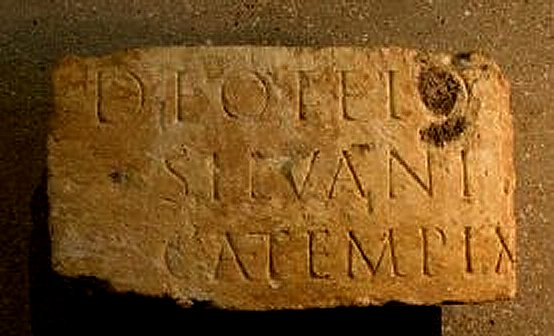
The fragment with the words "Deo Telo"

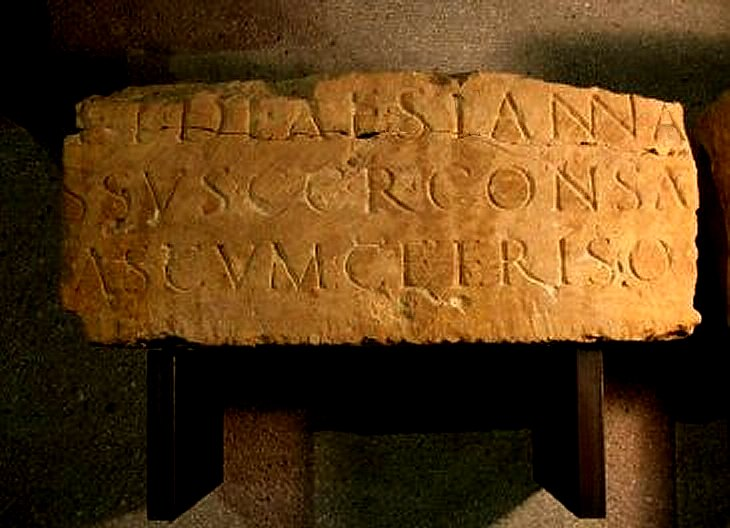
The fragment with the words "Deae Si(t)anna[e]"

Sianna or Stanna is a Romano-Celtic goddess from Roman Gaul, attested epigraphically from Vesunna (present-day Périgueux).

== Inscriptions ==
The goddess Sianna is attested by an inscription composed of five fragments discovered in the buildings of the Vieilles Casernes or ‘old barracks’ in Périgueux (Dordogne), in the ancient territory of the Petrocorii, where she is partnered with the god Telo. By comparison of the various fragments, the suggested restoration is certain, except for the end of the first line and the beginning of the second line: Deo Telo et deae Stannae, solo A(uli) Pomp(eii) Antiqui, Per…ius, Silvani fil(ius) Bassus, c(urator) c(ivium) r(omanorum), consaeptum omne circa templum et basilicas duas, cum ceteris ornamentis ac munimentis, dat, which Noémie Beck translates as, ‘To the god Telo and to the goddess Stanna, Per[…]ius Bassus, son of Silvanus, curator of the Roman citizens, offers, at his own expense, this entire wall erected around their temple on the land of Aulus Pompeius Antiquus, and these two basilicas with the other embellishments and accessories’. This inscription is of great interest, for it mentions the existence of a temple dedicated to Telo and Stanna. The dedicator Per[…]rius Bassus was a Roman citizen and held official functions. He was a curator, which means he had been appointed by the emperor to manage and supervise the finances of the city. He offered a wall, two basilicas, ornaments and accessories extending and embellishing the sanctuary, which was built on the property of the Roman citizen Aulus Pompeius Antiquus. Sianna and Vesunna are two goddesses from the town of Périgueux in the territory of the Petrocorii.

== Name ==
In Lugdunum, Sianna underwent interpretatio romana and was referred to as "Apollinem Siannum" by the Romans.
