= Périgueux Cathedral =

Catholic church in Périgueux, France

Coordinates: 45°11′1″N 0°43′22″E

Périgueux Cathedral Cathédrale Saint-Front de Périgueux
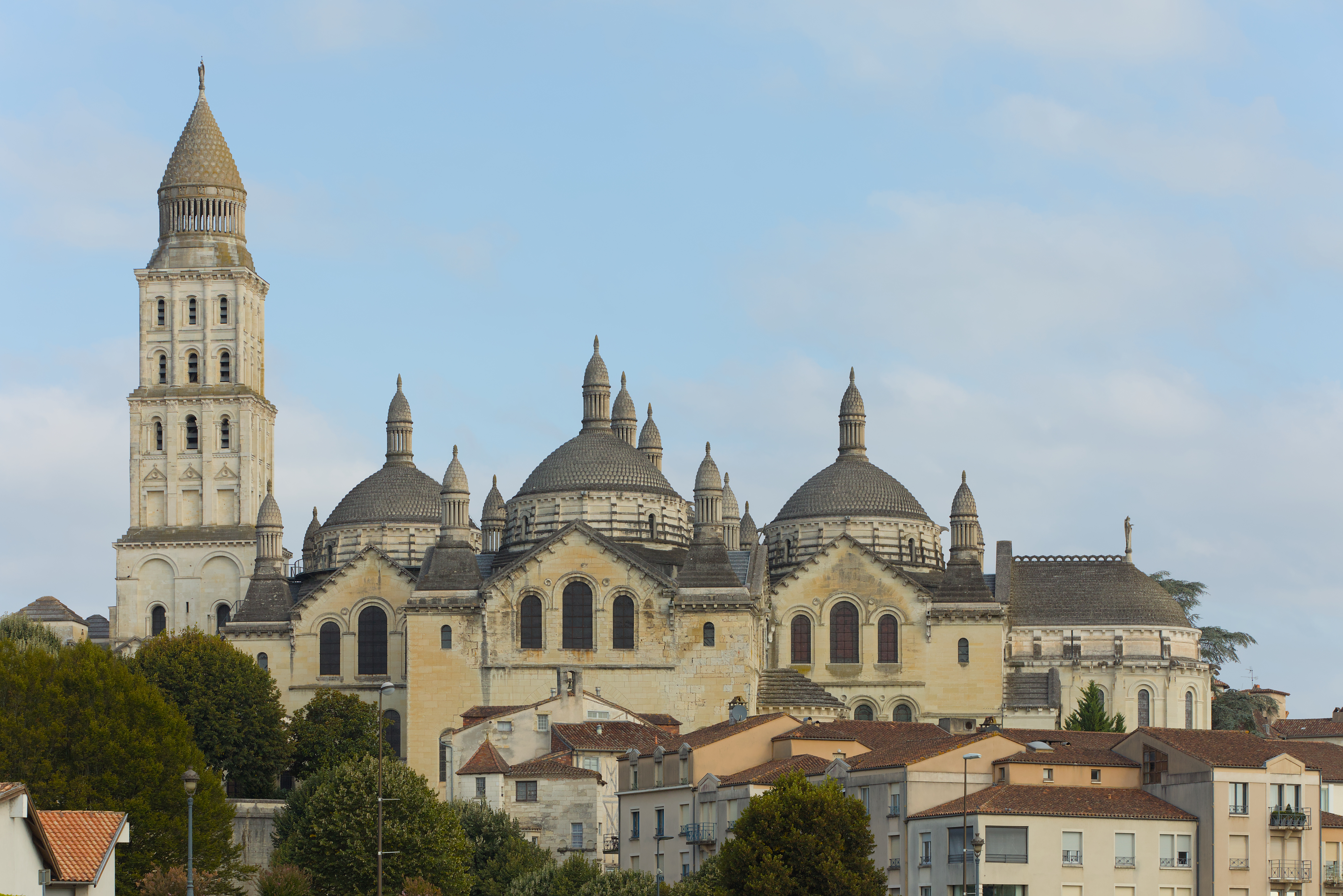
- St. Front's Cathedral, Périgueux

Religion
- Affiliation: Catholic Church
- Province: Bishop of Périgueux and Sarlat
- Region: Dordogne
- Rite: Latin
- Ecclesiastical or organisational status: Cathedral
- Status: Active

Location
- Location: Périgueux, France
- Interactive map of Périgueux Cathedral; Cathédrale Saint-Front de Périgueux

Architecture
- Type: church
- Style: Romanesque
- Groundbreaking: 10th century
- Completed: 19th century

Périgueux Cathedral is a Catholic church located in the city of Périgueux, France. A cathedral since 1669, it is dedicated to Saint Front (French: Cathédrale Saint-Front de Périgueux). The cathedral's predecessor, still in operation as a church, is dedicated to Saint Stephen (French: Cathédrale Saint-Étienne-de-la-Cité de Périgueux).

The cathedral is the seat of the Bishop of Périgueux and Sarlat, as the diocese has been known since 1854. It is part of the World Heritage Sites of the Routes of Santiago de Compostela in France.

== Saint Front ==
The cathedral owes its name to Saint Front, the first bishop of Périgueux. According to the "Vie de Saint Front", he lived in the fourth century, was ordained in Rome, and came to evangelize the Perigord. He was buried near his hermitage, just outside the Roman city of Vesunna.

== History ==
A chapel was first built on the site in the 4th or 5th century. In 976 the Bishop Frotaire had the Abbey of Saint-Front constructed on the site of the church. The abbey was consecrated in 1047. Its vaulted choir housed the tomb of Saint Front, which was sculpted in 1077 by Guimaunond, a monk of the Abbey of La Chaise-Dieu. This tomb was decorated with numerous precious stones and sculptures, notably an angel with a halo made of pieces of glass and is now kept in the Périgord Museum.

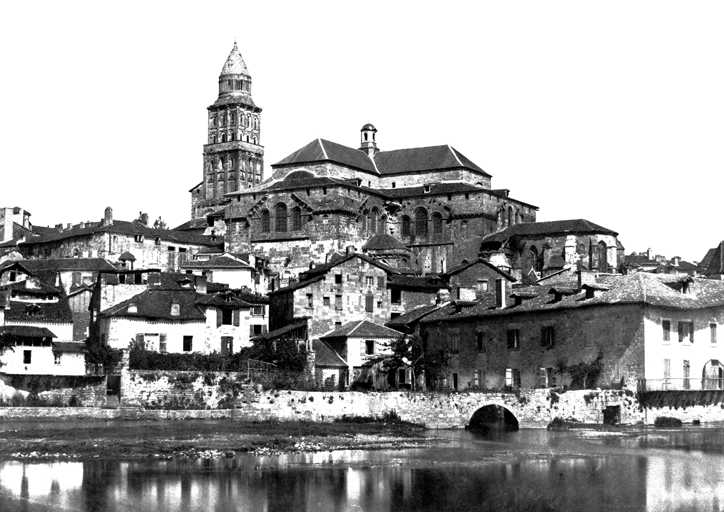
Saint-Front Cathedral before the restoration by Paul Abadie. Photo taken by Médéric Mieusement before 1893.

The abbey burned in 1120. Only part of the church and part of the Romanesque cloister on the south side remain.

The buildings are located in the centre of Périgueux and Saint Front Cathedral has been classed as a French Historical Monument (monument historique) since 1840. The Saint Front Cathedral was rebuilt by architect Paul Abadie from 1852 to 1895. Only the bell tower and the crypts, both from the 12th century, were left from the previous structures.

The cathedral is part of the World Heritage Sites of the Routes of Santiago de Compostela in France since 1998.

== Architecture ==
The Saint Front Cathedral was designed on the model of St. Mark's Basilica in Venice. The layout of the cathedral is in the form of a Greek cross. Its five domes with turrets show a direct architectural relationship with oriental religious buildings, which served as inspiration for the architects of Saint-Front Cathedral. The domes of Saint-Front Cathedral were once different in size, but were redesigned by architect Paul Abadie to have one size, and to be symmetrical. The pillars carrying the load of the superstructure are 6 meters wide. The domes are inaccessible to the public.

== Gallery ==
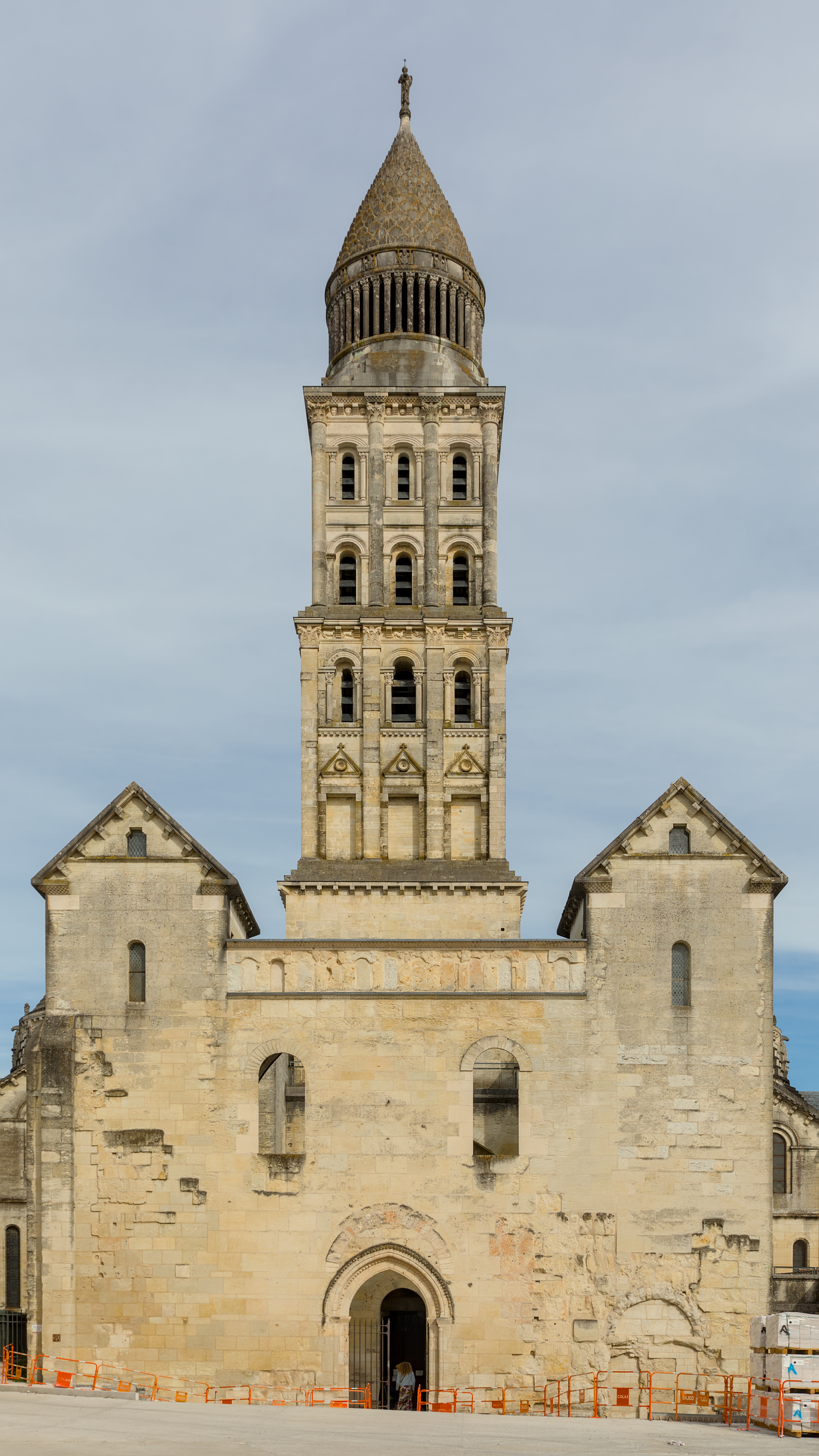
Main façade.

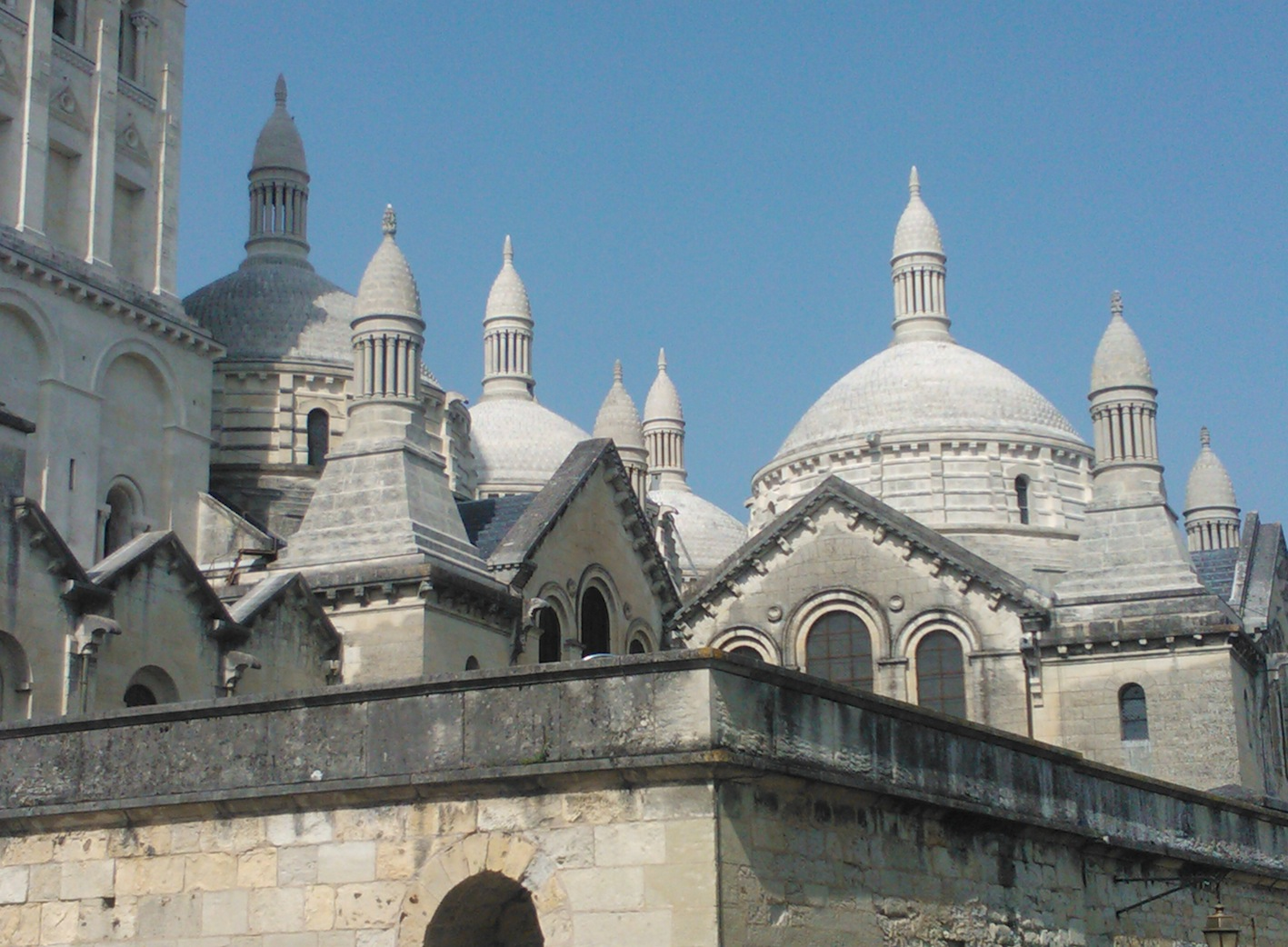
Domes and Turrets added on the Saint Front Cathedral by Paul Abadie in the mid-19th Century.

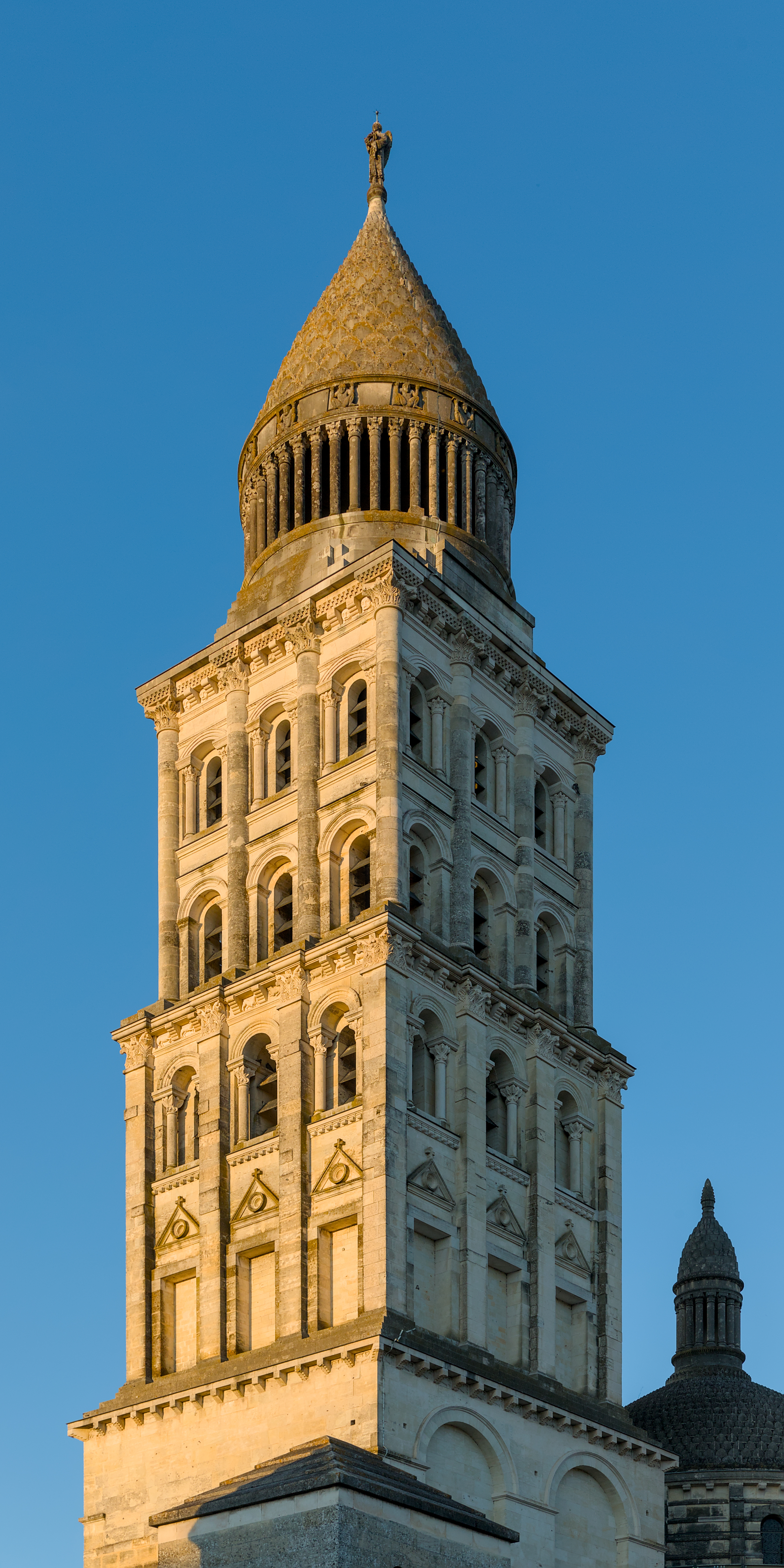
Bell tower.

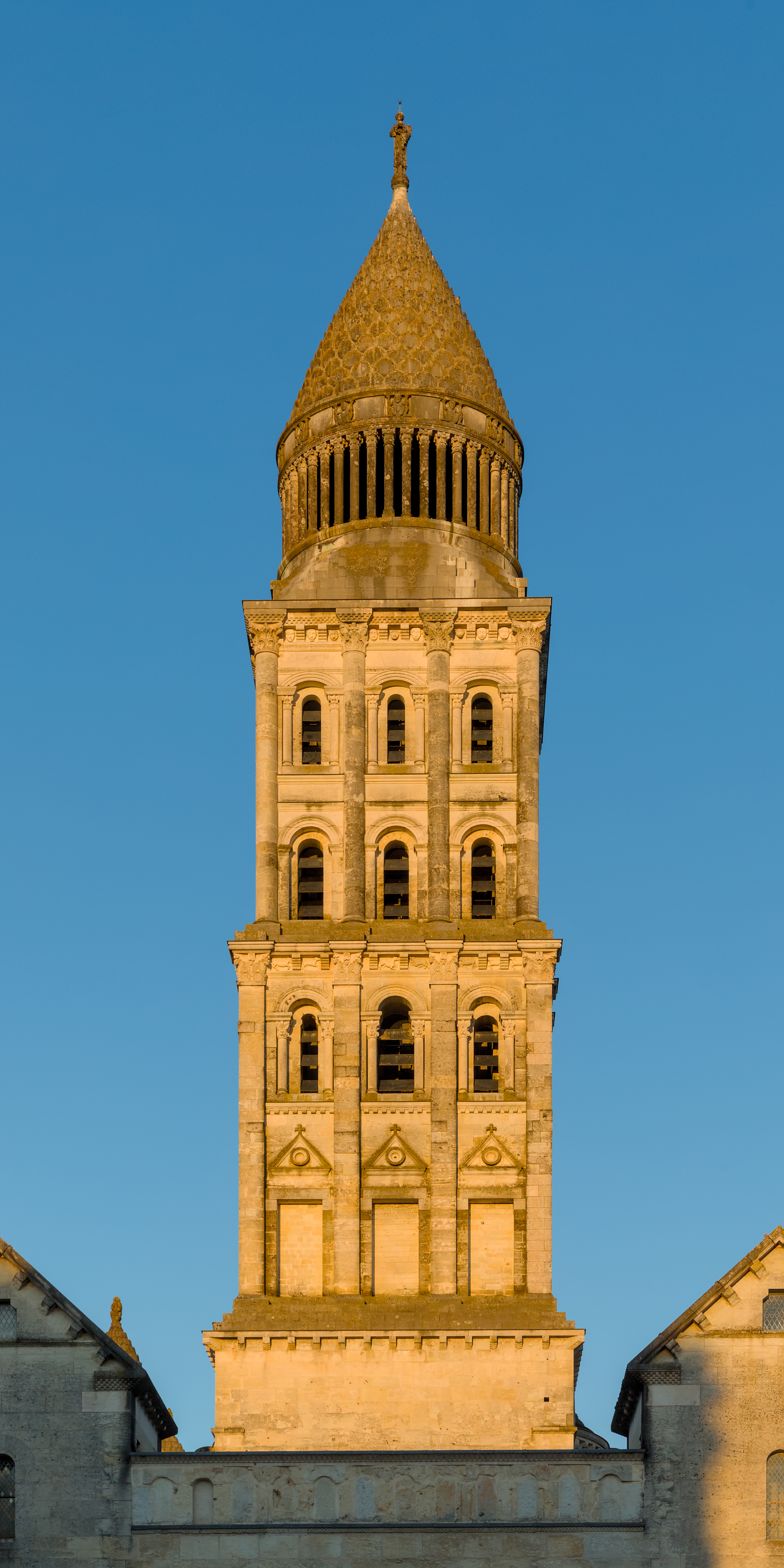
Bell tower.

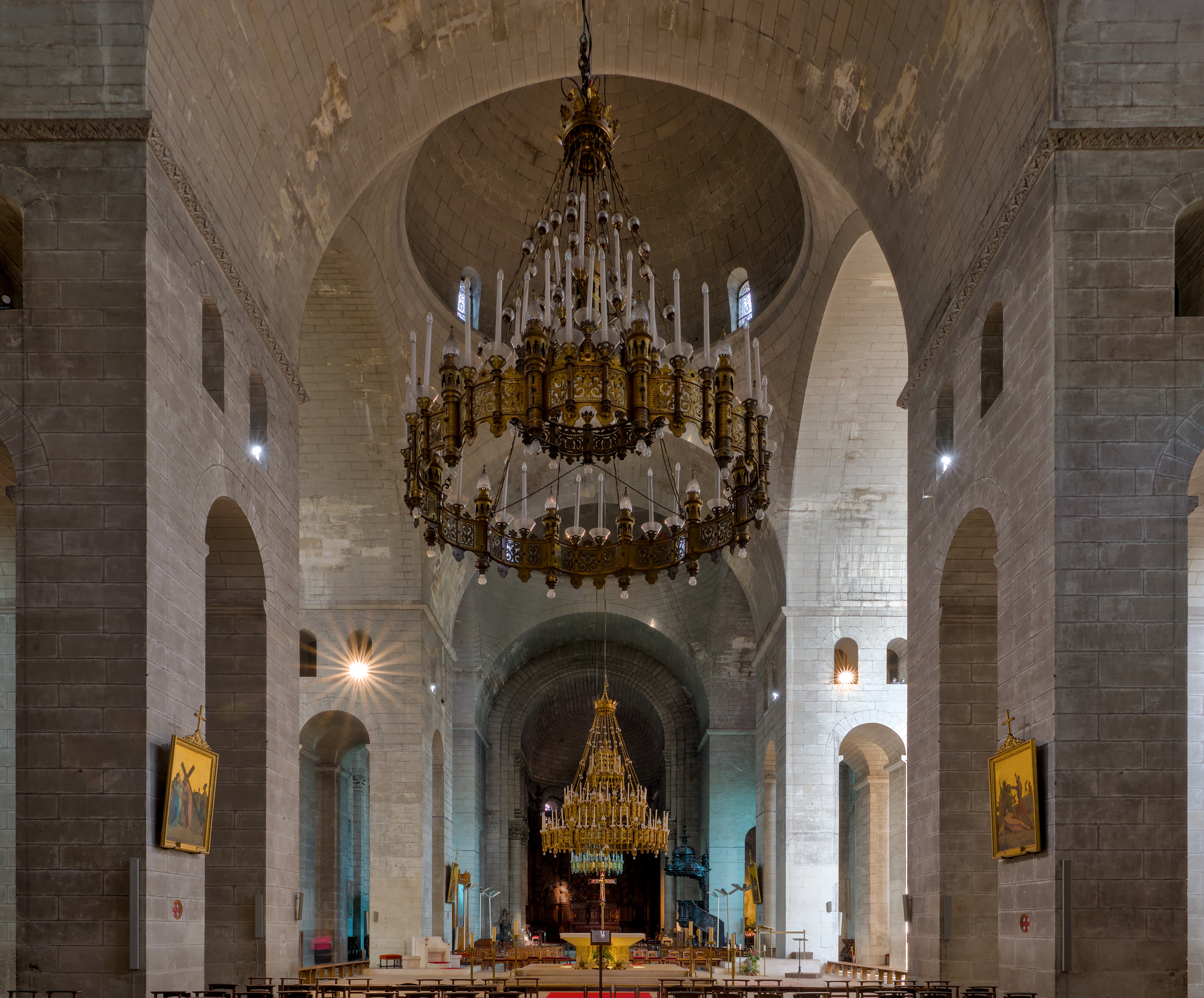
General view of the interior.

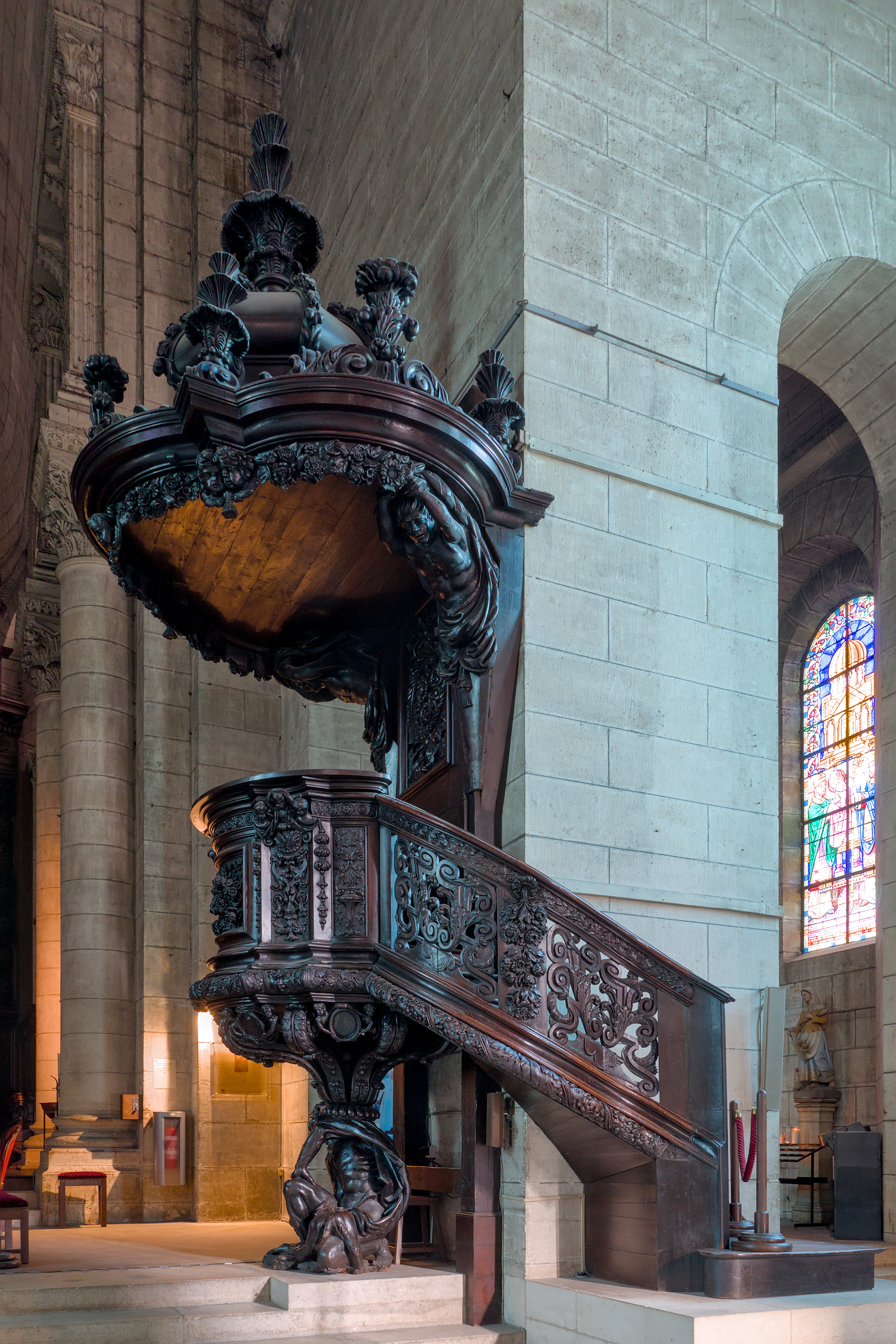
17th-century pulpit.

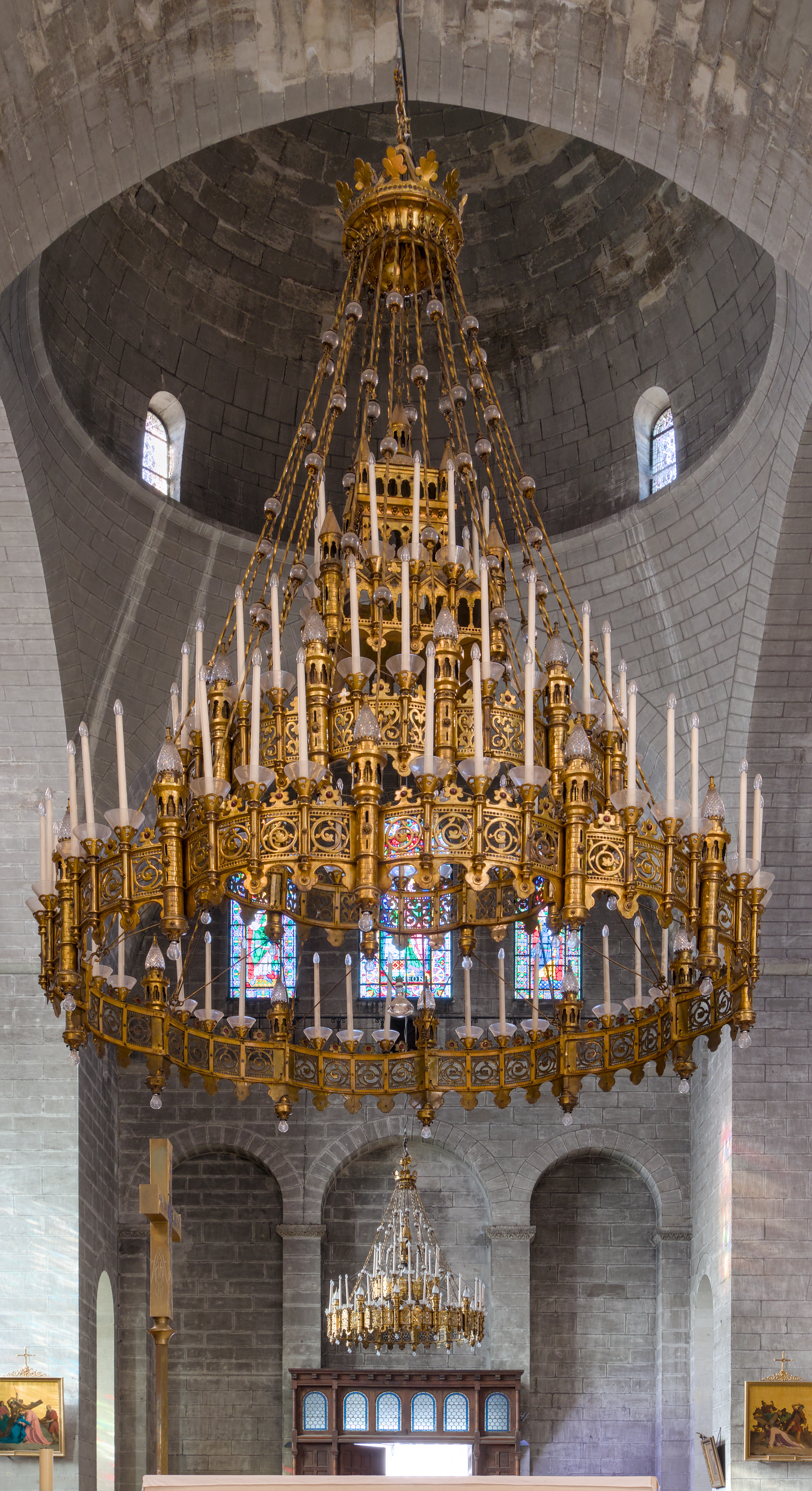
Central chandelier.

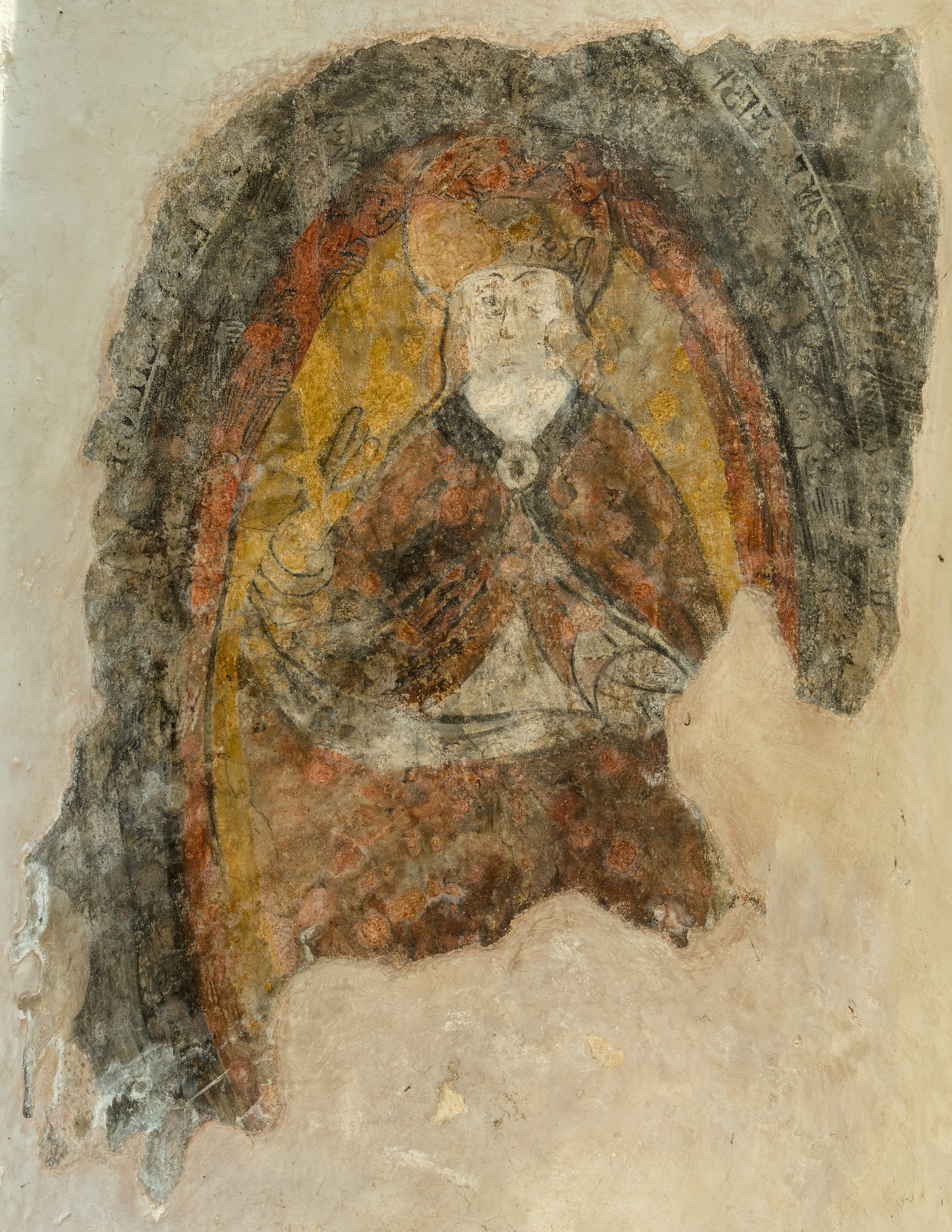
Remains of a 16th-century wall painting in a chapel of the south transept.

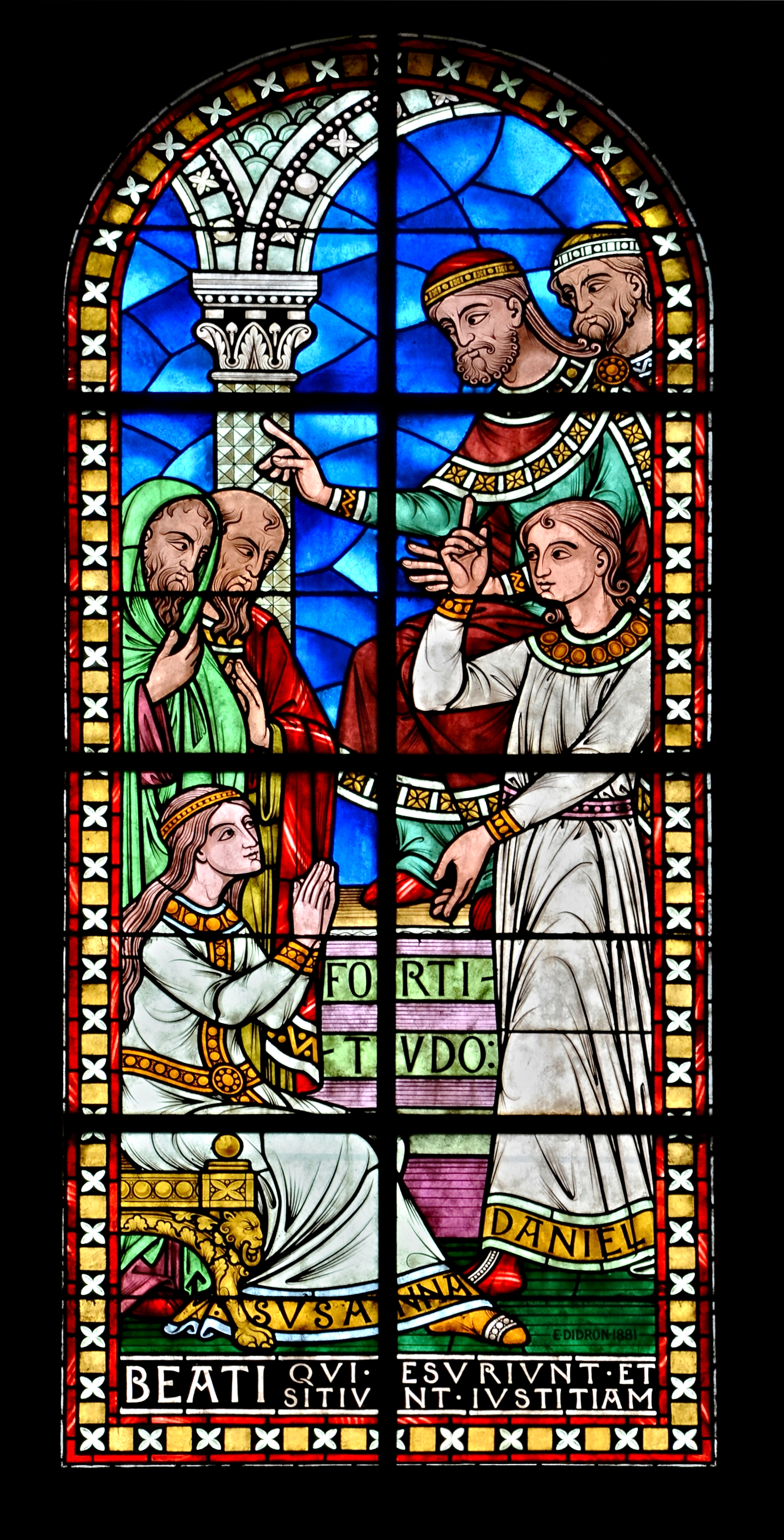
Susanna and the elders, stained-glass window (1881), by Edouard Didron, on the south wall of the cathedral.

== See also ==
- French Romanesque architecture
- High medieval domes

== Sources ==
- Catholic Hierarchy: Diocese of Périgueux-Sarlat
- Cathédrale Saint-Front at Structurae
