= Telo (mythology) =

Celtic god

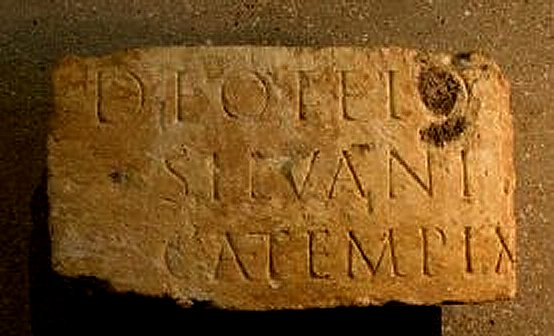
An inscription with the name of god Telo

Telo is a Celtic god, the eponymous spirit of Toulon in the Var. He was the deity of the sacred spring around which the ancient settlement sprang up. A series of dedications to Telo come from Périgueux: on three of these Telo is invoked with another deity or deities: the goddesses Sianna (in 3 inscriptions) and Vesunna (in one inscription).
