= Grignols =

Grignols is the name of several communes in France:

- Grignols, Dordogne, in the Dordogne department
- Grignols, Gironde, in the Gironde department
