= Château de Tiregand =

Château in Nouvelle-Aquitaine, France

Coordinates: 44°51′22″N 0°33′02″E

The Château de Tiregand is a French château located in the commune of Creysse, in the Dordogne department of the Nouvelle-Aquitaine region. It was built during the 18th and 19th centuries.

== Overview ==
The Château de Tiregand is situated in the Bergeracois area, in the south of the Dordogne department, approximately one kilometre west of the town center of Creysse. It is a private property; its terrace and gardens are open to the public from April to October.

The park overlooks the Dordogne (river) valley from a height of about 40 metres. The estate covers an area of 406 hectares. The château, outbuildings, park, terraces, moats, and rotunda were listed as historical monuments on 20 December 2002.

The 43-hectare vineyard on the estate produces Pécharmant wine. The wine cellars are located at the "Vieux Castel" (also known as the *Château Vieux*).

== History ==
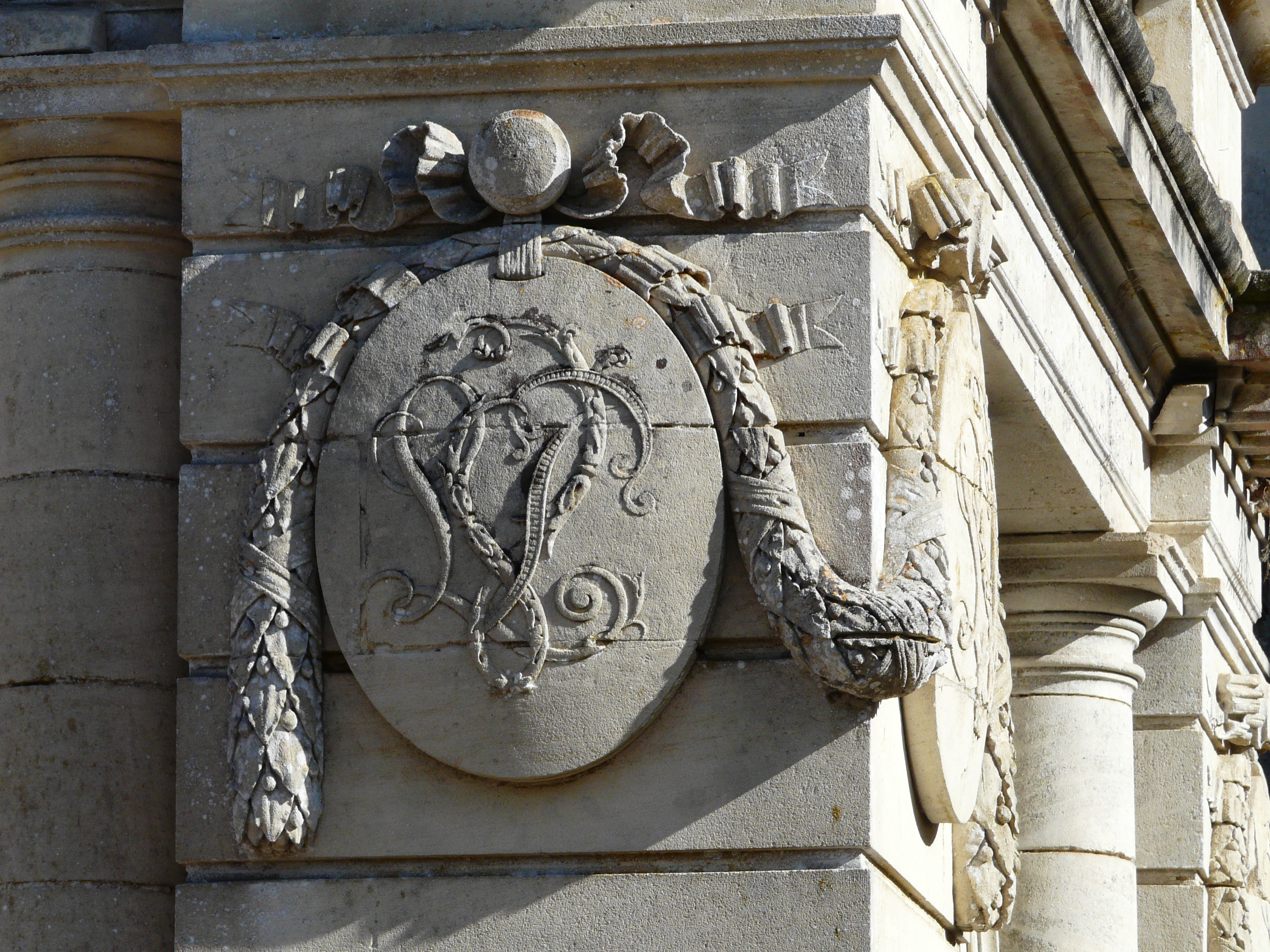
Intertwined letters LP, representing the de La Panouse family.

The original castle is believed to have been established in the 13th century by Edward Tyrgan, the illegitimate son of Henry III of England.

In 1575, the relics of Saint Front of Périgueux, stolen from Périgueux by Huguenots were brought to the castle before being cast into the Dordogne River.

The current castle was built in the 18th century at the behest of Jean Charles d'Augeard, a président à mortier (senior judge) at the Parlement of Bordeaux. The "Vieux Castel" (Old Castle) was subsequently converted into a wine cellar.

In 1826, Count Alexandre César de La Panouse a deputy for Paris from 1822 to 1827 purchased the château. He died at the estate in 1836.

His son, César Armand Anatole de La Panouse, had the eastern wing built; it features the family coat of arms as well as medallions displaying the intertwined letters "LP".

Through the marriage of Cécile de La Panouse—the family's last heiress to Hubert de Boutray in 1918, the château passed to the Boutray family and subsequently, through another marriage, to the Saint Exupéry family

In 2022, the Guyot family, already owners of the Bridoire and Château de Marzac châteaux in the Dordogne—purchased the château, the adjoining outbuildings, the dog training and equestrian clubs, and approximately forty hectares of land; of the estate's total area exceeding 400 hectares, the remainder, including 42 hectares of Pécharmant vineyard, was retained by the Saint-Exupéry family. The château is scheduled to open to the public starting in July 2022 · .
