= Château de Bridoire =

Château in Ribagnac, France

Coordinates: 44°46′05″N 0°27′31″E

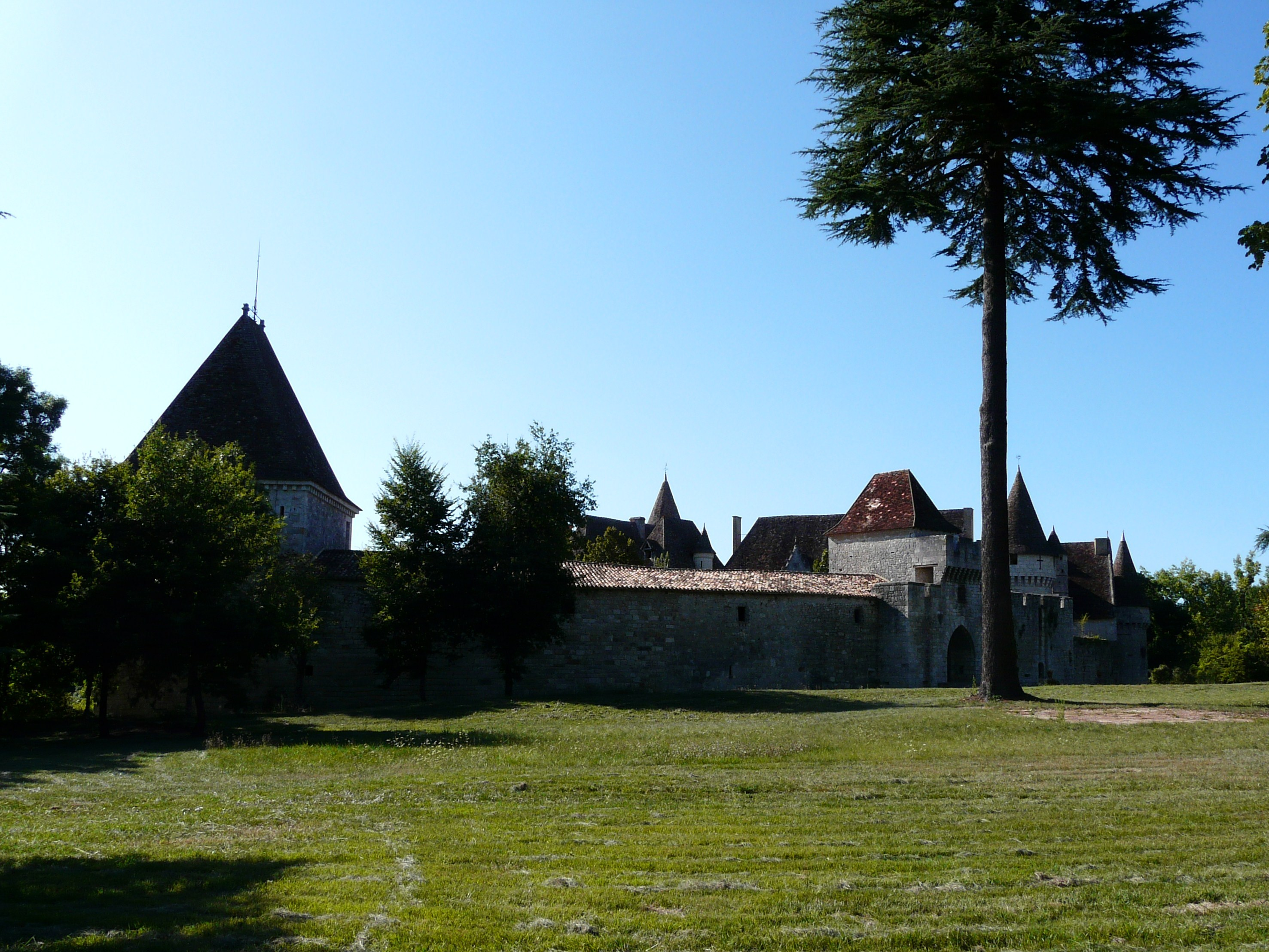

Château de Bridoire is a château in Ribagnac, Dordogne, Nouvelle-Aquitaine, France.
