= Petrocorii =

Gallic tribe

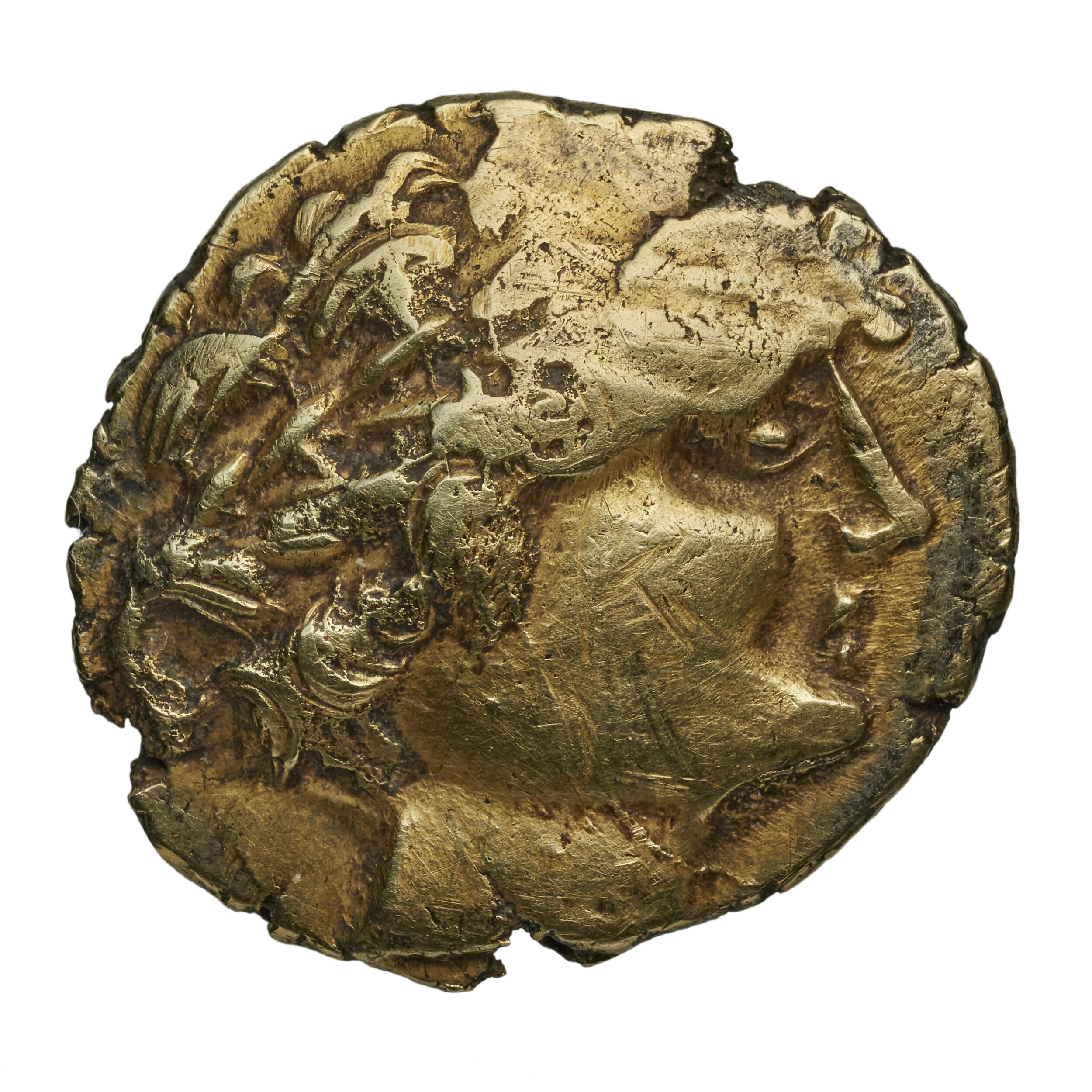
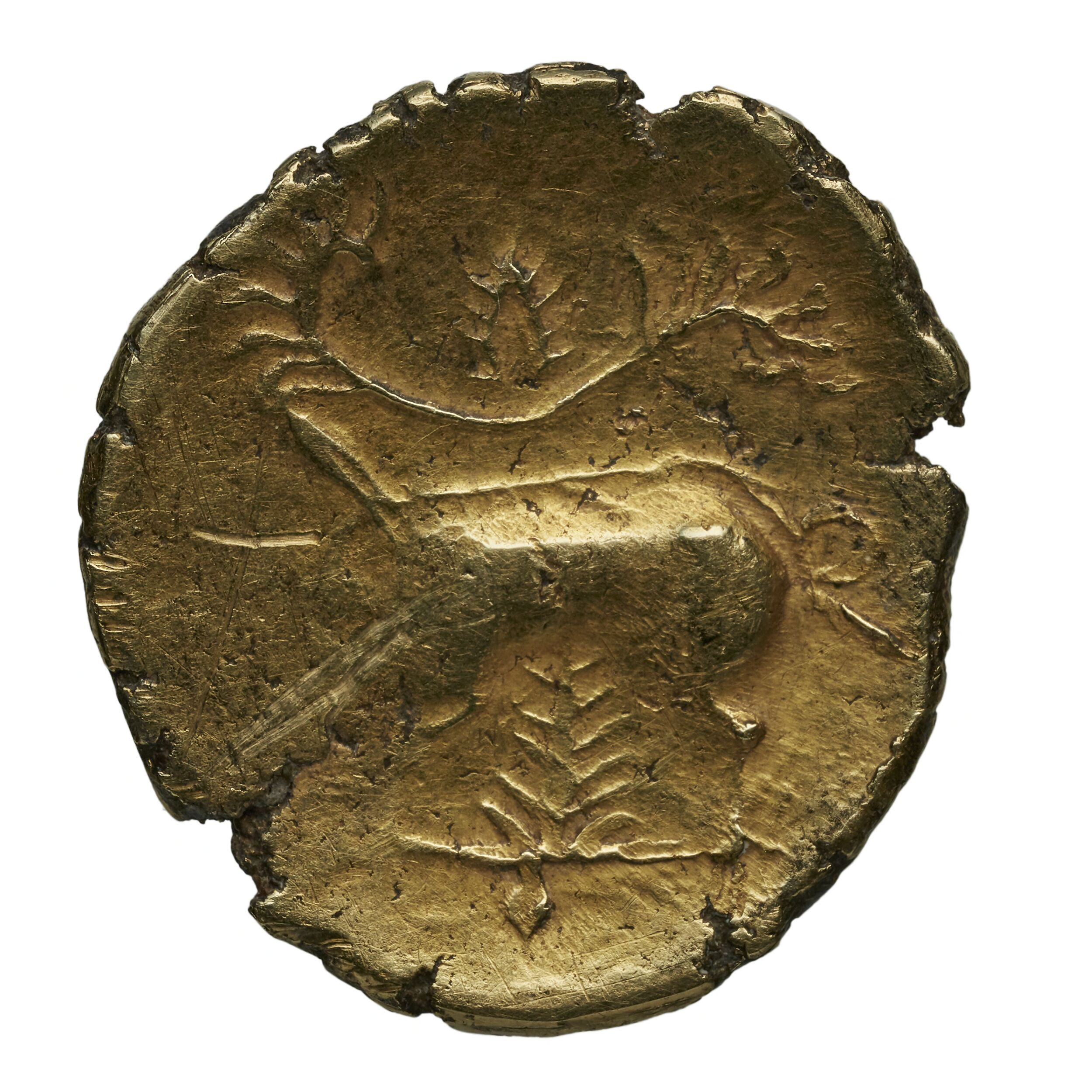
Gold stater of the Petrocorii with a youthful head on the obverse and a boar lowering his head to eat vegetation on the reverse

The Petrocorii were a Gallic tribe dwelling in the present-day Périgord region, between the Dordogne and Vézère rivers, during the Iron Age and the Roman period.

== Etymology ==
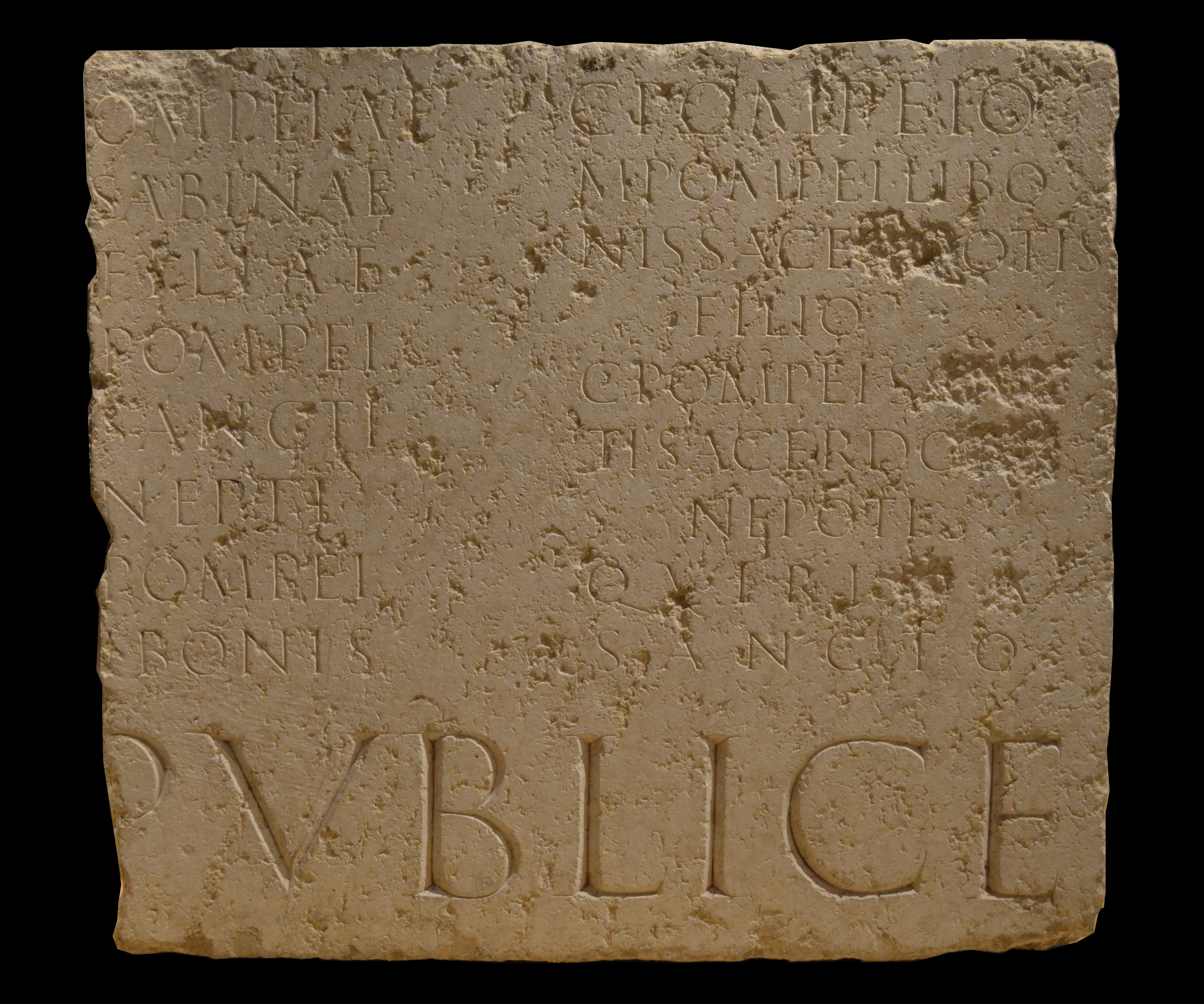
Inscribed stylobate from Lugdunum (present-day Lyon) set up by the Petrocorii (CIL XIII 1704)

They are named as Petrocorii by Caesar (mid-1st c. BC), Petrokórioi (Πετροκόριοι) by Strabo (early 1st c. AD) and Ptolemy (2nd c. AD), Petrocori by Pliny (mid-1st c. AD), and as Petrogorii by Sidonius Apollinaris (5th c. AD).

The Gaulish ethnonym Petrocorii means 'four armies', or 'four troops'. It derives from the Gaulish stem petru- ('four') attached to corios ('army'), after a Gallic custom of including numbers in tribal names (e.g. Vo-contii, Vo-corii, Tri-corii, Suess-iones). (Note: The word corios derives from Proto-Celtic *koryos ('troop, tribe'; cf. Middle Welsh cordd 'tribe, clan'; Mid. Ir. cuire), itself from Proto-Indo-European *kóryos, meaning 'army, people under arms'. The root is also found in other Gaulish tribal names such as the Tri-corii or the Corio-solites. The stem petru- stems from Proto-Celtic *kʷetwór- ('four'; cf. OIr. cetheoir, OW. and OBret. petguar).) Their name may indicate a relatively recent formation emerging from the union of fragmented small ethnic groups.

The city of Périgueux, attested ca. 400 AD as civitas Petrocoriorum ('civitas of the Petrocorii'; Petrecors in the 8th c., Periguhès in 1466), and the Périgord region, attested in the 7th c. AD as pagum Petrocorecum ('pagus of the Petrocorii'; Petragoricus in 781, Peiregore in the 12th c.), are named after the Gallic tribe.

== Geography ==
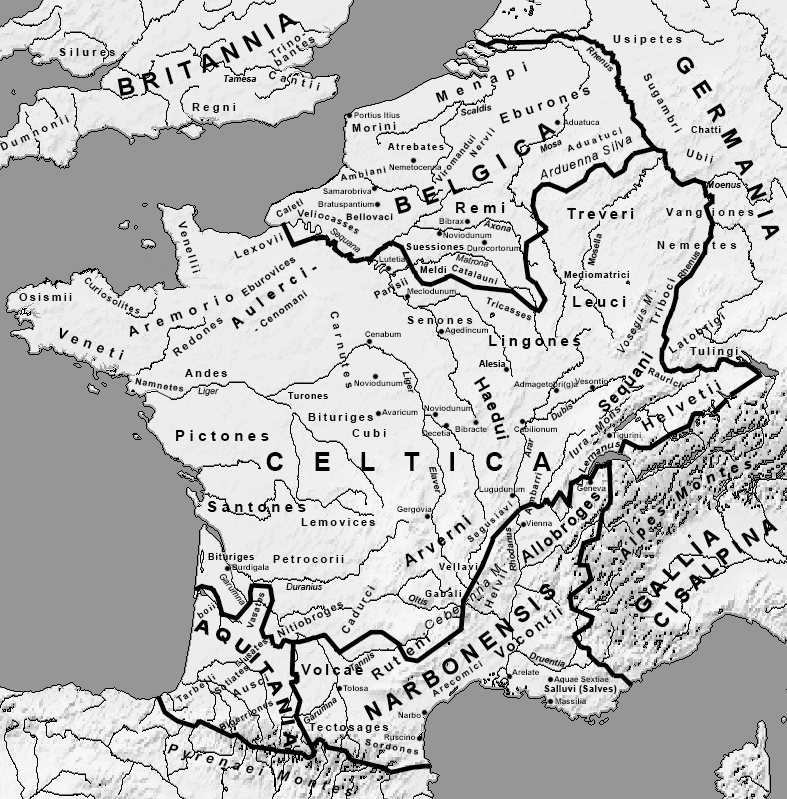
Petrocorii (circled) on a map of Gallic peoples in the 1st century BC

The Petrocorii lived in the present-day Périgord region, between the Dordogne and Vézère rivers. Their territory was located south of the Lemovices and Santones, east of the Bituriges Vivisci, west of the Arverni, and north of the Nitiobroges and Cadurci.

During the Roman period, their chief town was Vesunna, corresponding to the modern town of Périgueux.

== History ==
In 52 BC, they supplied around 5,000 warriors to Vercingetorix, to aid him to fight the Roman legions of Julius Caesar. Strabo mentions their excellence working with iron.

== See also ==
- Périgord & County of Périgord
- History of Périgueux
