= Grignols, Gironde =

Grignols
- Commune
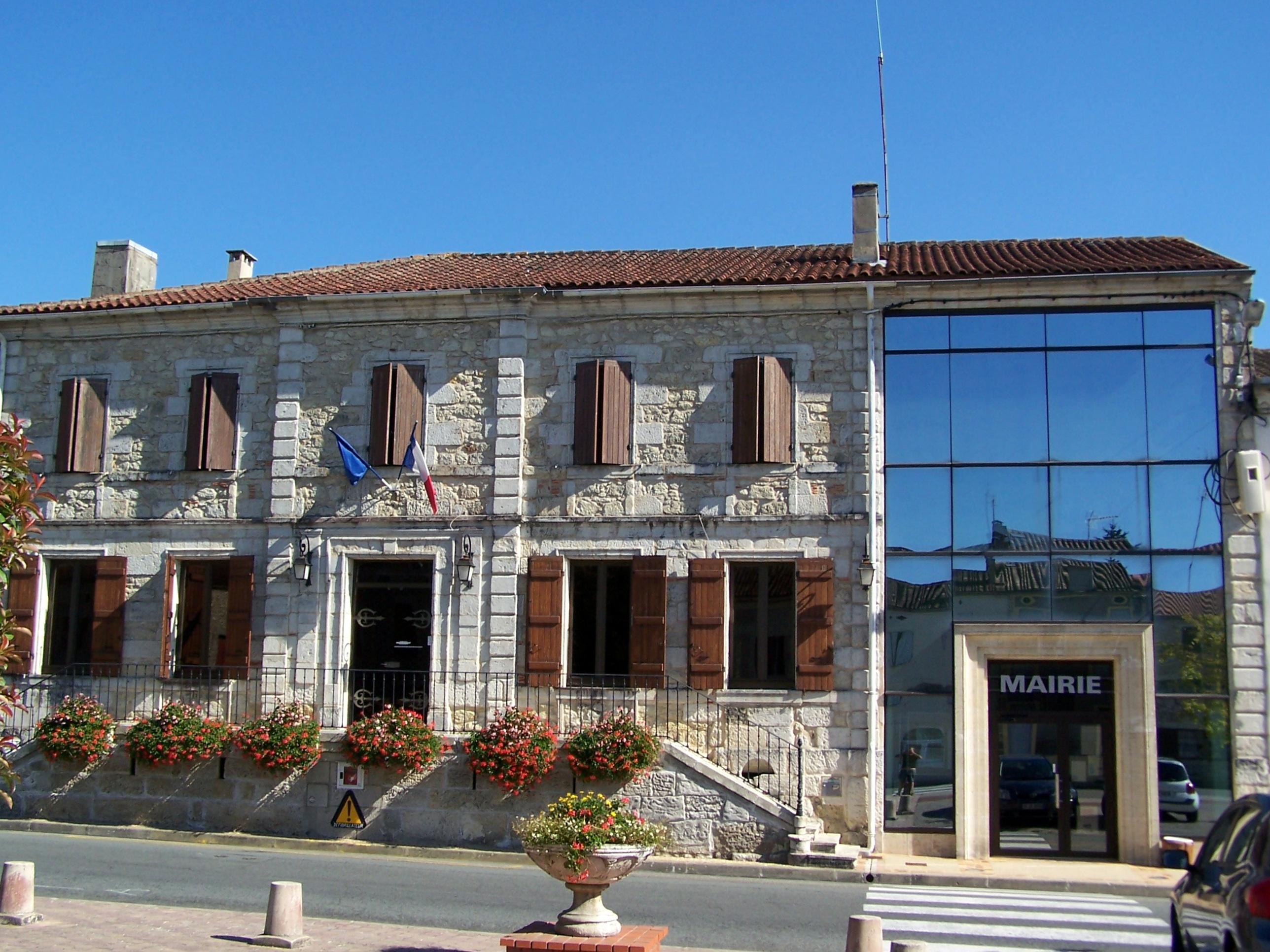
- Town hall

- Coat of arms
- Location of Grignols
- Location within France Location within Nouvelle-Aquitaine
- Coordinates: 44°23′15″N 0°02′35″W
- Country: France
- Region: Nouvelle-Aquitaine
- Department: Gironde
- Arrondissement: Langon
- Canton: Le Sud-Gironde
- Intercommunality: Bazadais

Government
  - Mayor (2020–2026): Françoise Dupiol-Tach
- Area^{1}: 22.70 km^{2} (8.76 sq mi)
- Elevation: 120 m (390 ft)
- Highest elevation: 166 m (545 ft)
- Lowest elevation: 59 m (194 ft)
- Population (2023): 1,216
  - Density: 53.57/km^{2} (138.7/sq mi)
- Time zone: UTC+01:00 (CET)
  - Summer (DST): UTC+02:00 (CEST)
- INSEE/Postal code: 33195 /33690
- ^{1} French Land Register data, which excludes lakes, ponds, glaciers > 1 km^{2} (0.386 sq mi or 247 acres) and river estuaries.

Grignols (French pronunciation: [ɡʁiɲɔls]; Occitan: Granhòs) is a commune in the Gironde department in southwestern France.

== Population ==
Historical population
Year	Pop.	±% p.a.
1968	1,266	—
1975	1,195	−0.82%
1982	1,130	−0.80%
1990	1,063	−0.76%
1999	1,058	−0.05%
2007	1,080	+0.26%
2012	1,141	+1.10%
2017	1,207	+1.13%
2023	1,216	+0.12%
Source: INSEE

== See also ==
- Communes of the Gironde department
