= Séraphin-Médéric Mieusement =

French photographer

Séraphin-Médéric Mieusement (Gonneville-la-Mallet March 12, 1840 – September 10, 1905 Pornic) was a 19th-century French architectural photographer. He worked chiefly from Blois.

He specialized in French monument historique photographic documentation, and after 1881 was assigned to photograph all the cathedrals of France for the Ministère des cultes.

== Bibliography ==
- Farid Abdelouahab (ed.) Regards objectifs: Mieusement et Lesueur, photographes à Blois. Exh. cat. Paris, Somogy, 2000, 183 p. (ISBN 2-85056-436-2)
- Gilbert Beaugé. La photographie en Provence 1839–1895. Paris: Jeanne Laffitte, 1995, 175 p. (ISBN 2862762679, OCLC 231860912)
