= Vesunna =

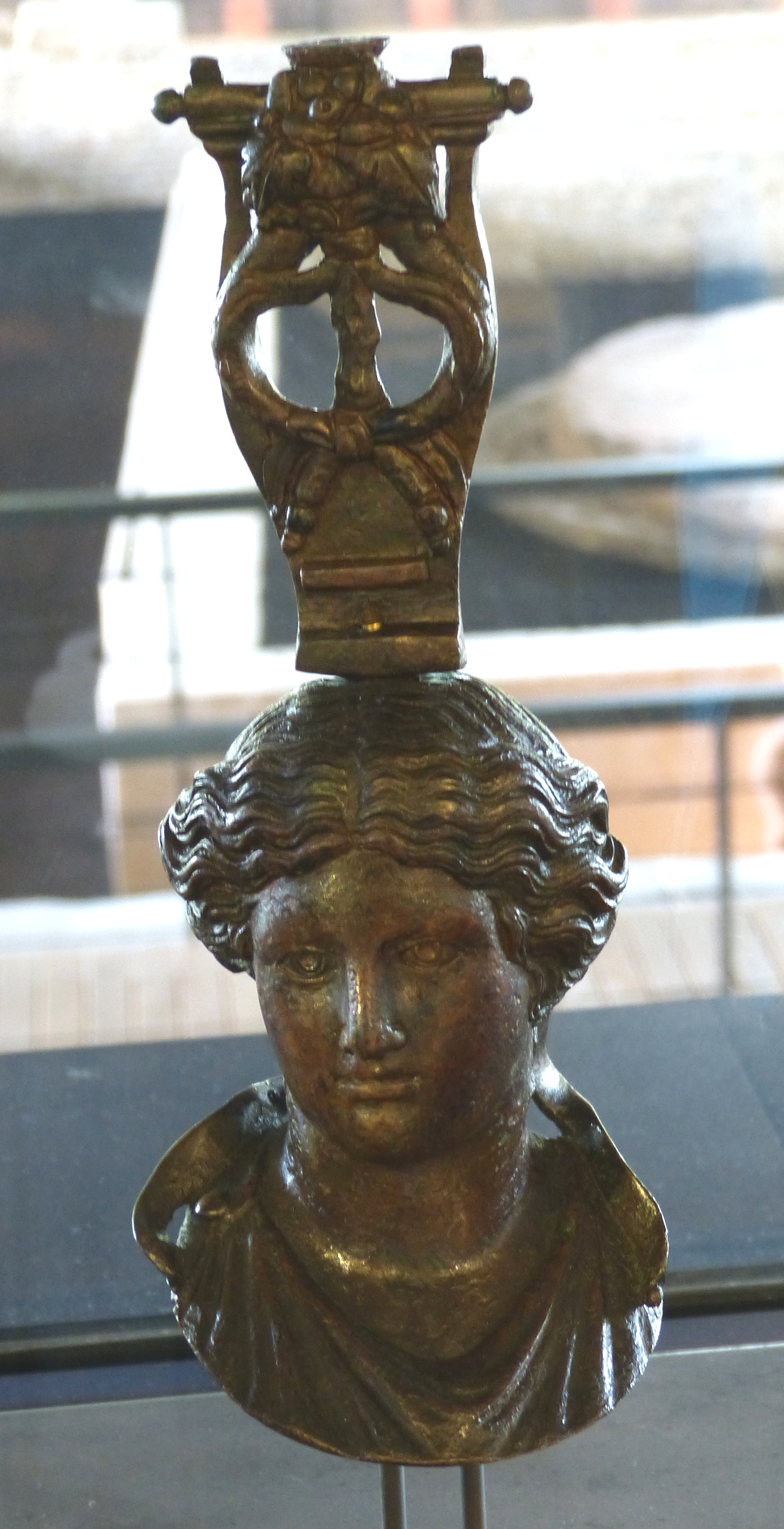
Bronze statuette of Vesunna with elements of syncretism: sistrum on the head of the goddess Isis - Périgueux Museum

Vesunna is a Celtic goddess worshipped in Roman Gaul. She was likely considered a giver of prosperity, abundance and good fortune, as evidenced by the cornucopia she is depicted carrying in her images.

Vesunna was also once the name of a town just south of the modern French city of Périgueux, where the goddess had a temple in ancient times; she was certainly the patron goddess of this city and its people and thus a protector.

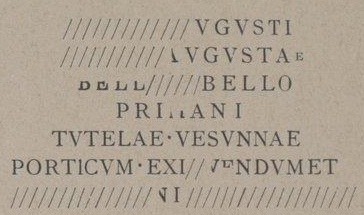
Inscription with the name of goddess Vesunna

In inscriptions found in Périgueux, Vesunna is identified with the Roman guardian goddess Tutela. Vesunna received votive and dedicatory offerings from her worshippers; otherwise little is known of the specifics of her cult. She had a temple in the city that bore her name. Vesunna was worshipped especially by the Gaulish Celtic tribe known as the Petrocorii, whose name survives in that of the modern French city of Périgueux, located just north of her great temple.

== Etymology ==
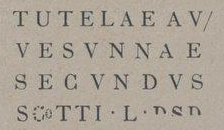
Inscription with the name of goddess Vesunna and dedicator Secundus

Vesunna's name is likely to derive from the Proto-Celtic *wesu, meaning ‘good’, 'worthy'.

Alternatively, related to the name of the Greek goddess Hestia, whose name means "hearth, fireplace, altar", This stems from the PIE root *wes, "burn" (ult. from *h₂wes- "dwell, pass the night, stay"). And so likely also related to the name of the Latin goddess of the hearth, Vesta, though this connection is questioned by Beekes.

Probably related to Umbrian Vesune which should be a dative singular of a *Vesuna, presumed to be a name of a goddess. Perhaps also related to the name of Mount Vesuvius.

== Similar theonymes ==
There is one inscription from Baden-Baden with the invocation of goddess Visuna, probably an inscriptive variant of goddess Vesunna from Périgueux. On the altar stone are clearly visible the objects for libation. CIL 13, 11714 = Wagner-01, p 20 = AE 1907, 00110 dating: 101 to 250 EDCS-ID: EDCS-12600015 province: Germania superior place: Baden-Baden / Aquae Visunae / L(ucius) Salvius / Similis S(alvi) / Similis / fil(ius) Medi/omat(ricus) / v(otum) s(olvit) l(ibens) m(erito)

== Bibliography ==
- Beekes, Robert (2010). Etymological Dictionary of Greek. Leiden-Boston: Brill. ISBN 978-900417418-4.
