= Sabourin =

Sabourin is a French-Canadian surname most commonly found in Quebec. Notable people with the surname include:

- Bob Sabourin (1933–2020), Canadian ice hockey player, coach, and manager
- Charles Sabourin (1849–1920), French pathologist
- Dany Sabourin (born 1980), Canadian ice hockey player
- Emilio Sabourín (1854–1897), Cuban baseball player and manager
- Gabriel Sabourin, Canadian actor and screenwriter
- Gary Sabourin (born 1943), Canadian ice hockey player
- Joëlle Sabourin (born 1972), Canadian curler
- Ken Sabourin (born 1966), Canadian ice hockey player
- Lucien Sabourin (1904–1987), French botanist
- Marcel Sabourin (born 1935), Canadian actor and writer
- Oscar Sabourin (1897–1937), Canadian ice hockey player
- Roméo Sabourin (1923–1944), Canadian World War II Lieutenant
- Scott Sabourin (born 1992), Canadian ice hockey player

== See also ==
- Cathy Bursey-Sabourin (born 1957), Canadian artist
