= Coderc Plaza =

Plaza in Périgueux, France

Coderc Plaza Place du Coderc
- Town Square
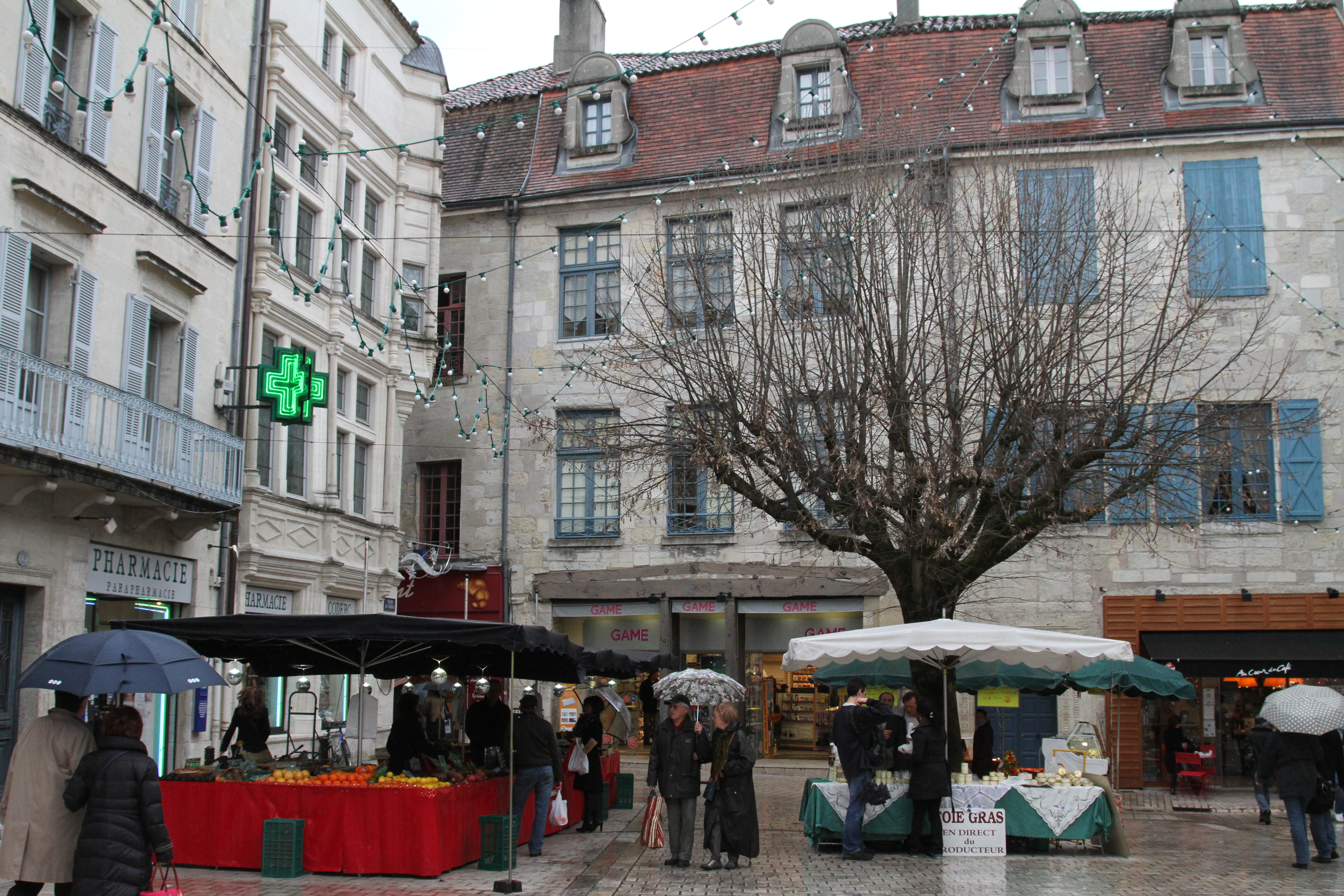
- Northeast corner of Place du Coderc in 2009.

- Location within France
- Coordinates: 45°11′03″N 0°43′17″E
- Country: France
- Region: Nouvelle-Aquitaine
- City: Périgueux
- District: La Gare / Saint-Martin

Area
  - Total: 0.001927 km^{2} (0.000744 sq mi)

Dimensions
  - Length: 0.00007 km (4.3×10^{−5} mi)
  - Width: 0.000046 km (2.9×10^{−5} mi)

Coderc Plaza is a town square in Périgueux, in the Dordogne department, France.

The square's history dates back to the Middle Ages. Since then, it has been home to the city's most important buildings, including the Maison de la Commune from the Ancien Régime onwards. When the first market hall was built around 1400, Coderc Plaza became an important location for the traditional market.

Over the following centuries, a succession of mainly wealthy families settled on and around the square, leaving behind traces of their heritage. After the French Revolution, the Coderc was the main executioner's square for around half a century. Later, commerce developed, and by the 1970s, there were around thirty stores in the area.

== Location ==
Coderc Plaza is located in the preserved area of downtown Périgueux, in the immediate vicinity of the old town hall.

== History ==
The word coderc (or couderc) comes from the Gallic word coderc or coterico, meaning a common space. In Old Occitan, codèrc means "communal enclosure, courtyard, square, lawn or pasture".

=== Middle age ===
Coderc Plaza dates back to the Middle Ages when it was much smaller than the present-day square, and was home to the most important buildings in the town of Puy-Saint-Front.

=== Modern times ===
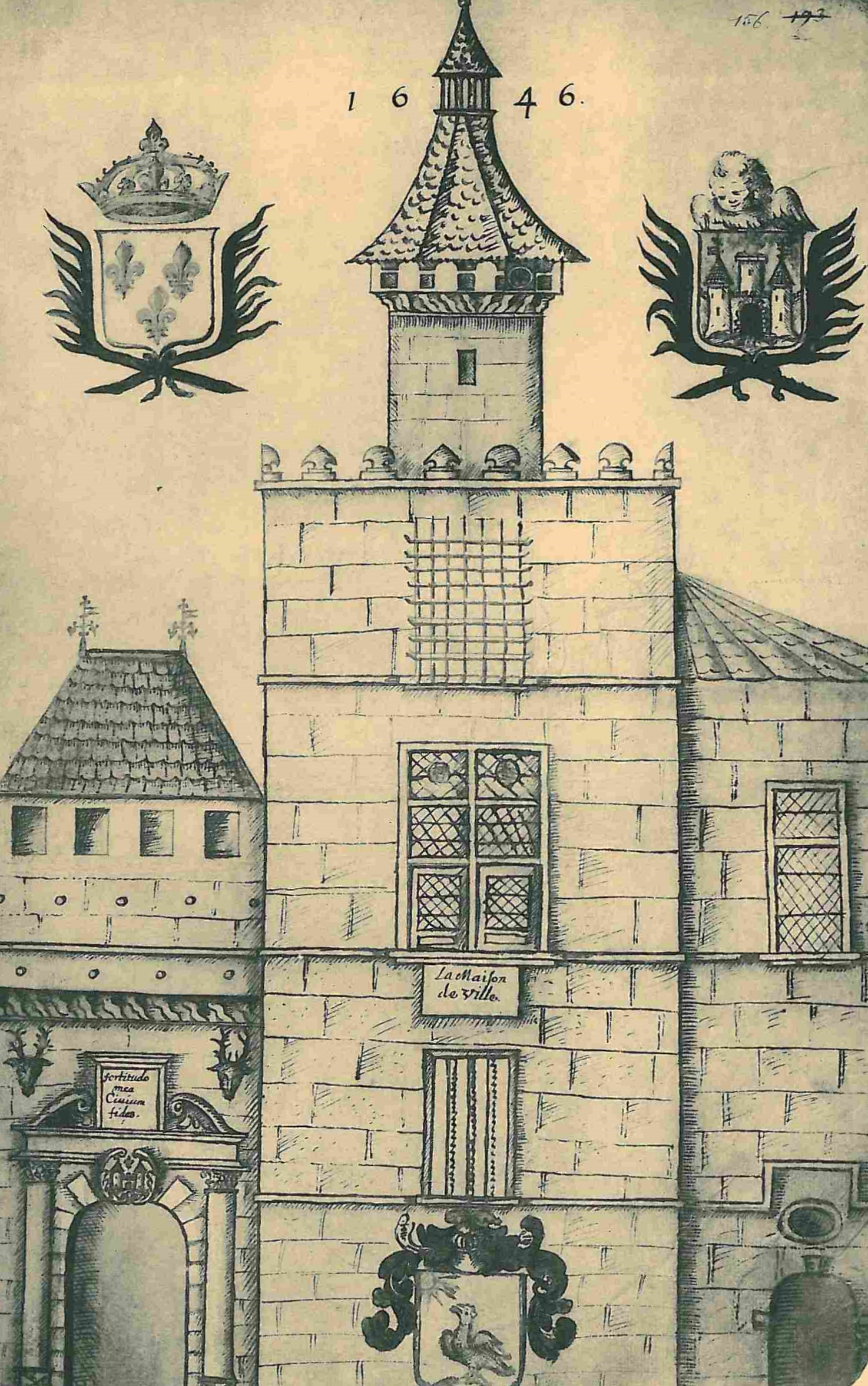
The consulate, also known as the "Maison de ville de Périgueux" (circa 1646), was located on the Coderc Plaza.

During the Ancien Régime, the town hall was built on this square. The consulate is mentioned in the 1240 Treaty of Union between Puy-Saint-Front and the Cité. Located on the boundary between the parishes of Saint-Silain and Saint-Front, the consulate also served as a prison. Comprising a three-story building, it was towered over by a six-story belfry with a machicolated allure, topped by a lantern and weather vane. A clock is mentioned on the building dating back to 1390.

In the 14th century, following the tradition of the Périgueux carnival, banquets paid for by the consulate were organized on the Place du Coderc, in the presence of the town's three main religious communities (Order of Saint Clare, Order of Friars Minor, and the Dominican Order). The main dishes served are salt pork, of Limoges origin, and beef, in Bœuf Gras tradition. The distribution of these meals in the context of constant famine often led to outbursts and violent jostling.

Around 1400, the first marketplace was built on the square.

From 1400 to 1448, a well was dug in the middle of the square; partly filled in, it was drained in 1490–1491. Then, in 1528, the square was paved.

The marketplace was covered over in 1557, then expanded in 1570, before being destroyed on 29 March 1650, to dislodge the Picardy regiment occupying it.

In the 17th century, the Coderc Plaza was the center of the district, where wealthy families built their homes.

As a result of dissatisfaction with wine taxes, a riot broke out in 1635: Jean Seguin, the mayor's secretary, was massacred and his corpse thrown into the well. The well was sealed in 1679, but not adequately enough, and in 1839 the town council voted to subscribe for its permanent filling.

In 1739, a new clock with a jacquemart (bellstriker) made of two wooden figures was installed at the top of the consulate belfry.

=== French revolution and the Empire ===
In 1793, a liberty tree was planted in the middle of the Coderc Plaza. Originally the site of the pillory, between 1800 and 1840 the square became the public space for the guillotine and numerous executions.

The consulate was demolished in 1829, to be replaced by a new marketplace, and the remains of the building collapsed during a powerful storm on 23 May 1830. During excavations of the consulate cellars on 26 August of the same year, a culverin dated 1588 was discovered. (Note: The culverin has been deposited in the Museum of Art and Archeology of Périgord.)

Part of Prefect Charles de Chastenet's major urban planning project for Périgueux, the new covered marketplace was built in 1832–1833 on the site of the former consulate by architect Louis Catoire. Opened to the public on 15 December 1833, it was used until 1875 for the grain market, and later for open outcry sales.

=== From the early 20th century to the present day ===
On 25 March 1908, priest Noé Chabot opened a bar-tabac on the square, which regularly welcomed railway workers from the Compagnie du Paris-Orléans.

In 1953, a project was launched to replace the marketplace with a new round marketplace on the same site, with triple the capacity.

Number of shops by sector in Rue des Chaînes (Note: Rue des Chaînes, which begins at Cours Montaigne, opens onto Coderc Plaza at its northwest corner.) and Coderc Plaza (1970s)
Food	Personal equipment	Home equipment	Hygiene and health	Culture and leisure
10	8	2	1	7

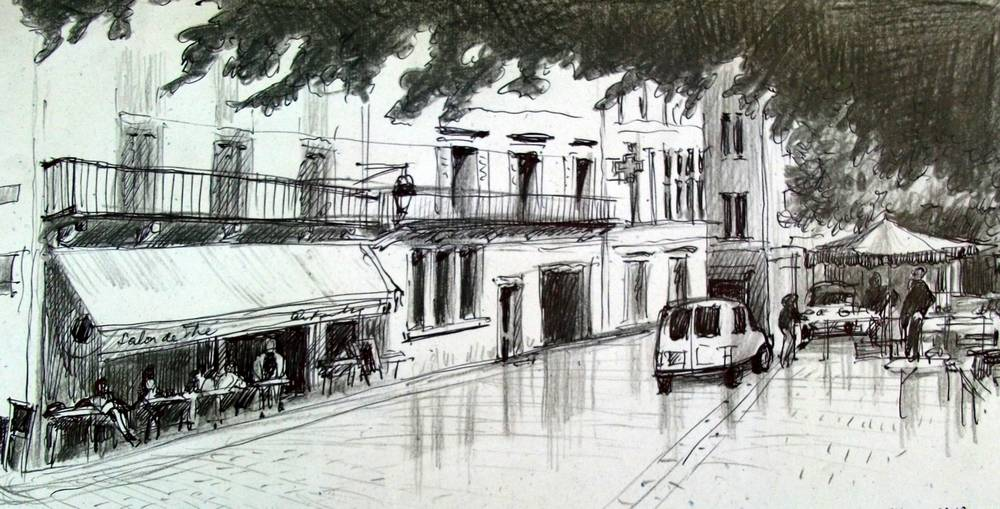
Sketch of the Coderc Plaza by Guy Moll.

In September 1979, during works on the Coderc Plaza, two cannons were discovered in the former consulate cellars; they are now on display in the Thouin garden.

The market hall was restored in 1999.

On 17 July 2013, a plaque in honor of Jean Boussuges (1938–2013), the famous "poet of the Coderc", was officially inaugurated at the corner with rue de la Sagesse.

In early October 2014, the cobblestones of the square were rejointed by municipal workers.

In early 2015, the town decided to limit parking on the square, from May to September, to people with reduced mobility and delivery vehicles.

== Economy ==
According to the newspaper Sud Ouest, Coderc is the place for the "traditional market" in Périgord on Wednesdays and Saturdays. In addition, the marketplace is open every morning. Au 9 bis, a former post office, closed on 30 November 2016, and was replaced on 15 April 2017, by the new premises of the municipal tourist office.

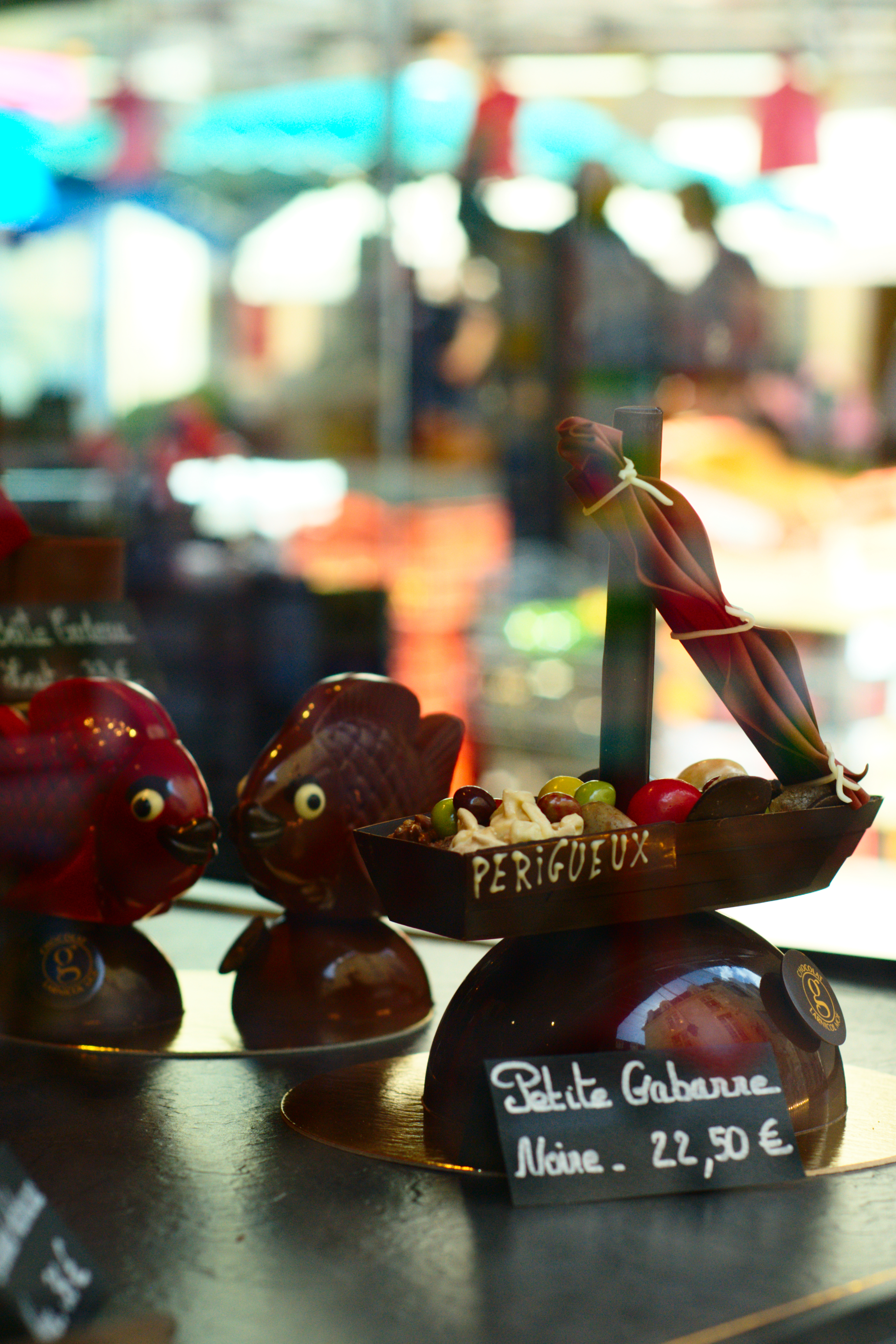
Chocolates sold on the square.

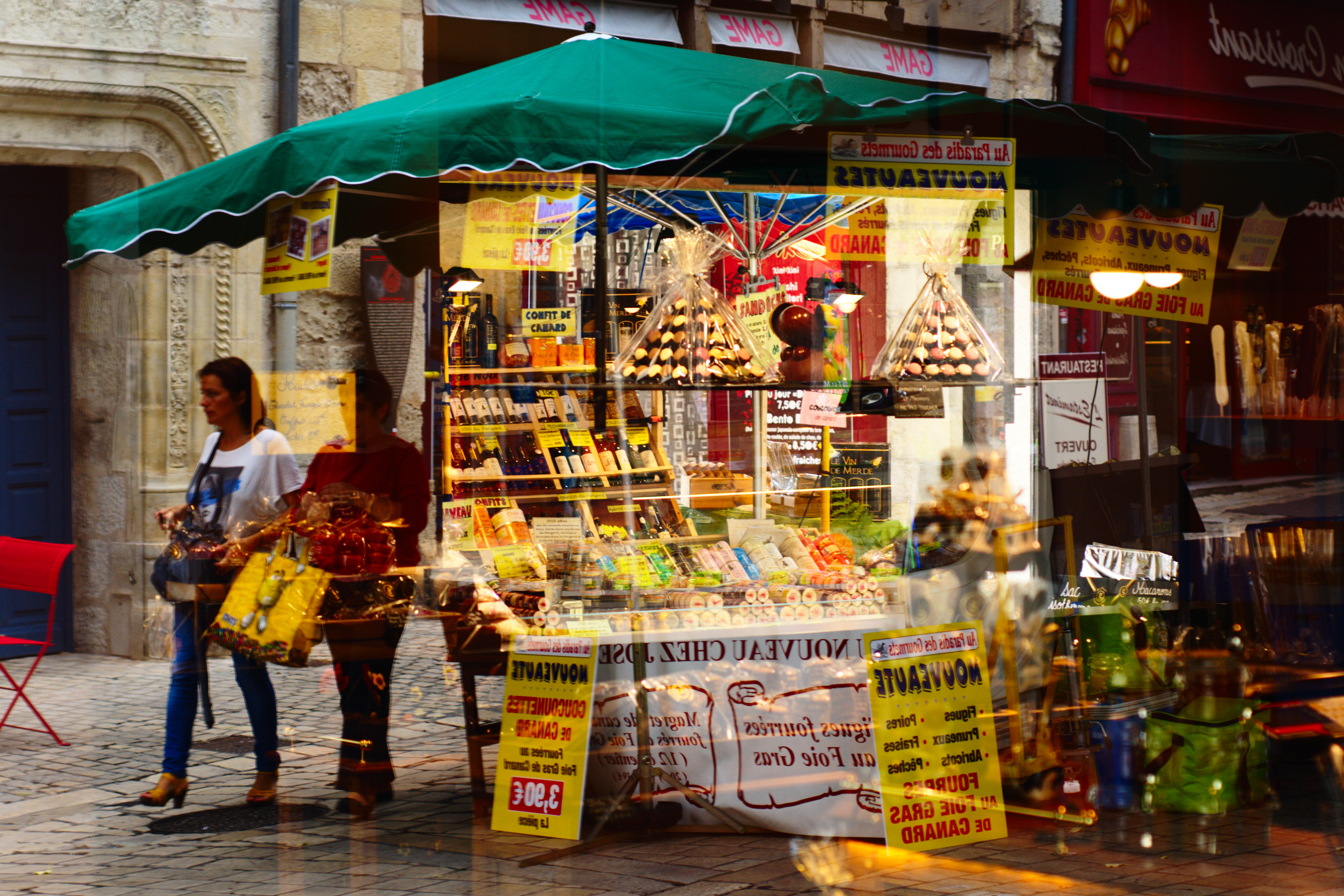
Specialities sold on the square.

== Architecture ==
Schematic plan of the square.

With its irregular polygonal shape, the square's layout corresponds to two adjoining trapezoids, a small one to the east and a large one to the west. With a surface area of 1,927 m^{2} and an average width of 34 m, the square is 66 to 70 m long and 20 to 46 m wide. (Note: Data calculated from Géoportail.)

The main architectural feature is the Coderc hall, built in 1832–1833, a rectangular building that occupies the entire western side of the square.

To the north, at no. 11, is the Hôtel de Lestrade, whose entrance is at 1 rue de la Sagesse. While the exterior reveals no particular architectural detail, its interior Renaissance staircase with coffered ceilings was listed as a historic monument in 1928 and classified in 2005, while the entire building was listed in 2003.

In the northeast corner, at 17 place du Coderc, the "maison Lapeyre" (named after the pharmacist who occupied it from the late 18th and early 19th centuries) or the "maison Pouyaud" (named after his successor), stands at the corner of 1 rue Limogeanne, the main pedestrian crossing in Périgueux's historic center. The corbelled polygonal corner turret dates back to the 17th century. The building was partly destroyed by fire in 1719 and subsequently restored.

To the east of the square, No. 10 features 13th-century columns and capitals.

The north facade of the former town hall (Note: This town hall provided the main municipal services from 1823 to 2013.) faces the south-west corner of the square. Adjacent to the former town hall, no. 2 lies remains of three 11th or 13th-century windows.

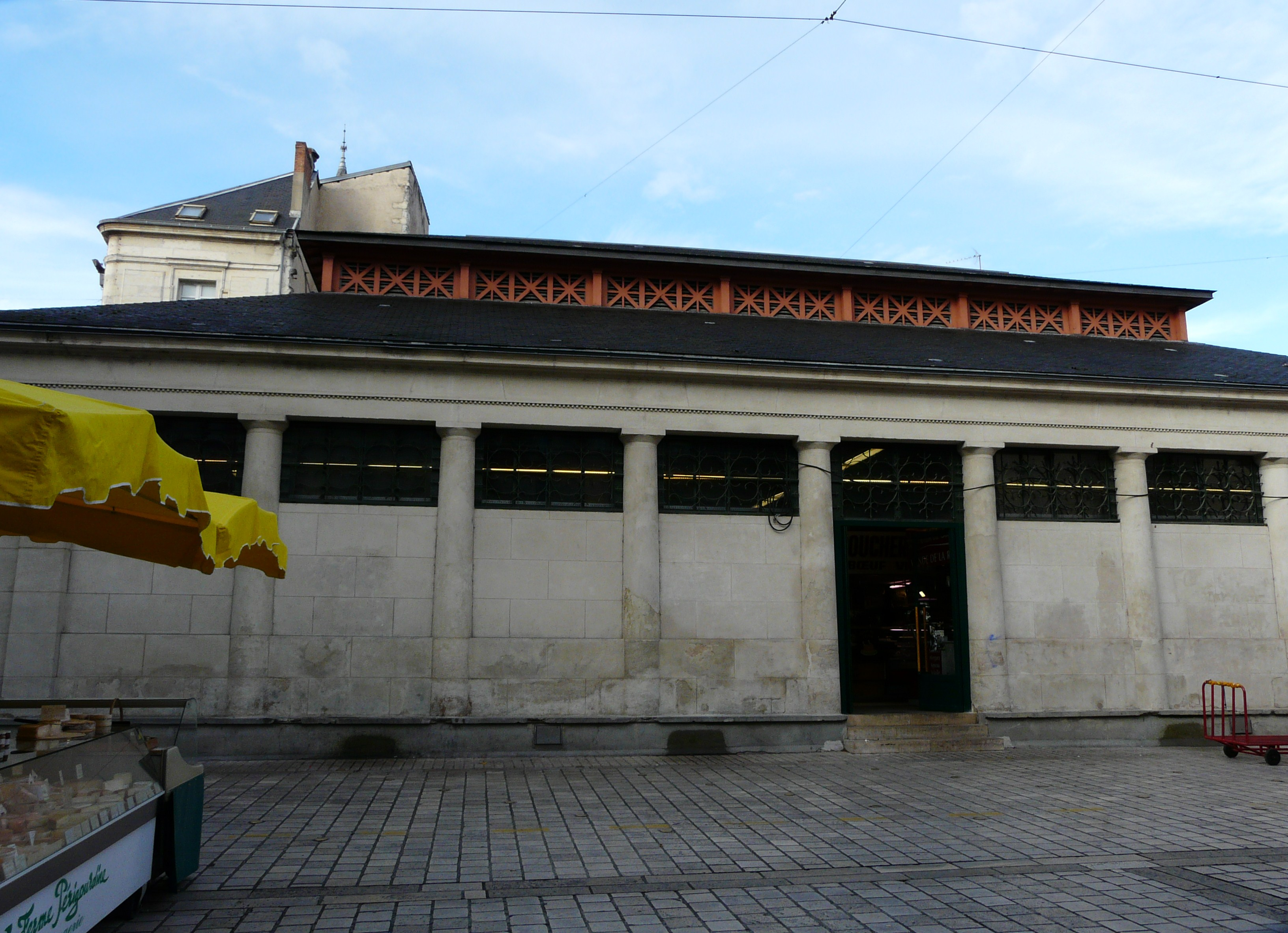
The market hall.

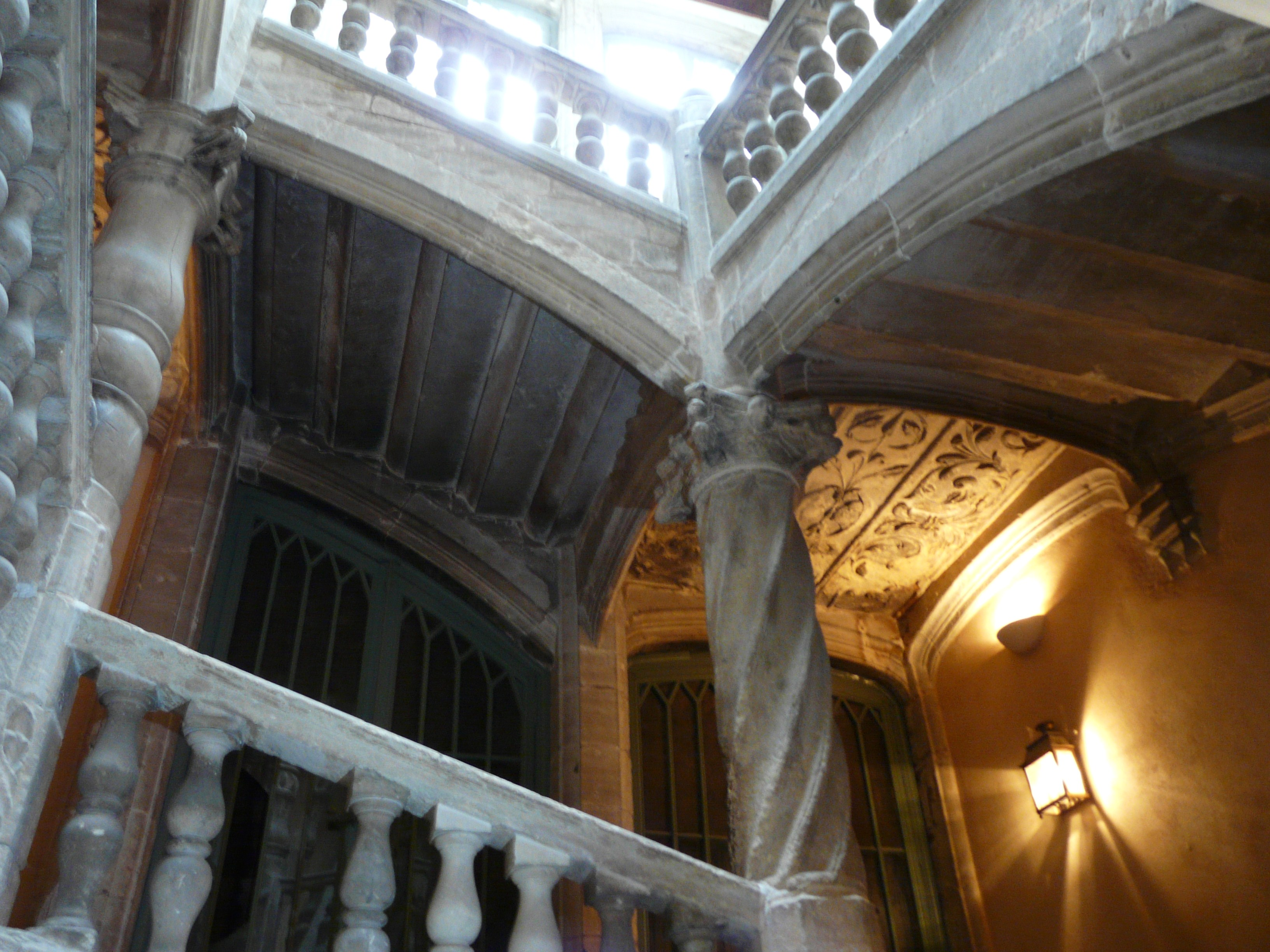
The Renaissance staircase of the Hôtel de Lestrade.

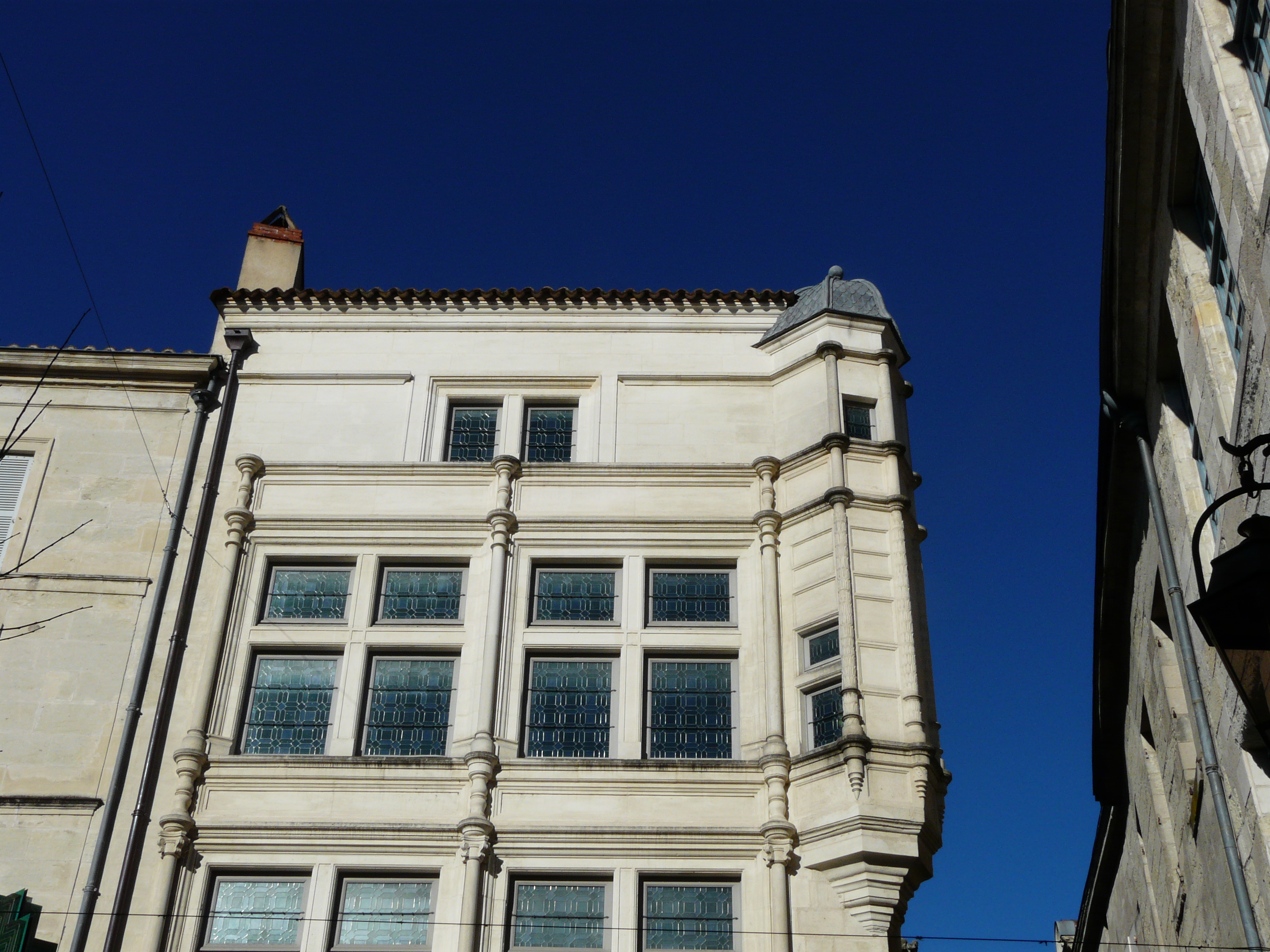
Maison Lapeyre: façade facing Coderc Plaza.

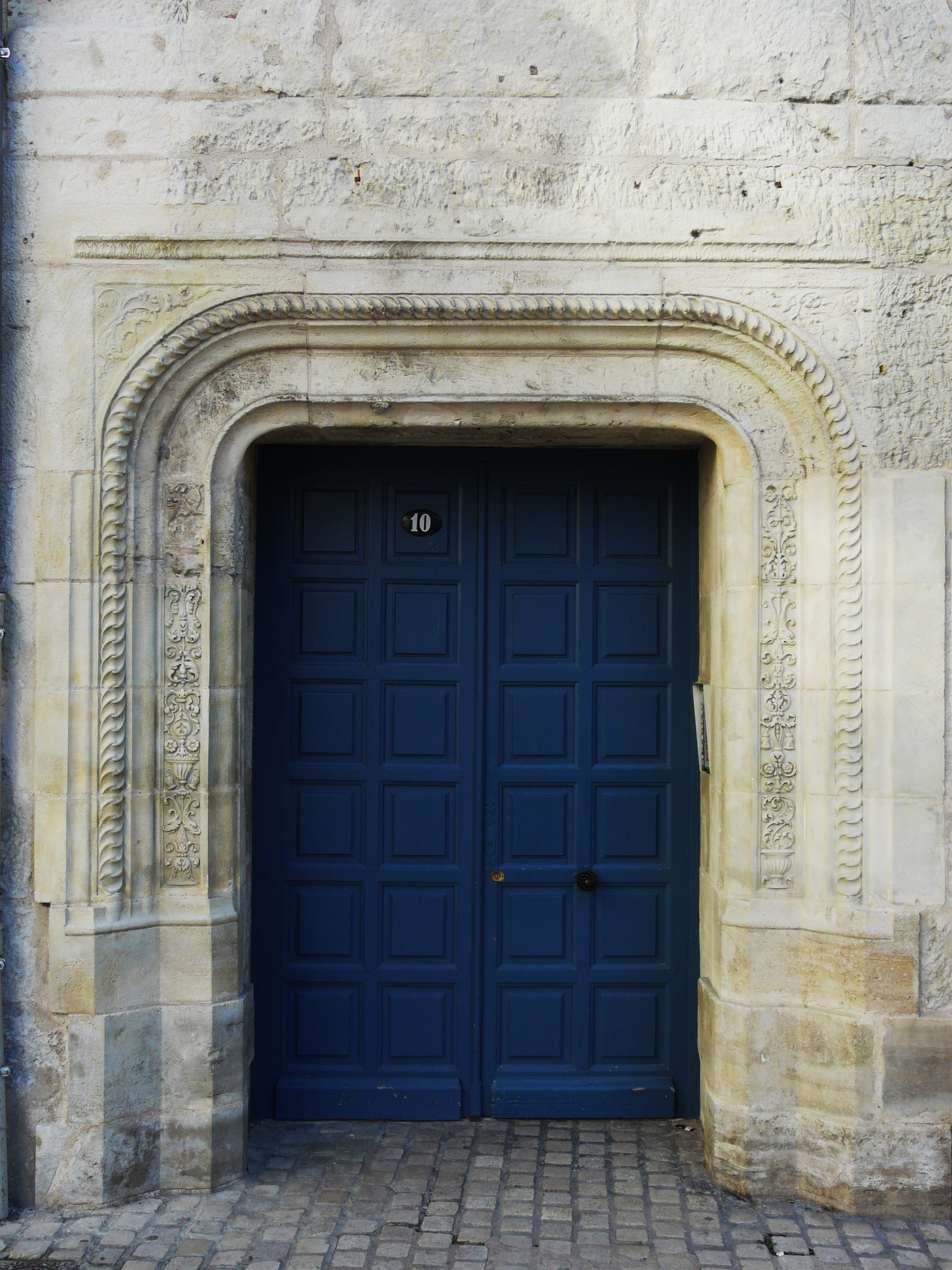
The door to no. 10.

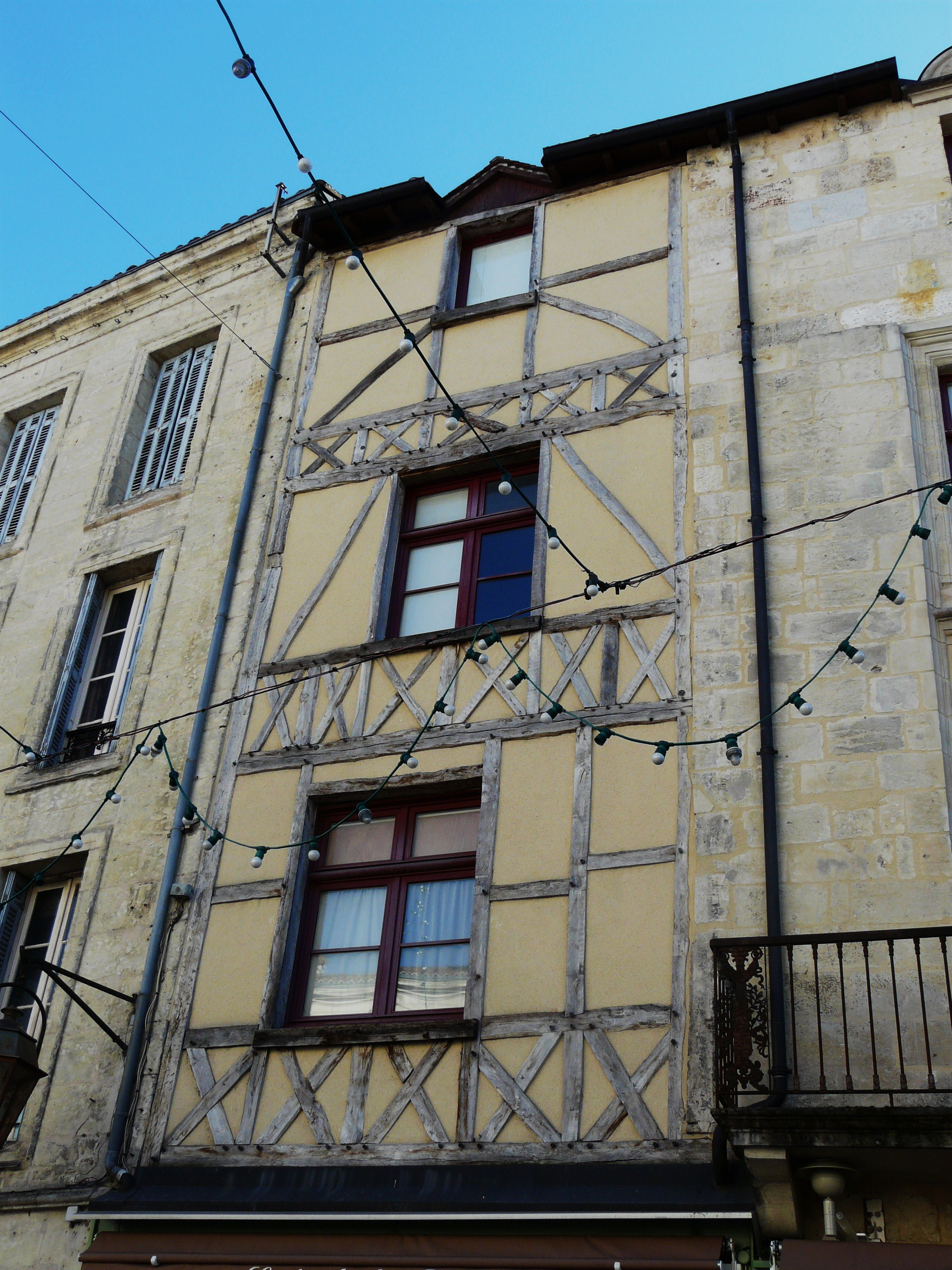
Half-timbered house at no. 4.

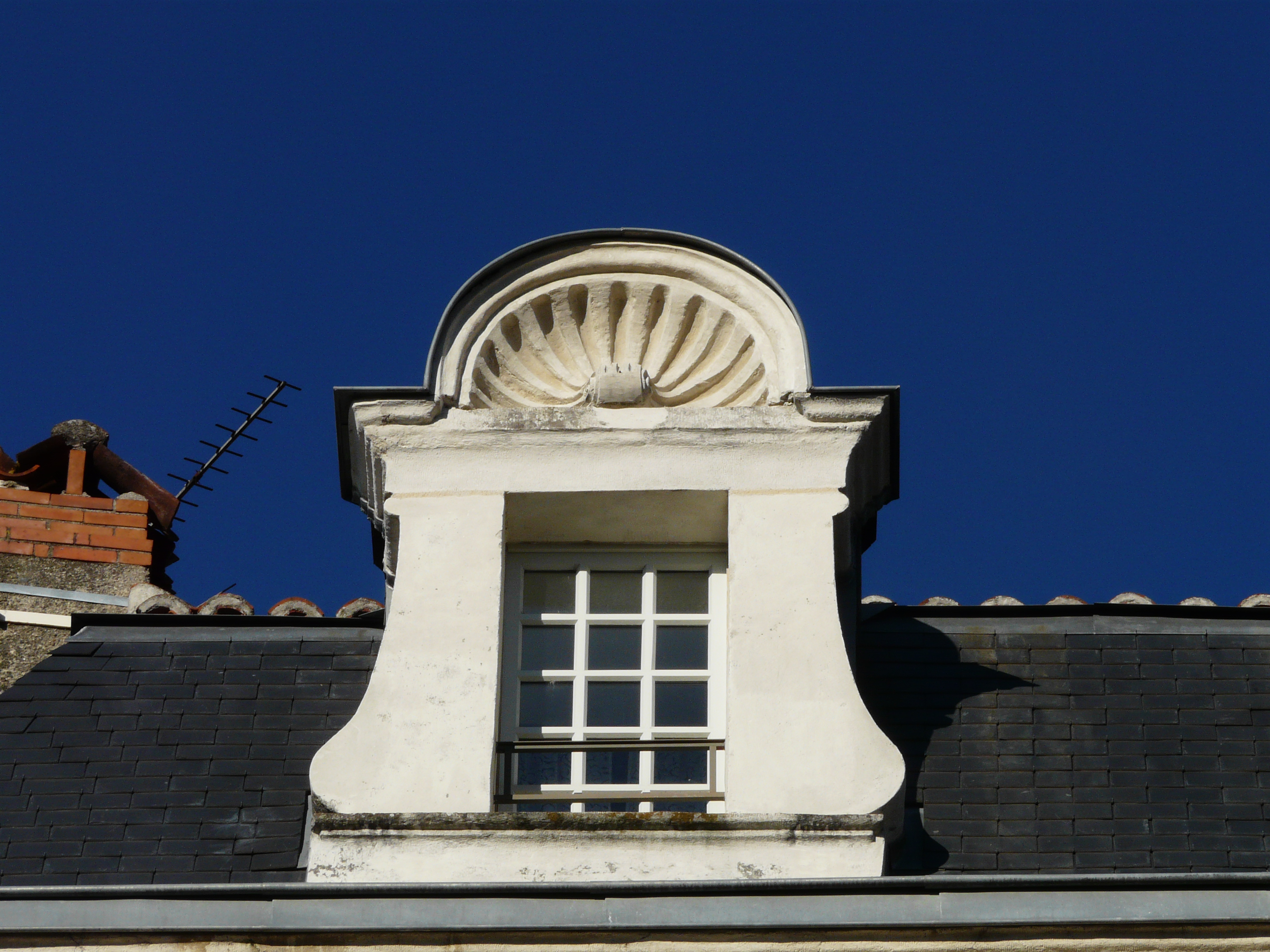
Dormer window at no. 13.

== Coderc Plaza in culture ==
The square is mentioned at the start of chapter III of Jacquou le Croquant, the social novel written by Eugène Le Roy: "The next day at the appointed hour, we were in front of the building of the former Présidial, which was still called by that name and which was on the Coderc Plaza, just opposite the prisons, where number 8 is today".

Jean Boussuges (1938–2013), locally nicknamed the "poet of the Coderc", wrote a collection of poems, most of which relate to encounters and observations he made on this square.

== Appendix ==
=== Bibliography ===
- Henry-François-Athanase Wlgrin de Taillefer, Antiquités de Vésone, cité gauloise, remplacée par la ville actuelle de Périgueux, t. 2, éditions Dupont, 1825, 719 p. (read online archive)
- Guy Penaud, Le Grand Livre de Périgueux, Périgueux, éditions la Lauze, March 2003, 601 p. (ISBN 978-2-912032-50-8)
- Michel Genty, Villes et bourgs du Périgord et du pays de Brive: le fait urbain dans des espaces de la France des faibles densités, vol. 1, Presses universitaires de Bordeaux, 1984, 1173 p. (ISBN 978-2-86781-008-4, read online archive), pp. 839, 849.
- Maurice Melliet (pref. Yves Guéna and Xavier Darcos), Jean Boussuges: Le poète du Coderc, Périgueux, Arka, November 2006, 82 p. (ISBN 978-2-9529067-5-3)
- Christian Magne (pref. Alain Bernard), Le Carnaval en Périgord, vol. 1: La fête en Périgord, Le Bugue, PLB Éditions, coll. "Collection Centaurée", 1992, 111 p. (ISBN 978-2-86952-039-4, 2-86952-039-5, ISSN 0989-6422)

=== Related articles ===
- Périgueux
- Carnaval de Périgueux
- Boeuf Gras
