= Bœuf Gras =

French traditional holiday figure

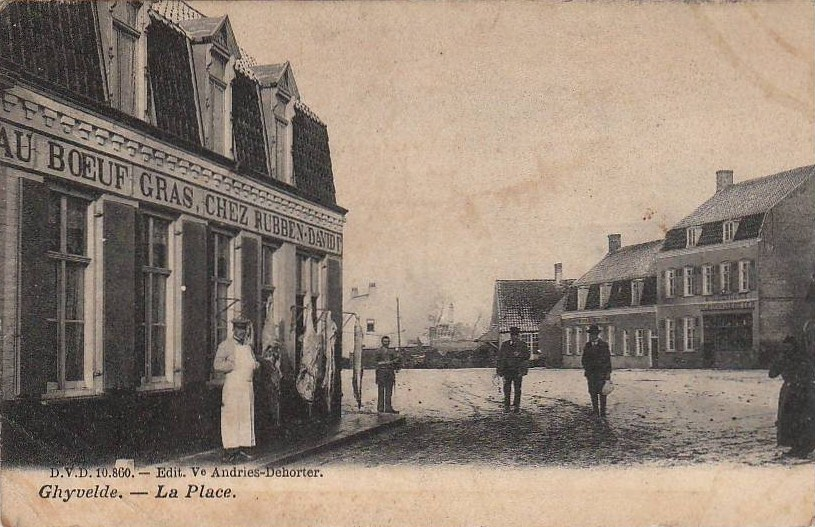
La Butcherie au Bœuf Gras in Ghyvelde.

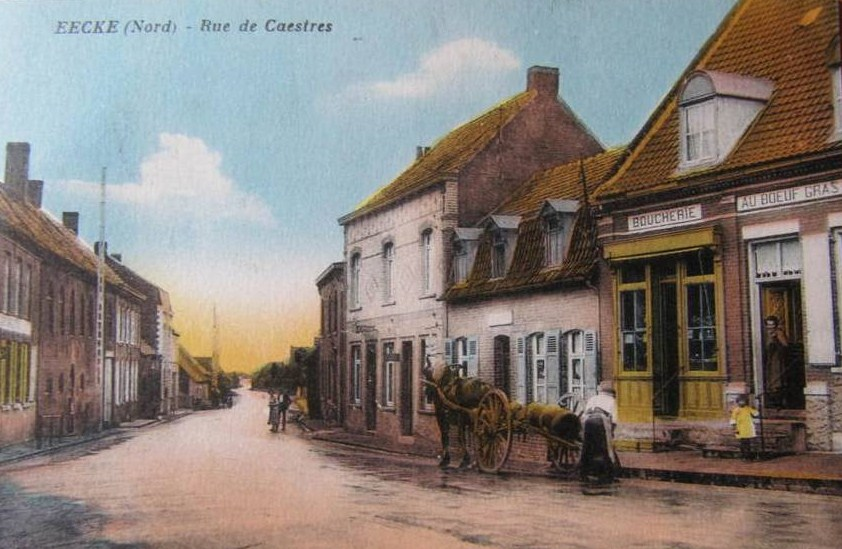
La Butcherie au Bœuf Gras in Eecke.

The Bœuf Gras ("Fat Ox") is a traditional festive figure displayed or paraded by butchers, usually during Carnival celebrations. It may take the form of a live ox or other placid bovine, or a sculpted representation of one. (Note: The term "butcher's boy" is no longer commonly used today, having largely been replaced by "butcher's apprentice".)

This article provides a non-exhaustive overview of Bœuf Gras festivities in various countries.

== England ==
An English cartoon from 1660 depicts Mardi Gras mounted on a fat ox and preparing to do battle with Lent.

== Belgium ==
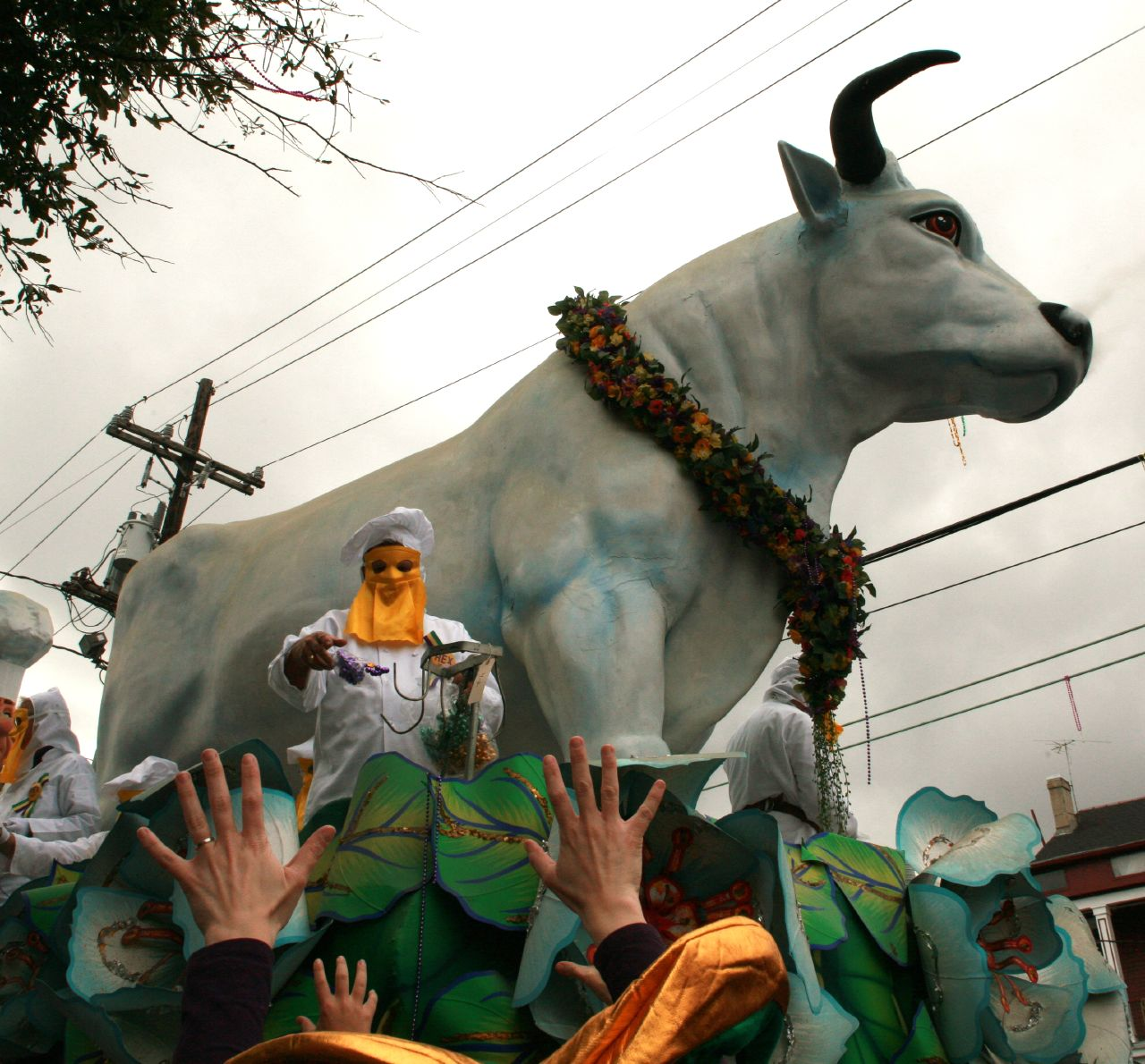
The Bœuf Gras float at the New Orleans Carnival.

=== Anderlecht ===
The Bœuf Gras competition was held in Anderlecht from 1909 to 1998.

=== Antwerp ===
A Boeuf Gras procession took place in Antwerp on Monday March 28, 1910, the day after Easter Sunday.

=== Mouscron ===
There is a Bœuf Gras competition in Mouscron, which had its 40th edition in 2023.

== Canada ==
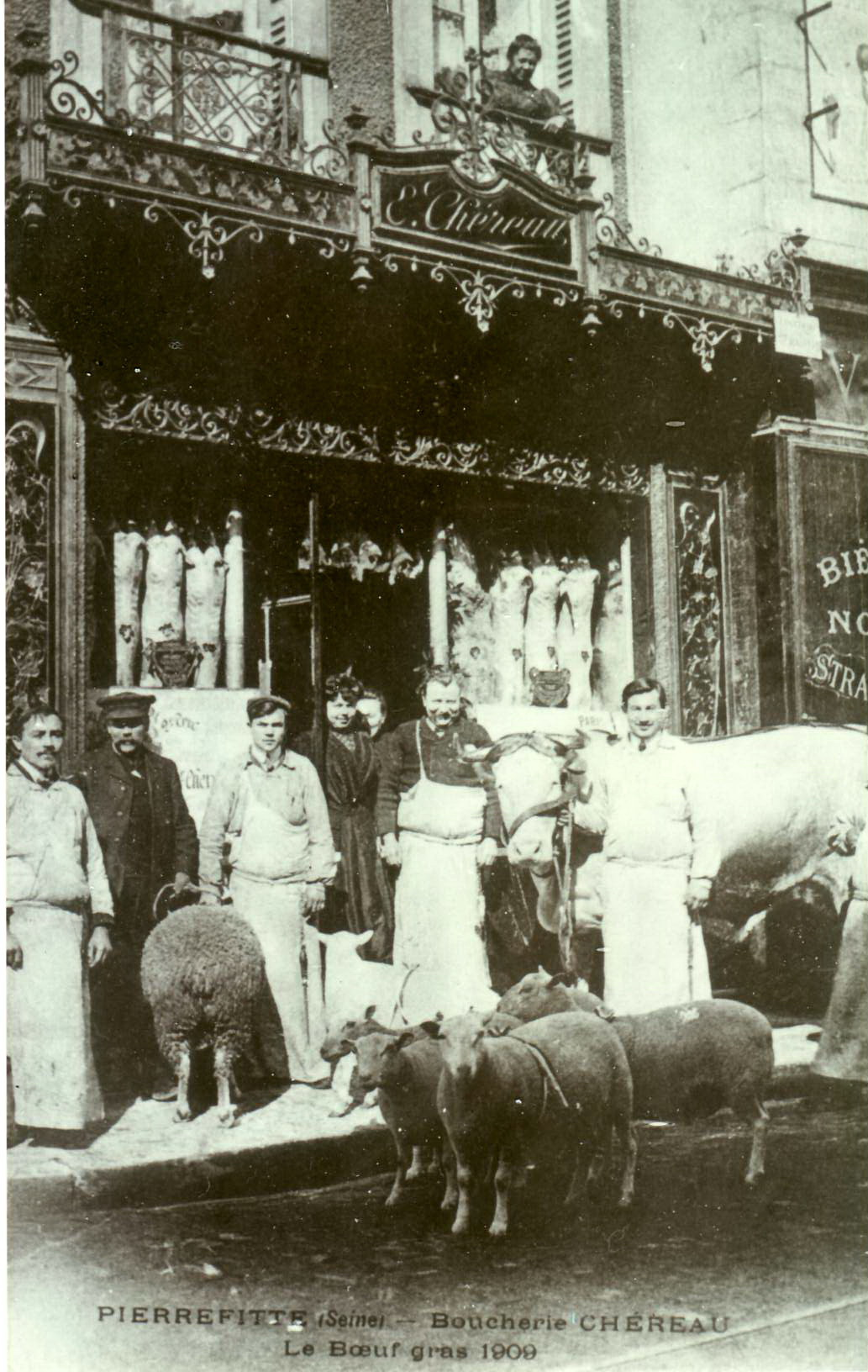
Le Bœuf Gras 1909 in Pierrefitte.

=== Montréal ===
In Montreal, on Friday, March 23, 1900, the day after Mi-Carême Thursday, a Bœuf Gras parade was organized for the first time. It took place in the evening on the ice of a skating rink, protected by walls from the aggressive winter cold, and was open to spectators for an entrance fee. The parade featured floats representing, among others, the city of Montreal, England, France and Ireland, with young girls in national costume escorted by halberdiers. Thirty musicians from l'Harmonie de Montréal provide the soundscape against a backdrop of lighting effects.

== France ==
=== Bar-sur-Seine ===
In the church of Bar-sur-Seine, a 16th-century stained glass window depicts the feast of the Boeuf Gras, which was certainly held in the town at the time.

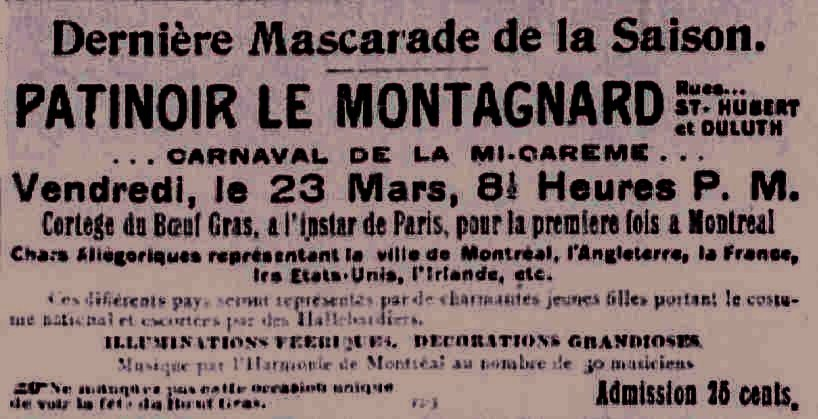
Le Bœuf Gras de Montréal 1900 advertised in La Patrie.

=== Bayonne ===
Bayonne's tradition of bœufs gras is a practice that will be listed as part of France's intangible cultural heritage in 2020.

=== Bazas ===
The Bœufs Gras procession has been held in Bazas every year since the 13th century.

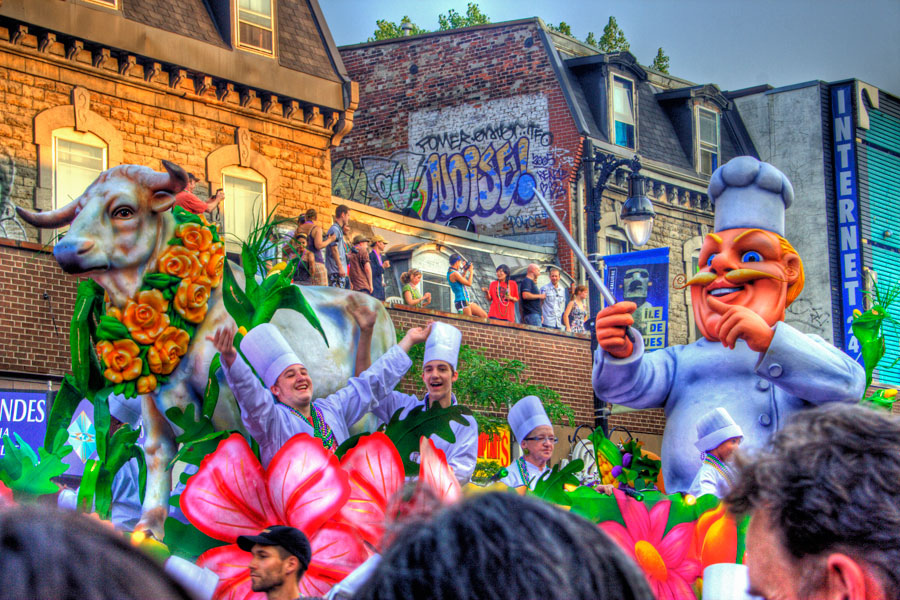
Bœuf Gras de Montréal 2010.

=== Beaumont-sur-Oise ===
Beaumont-sur-Oise's "Boeuf Gras" is a long-standing festival that has been held without interruption for many years.

=== Berck-Plage ===
In the cavalcade of May 20, 1907, a Char de la Boucherie, Char du Bœuf Gras, marches past.

=== Bergerac ===
The tradition of boeuf gras (fattened beef) was first documented in Bergerac in 1908.

=== Chalon-sur-Saône ===
Butchers, who used to walk fat oxen around town, once played a key role in the organization of the Chalon-sur-Saône Carnival. On Mardi Gras, February 12, 1907, the butchers took up the tradition of the Bœuf Gras and paraded a splendid beast around town.

=== La Chapelle Saint-Denis ===
On February 27, 1858, in his article entitled Les Bœufs gras, published in L'Univers illustré, Mr. Vauvert wrote about the Bœuf gras procession at Chapelle Saint-Denis:

Paris was not alone in enjoying the privilege of these ceremonial rides; several neighboring towns had their boeuf phénomène, complete with triumphal float and traditional Indian procession. The solemnity at La Chapelle-Saint-Denis was remarkable not so much for the pomp and circumstance displayed by its organizer, Mr. Baudeau, as for the presence of a hundred-and-seven-year-old man, the venerable Mr. Armand Gérard. Armand Gérard, who had asked to be featured as Le Temps. We have dedicated an engraving to this procession, as to that of the Parisian oxen.

The village of La Chapelle-Saint-Denis was annexed to Paris at the end of 1859; parts of its territory were attached to the communes of Saint-Ouen, Saint-Denis and Aubervilliers.

=== Charleville ===
A Bœuf Gras parades in the Mi-Carême Thursday procession March 21, 1909 in Charleville.

=== Chartres ===
On April 1, 1906, a Bœuf Gras took part in the "Cavalcade Paris-Chartres".

=== Château-Gontier ===
On May 27, 1906, a Bœuf Gras (Fat Ox) float took part in the Fête des Fleurs (Flower Festival).

=== Châtellerault ===
In his Essai about the organization of work in Poitou from the 11th century to the Revolution, published in 1900, Prosper Boissonnade describes the bœuf gras de Châtellerault:

Since the end of the 16th century, the butchers of Châtellerault, for example, have celebrated Carnival with a competition in which they exhibit the best oxen. After being presented to the officers of the seneschals, the most beautiful steer recognized by the jurors is "viellé", i.e. taken around the town's cantons and crossroads to the sound of popular music, and its lucky owner is granted a monopoly on Lenten butchery.

=== Clermont-Ferrand ===
In Clermont-Ferrand, fat oxen were driven around at Easter until around 1960.

=== Créteil ===
Around 1920, in Créteil, then a village in the Paris region, Mardi Gras and Mi-Carême were important festivals, as they were in Paris at the same time. A Bœuf Gras (fat ox) was paraded, as André Dreux reports in Créteil, mon village!:

Then came Mardi Gras, the butchers' festival. The prize went to the butcher who could show off the most beautiful ox - alive, of course. It was the "bœuf gras" (fat ox), which rarely walked on its legs along the streets of Créteil, but was hoisted onto a float, decked out and beautifully wrapped, surrounded by horsemen and people in fancy dress. The laundresses in particular were part of the festivities, and had the day off: it has to be said that there were quite a few of them since there was a small factory, among other smaller laundries. Créteil's washerwomen, if they knew how to handle the beater, like their 5th-century ancestors who, it is said, knocked out the preachers Agoard and Aglibert, at least handled this professional instrument with good humor and accompanied themselves with song. Wasn't it one of their eldest sisters who, from the wash boat opposite the "Au cochon de lait" where Victor Hugo was staying, charmed Hugo into writing a poem about it? After Mardi Gras, Carnival continued with Mi-Carême; more masquerade costumes, and merry confetti battles. Around 1920, we regularly saw masked balls organized by local societies.

=== Dax ===
A video of the Bœuf Gras competition held in Dax in February 1963 is available on the Internet.

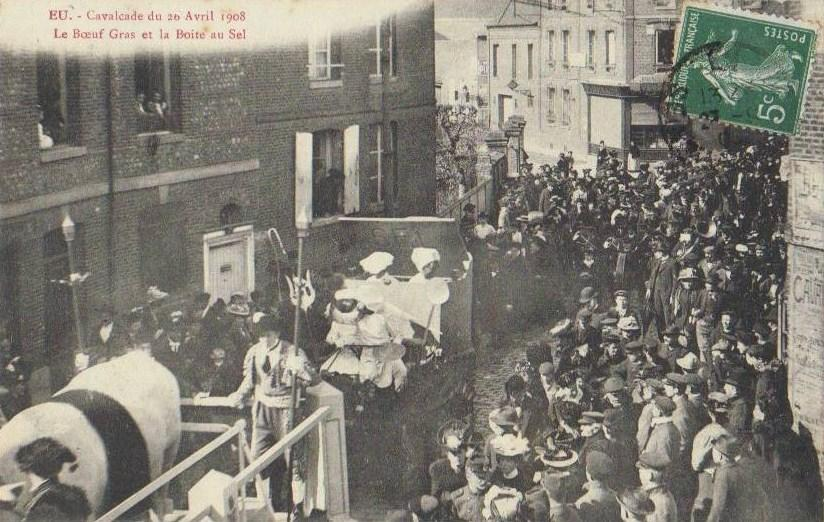

=== Dijon ===
A description of the Promenade du Boeuf Gras in Dijon is known from 1784. It shows some similarities with the one in Paris:

On Sunday November 28, Dijon's butchers, having been awarded the bounty of the fatted ox at the opening of the Seurre fairs, marched it through the town with great pomp; they rode on horseback, sword in hand, and had the Prince's music.

=== Eu ===
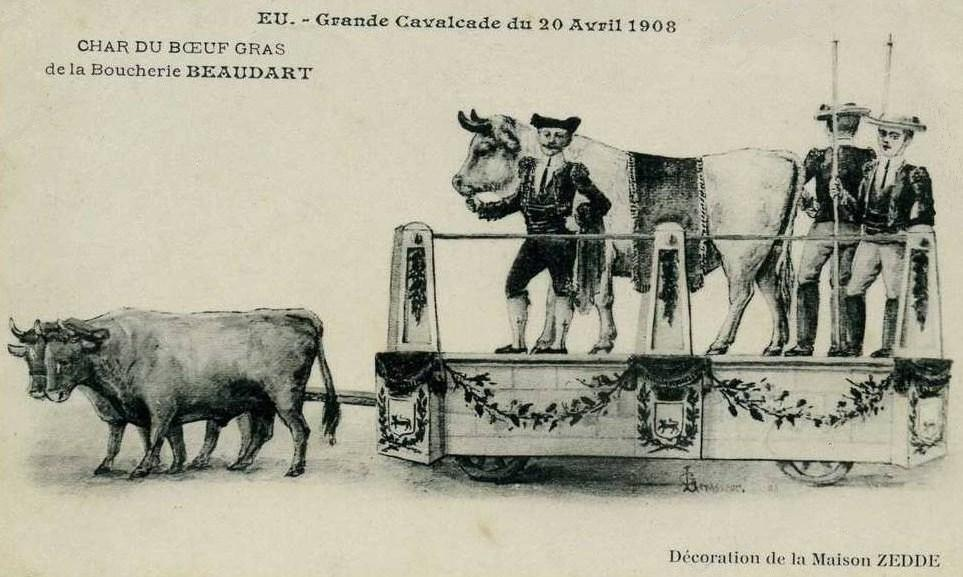
Le Bœuf Gras in Eu, 1908.

A postcard shows a float carrying a Bœuf Gras and three costumed people: a toreador and two picadors. It was part of the grand cavalcade organized in Eu on Easter Monday, April 20, 1908. Another postcard shows the Bœuf Gras and Boîte au Sel marching in Eu that day.

=== Issoudun ===
A photo from the 1930s shows the Bœuf Gras procession in Issoudun.

=== Jargeau ===
Jargeau's carnival, now the largest in the Centre-Val de Loire region, is said to have originated with the Bœuf Gras (Fat Ox) village walk in the 1880s.

=== Lunéville ===
On April 4, 1904, Lunéville hosted a cavalcade featuring a Bœuf Gras float.

=== Lurcy-Lévis ===
The tradition of the Promenade du Bœuf Gras is attested to in Lurcy-Lévis by an early postcard.

=== Marseille ===
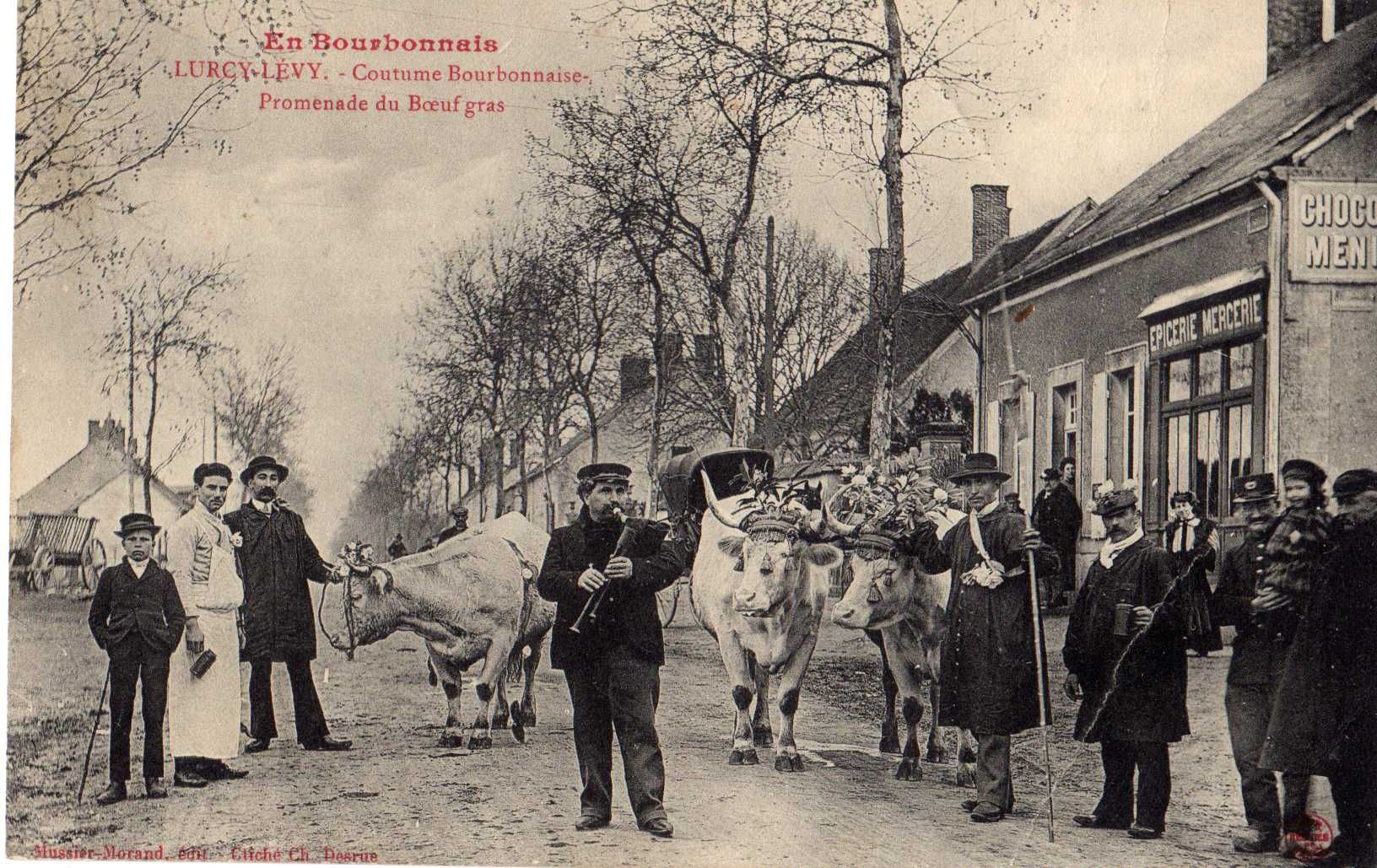
Le Bœuf Gras in Lurcy-Lévis.

In 1822, in the Dictionnaire critique des reliques et des images miraculuses by J.-A.-S. Collin de Plancy, we read:

On Corpus Christi (1), the oxen are always taken for a walk in Marseille. It carries a child on its back, representing Saint John the Baptist. Some claim that this is a remnant of paganism, but Ruffi attributes the origin of this ceremony to the confreres of the body of Our Lord "who walked an ox every year, to treat the confreres on Corpus Christi. He quotes documents from 1530, which at least prove that this procession had the use he gives it, but which do not prove that it is not a remnant of paganism (2).

(1) Nannies are careful to have their infants kiss the muzzle of the fat ox. They are convinced that this ceremony will preserve a child forever from toothache. Good women who can let the fatted ox into their homes consider it a good omen when it deposits its digestion in their house or yard.

(2) Histoire de Marseille, book XIV, chap. VI.

=== La Martinique ===
A traditional Carnival figure in Martinique used to be the Mardi Gras ox.

=== Manthelan ===
The tradition of the Manthelan beef-fat parade took place every year on Mardi Gras. It ended after the centenary celebration in 1989.

=== Montargis ===
A postcard from around 1900 shows the Bœuf Gras float on parade at "La Cavalcade du 9 Avril" in Montargis.

=== Montbrison ===
Bœuf Gras is documented in Montbrison until 1962.

=== Montluçon ===
The Bœuf Gras festival reappeared in Montluçon in the early 1990s under the name Fête, then Carnaval du Bœuf Villé.

=== Nancy ===
Bœuf gras was once paraded in Nancy. An article illustrated with a photo appeared on the subject in February 2012 in L'Est républicain.

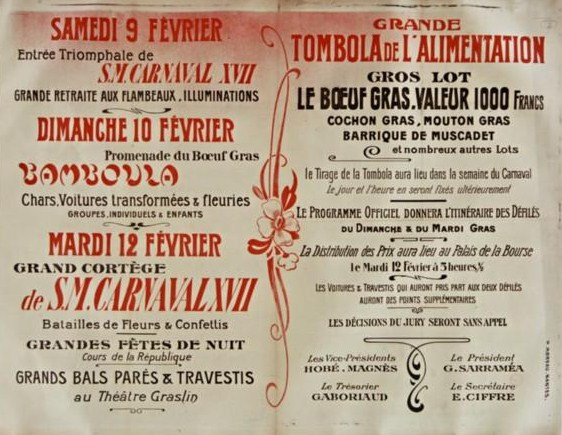
Poster announcing the 1907 Nantes Carnival.

=== Nantes ===
The Bœuf Gras appears to be an old tradition at the Nantes Carnival. It can be seen, for example, in 1907, 1914, 1920, 1921, 1923, 1924.

Photos of the Bœuf Gras at Carnaval de Nantes:

- 1914 - Tango
- 1920 - Carabin 1st
- 1921 - S. M. Gros-Plant 1st
- 1921 - S. M. Gros-Plant 1st
- 1923 - Mironton, photo 1, photo 2
- 1924 - (Name not specified on photo)

At the Nantes Carnival in 1958, the last horse-drawn carriage in the carnival parade was a Bœuf Gras float.

=== Niort ===
The Bœuf Gras was traditionally driven through Niort every year.

=== Orléans ===
We still have a description of the 1807 Orléans boeuf gras (fattened ox) walk, which is reminiscent of the Parisian tradition, including the child dressed as a sweetheart perched on the ox:

February 8, 1807. - Orléans butchers' festival and fat ox walk in the city. A huge animal, covered in a scarlet cloak, its horns adorned with flowers and ribbons, carrying on its back a pretty six-year-old child dressed as a lover, with a bow in his hand and a quiver on his back, was followed by more than fifty butcher boys, neatly dressed in white jackets, bonnets and aprons, partly on horseback and partly on foot; The procession traveled a good portion of the city, bursting with noisy joy, and stopped in front of the homes of Orléans' principal inhabitants, as well as at the doors of the best practices, whose generosity was used to make a splendid gala that rounded off the festivities.

A postcard from around 1930 shows the presentation of Bœufs gras in Orléans on Mi-Carême day.

=== Paris ===
In 19th-century Paris, the prestigious Bœuf Gras festivities took on a gigantic dimension, becoming the de facto Fête de Paris within the framework of the very large Carnaval de Paris. From 1870 onwards, the Parisian Bœuf Gras procession declined due to political and organizational difficulties, including the butchers' crisis associated with the Mathurin Couder affair (1869–1873) and the absence of a mayor of Paris until 1977. It continued to parade in the 20th century, including on a large scale in 1905 and 1936. But it disappeared after the 1951 and 1952 parades.

This was followed by a 45-year hiatus. It was revived in 1998 on the initiative of Basile Pachkoff and has marched every year since. From 2002 onwards, it returned to the traditional Carnival calendar, marching on Dimanche Gras the day before Mardi Gras.

=== Le Perray-en-Yvelines ===
A Bœuf gras float paraded in a 1908 cavalcade in Le Perray-en-Yvelines.

=== Pierrefitte-sur-Seine ===
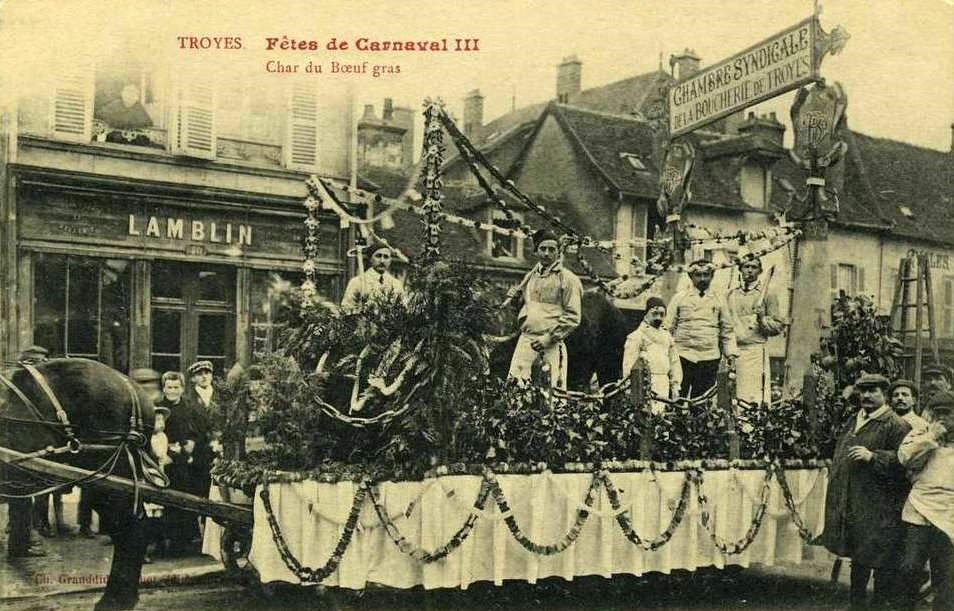
Le Bœuf Gras 1913 in Troyes.

A postcard from 1909 features the Bœuf Gras in Pierrefitte-sur-Seine, then called Pierrefitte.

=== Poitiers ===
Louis-François-Marie Bellin de La Liborlière wrote in 1846 about life in Poitiers before 1789:

As the law of quadragesimal abstinence was generally observed, each year a Lenten butcher was appointed, with sole responsibility for the public sale of meat during the period when this type of food became an exception. It was this butcher who, at Carnival time, led the fattened ox through the streets of the town with great pomp and ceremony.

The "boucherie de carême" was the only butcher's shop authorized to sell meat during the forty days of Lent to those dispensed from fasting by the bishop. This was a prestigious and lucrative position.

=== Rennes ===
A Bœuf Gras was paraded at the 1927 Mi-Carême in Rennes and another at the 1930 Mi-Carême.

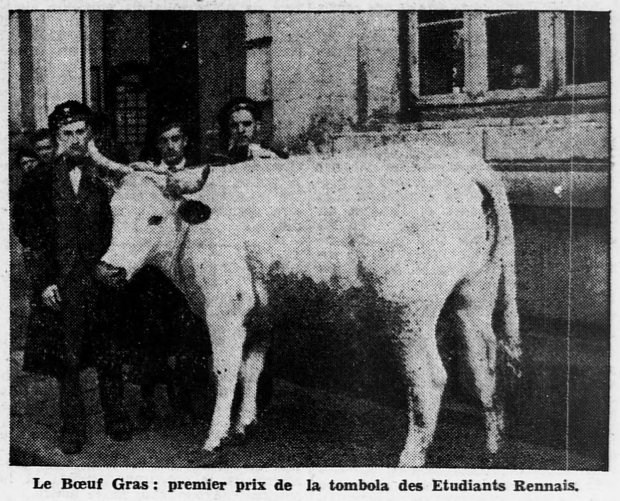
The Bœuf Gras of Rennes students in 1938.

The first prize in the Rennes student tombola for Mi-Carême 1938 is a Bœuf Gras.

=== Rochefort ===
A photo of the Bœuf Gras parade held in Rochefort on Mi-Carême Thursday, March 28, 1935, can be viewed on the Internet. The accompanying commentary states that this parade took place every year at the time.

=== Saint-Germain-des-Fossés ===
A postcard shows the presentation of a Bœuf Gras de Pâques in Saint-Germain-des-Fossés in 1925.

=== Saint-Pierre-et-Miquelon ===
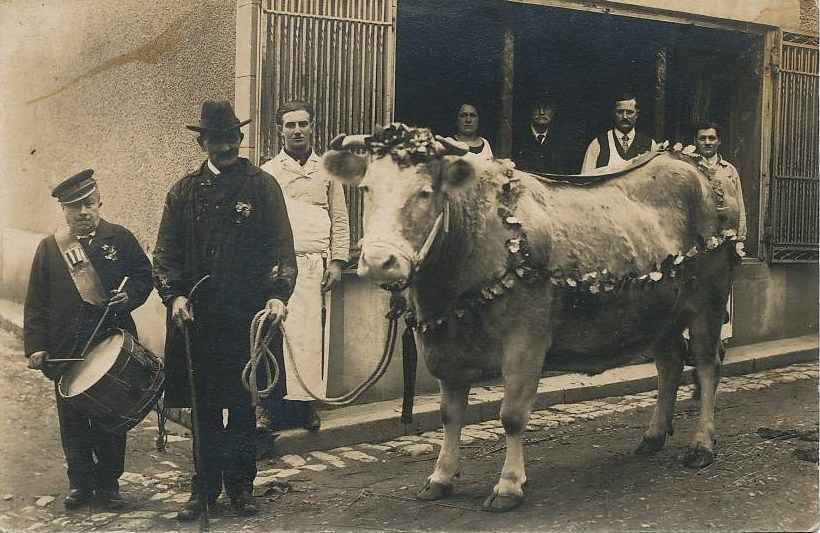
Le Bœuf Gras in Sancoins around 1930.

Mardi Gras 1929 saw a Bœuf Gras parade in the islands of Saint-Pierre-et-Miquelon.

=== Sancoins ===
A postcard shows the Bœuf Gras in Sancoins around 1930.

=== Troyes ===
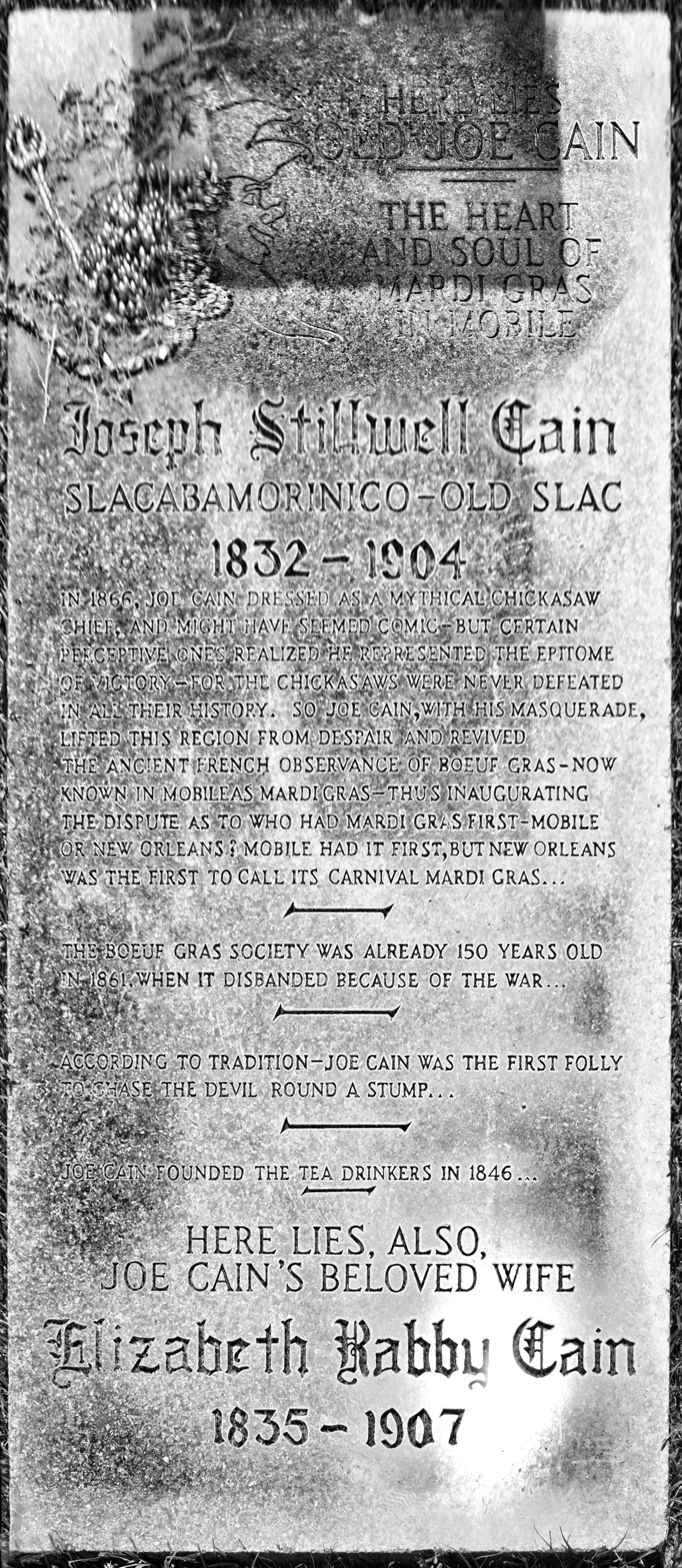
Joseph Stillwel Cain's gravestone in Mobile, featuring the Bœuf Gras.

An old postcard shows the bœuf gras float parading through Troyes for Carnaval 1913.

=== Versailles ===
In 1849, the Bœuf Gras Parisien did not parade in Paris, but in Versailles. It was christened Californian, in reference to the California gold rush that began that same year.

La Revue comique wrote about the Versailles parade:

And this is how the Californian, the fat ox of 1849, stripped of his Parisian royalty, found himself reduced to strolling his exiled majesty through the deserted streets of pompous Versailles, under the disdainful eyes of the local dowagers! What a fall! But also what a philosophical lesson! The ox cast melancholy glances at the city of Louis XIV; the city whose passions, affections and memories lie beyond our frontier, looked with perfect indifference at the Californian.

A Bœuf Gras took place in Versailles in 1895. It was announced on March 21 of that year by the newspaper La Presse:

In Versailles and Saint-Germain-en-Laye, the Mi-Carême festival has been postponed to Sunday March 24.

Preparations in Versailles were underway, and the ox that would be paraded through the streets would also be the main prize in a tombola for the benefit of the poor. As the prize may have been impractical for the winner to keep, it would be bought back for 1,000 francs.

=== Le Vésinet ===
An Internet page devoted to the history of Le Vésinet states:

Before 1900, the Bœuf-Gras parade took place before the Marguerite festival. A huge ox, decorated with flowers and tricolored ribbons, was led through the streets of Le Vésinet by a brass band. The animal belonged to the Filquière butcher's shop, and was driven by Mr. Filquière himself, dressed in the traditional blue smock.

=== Villeneuve-sur-Yonne ===
The May 7, 1922 cavalcade featured a Char du Bœuf gras.

== Italy ==
=== Carrù ===
In Carrù, the birthplace of the Piedmontese cattle breed, a Bœuf gras fair reserved for Piedmontese cattle that has been held every year since 1910.

=== Cavriago ===
For over two centuries, Cavriago has been home to a fattened beef fair.

=== Moncalvo ===
Moncalvo has had a fattened beef fair for nearly four centuries.

=== Nizza Monferrato ===
In Nizza Monferrato, in the province of Asti, there has been a Fiera del Bue grasso et del Manzo - Fattened Beef and Beef Fair - since the 17th century.

== United States ==
=== Mobile ===
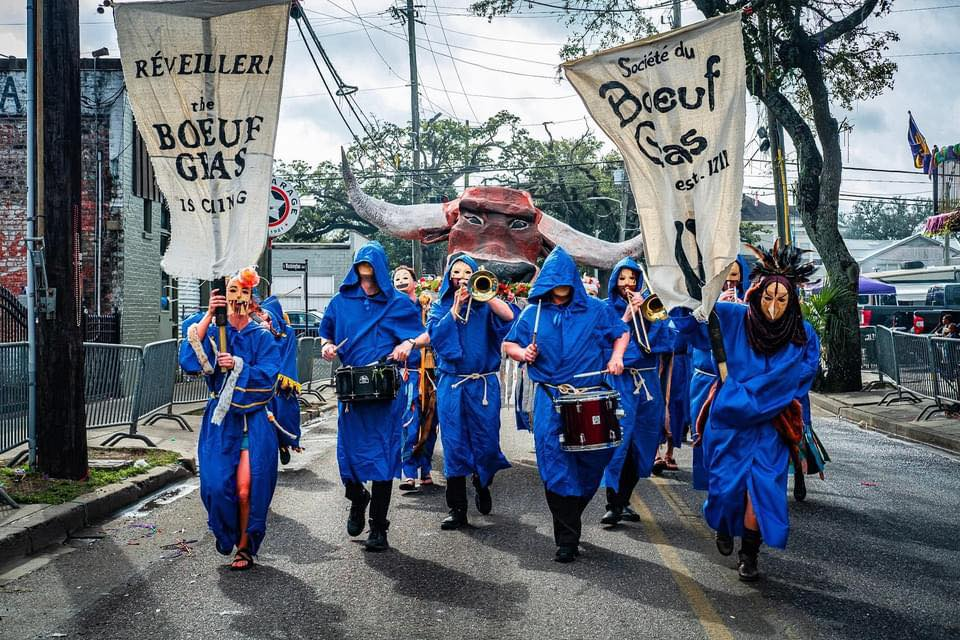
Société du Bœuf Gras in Mobile

In 1710, one of the first carnival societies, the Société du Bœuf Gras, was founded in Mobile, French America. The society marched continuously for 150 years on Mardi Gras day, from 1711 to 1861. At the head of the procession, the Boeuf Gras is represented by the head of an enormous bull, pushed alone on wheels by sixteen men. The tradition of the Boeuf Gras, which came to Mobile from France, was interrupted in 1861 due to the Civil War. The Société du Bœuf Gras was revived in 2021. The procession now parades along Dauphin Street on the morning of Mardi Gras, featuring a large papier-mâché bull's head.

=== New Orléans ===
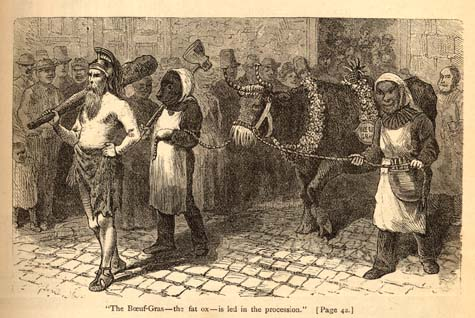
Le Bœuf Gras at the New Orleans Carnival, engraving of 1873. (Note: Engraving showing the Bœuf Gras of the Rex company in New Orleans marching on Mardi Gras 1873. At the head marches the sacrificer is inspired by the Paris Boeuf Gras procession. Engraved by James Wells Champney, captioned "The Boeuf-Gras (the fat ox) is led in the procession." This engraving is taken from Edward King's book "The Great South" published in 1875.)

New Orleans Carnival once featured a Bœuf Gras procession. An engraving from 1873 shows it. It bears a French name and includes a sacrificer armed with a club taken from a Parisian ceremony. At least in 1873, the New Orleans Carnival paraded a real live ox preceded by the sacrificer carrying a club, a costumed character typical of the Parisian parade. Since 1909, the live animal has been replaced by a float bearing a giant sculpted effigy, featured in the Fat Tuesday parade of the Krewe of Rex; New Orleans lore has it that seeing the Boeuf Gras on carnival day guarantees a year of good luck.

=== Shreveport ===
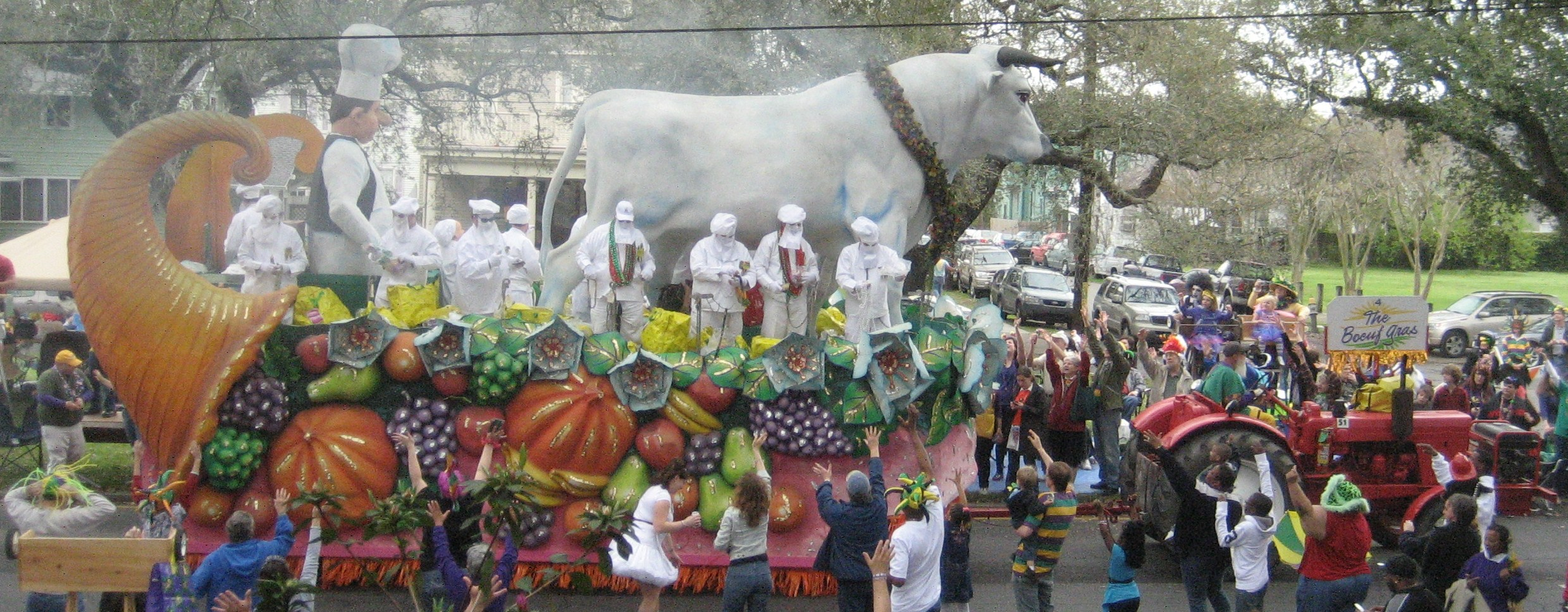
Bœuf Gras at the 2011 New Orleans Carnival.

On the Internet, you can see a photo of a monumental Bœuf gras artificial parading on its float in the Krewe of Centaur (Centaur Carnival Society) procession during Shreveport Carnival 2009.

== See also ==
- Ox
- Butcher
- Carnival
- Carnaval de Périgueux
- Mardi gras
- Mardi gras (New Orleans)
- Rex parade
- Fin gras du Mézenc
- Parade of the Fat Ox at the Paris Carnival
