= Carnaval de Périgueux =

Festive tradition in France

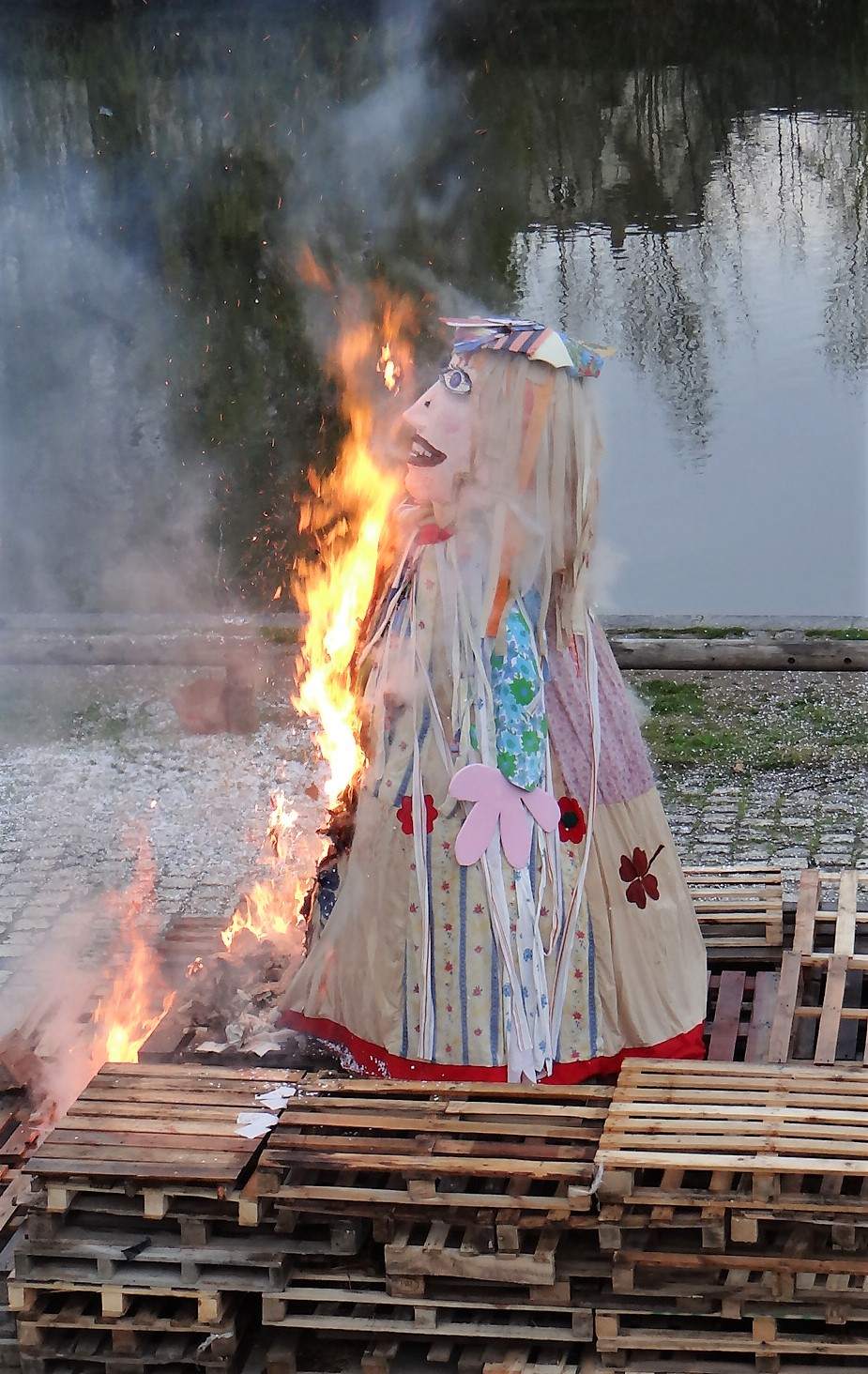
Carnaval de Périgueux, 2022

Carnaval de Périgueux is a popular festival held in Périgueux, in the Dordogne department. Part of a festive tradition that dates back to the 11th century, the carnival today consists of a parade of floats and groups of musicians along the city's boulevards. The procession ends with the judgement and cremation of Pétassou on the quays of the Isle.

Listed in France's Inventory of Intangible Cultural Heritage since 2010, the carnival has become famous for its comic, caricatured and satirical personification of Pétassou and the many local beliefs and legends associated with him.

== History ==
=== The beginnings of carnival in the Middle Ages ===
As early as the 11th century, carnivals were organized in various districts of Périgueux to coincide with Mardi Gras. Games and customs were prepared and staged in a codified manner to control the disorder and popular jubilation of Mardi Gras. In the 14th century, banquets paid for by the consulate were organized in the Coderc Plaza, in the company of the city's three main religious communities (the Daughters of St. Clare, the Friars Minor and the Friars Preachers). The main dishes served are salt pork, of Limoges origin, and beef, in the tradition of Bœuf Gras. The distribution of these meals in a context of regular famine often gave rise to outbursts and violent jostling. In 1347, eight people were suffocated to death in the church of Saint-Front when crowds flocked to receive the "Mardi-Gras charity", officialized in 1329. In addition to the meals, the town organizes a race reserved for women along the banks of theIsle or, in the event offlooding, between the Porte Taillefer and the Porte de la Cité. During the festivities, the municipality of Périgueux also gave each citizen two deniers and a maille. To consolidate their local power and control over the city's activities, certain wealthy bourgeois and nobles donate rents for the organization of Mardi Gras.

From the 17th century onwards, Carnival became a threat to the established political and religious order. Despite the determination of local authorities to organize it within a precise regulatory framework, excesses persisted. While attempts to remove carnival from the popular calendar were in vain, it became a moment of resistance and revolt for citizens. In the 19th century, when moral conventions imposed by the Church were strong, the race formerly reserved for women became a race for transvestite men, whose skirts and cotillions deliberately slowed down and ridiculed for fun.

Two Ash Wednesday traditions in particular were organized locally. Closely related to theatellane, the first involved cuckolded or beaten husbands riding on a donkey. They were taken for a ride and publicly mocked throughout the town, dressed in a dress, kerchief and headdress. The second tradition, less widespread than the first, is called the "horns":

"On this day [...], all those who got married in the carnival year that ended a year earlier, on the same day, gather in disguise and masks in the old Place de la Rode. The last groom among them carries a hay fork with two ox horns stuck in the two prongs [...]. The troop [...] makes its way in procession to the home of the first groom of the carnival year ending on this day. In front of the door, people line up in a semicircle; the music gives the aubade, then falls silent. Then the oldest groom in the group steps forward, and [...] calls the man three times by his [...] nickname. [...] So he arrives, and when he's on the doorstep, the music bursts out raucously. Then silence falls, and the man steps forward [...]. He is first made to bow low to the pitchfork held in the center of the circle [...], then made to kneel [...] and recite farcical questions [...]. When he has answered, he is made to recite, dictating word for word, a profession of faith to burst with laughter, in which he promises, among other things, to be deaf and blind. [The] horns are lowered towards him and crown his head for a moment, and then he is made to kiss them [...]. The leader of the troupe pronounces a burlesque formula [...], makes the man stand up and embraces him, while the music resumes with great noise. [...] The whole troupe heads for the second groom's house, where [the farce] begins again [...], then on to the third, and so on, until the last groom, who carries the horned contraption to the inn, where the troupe dines in great merriment."

— Eugène Le Roy

=== Contemporary times ===
After the carnival came to a halt several times, in 1914 (First World War), 1920 and 1939 (Second World War), it remained a social gathering reserved almost exclusively for young men until 1950. The local authorities sought to control the side-effects of the festivities, issuing a prefectoral decree on July 11, 1921 banning the sale and throwing of streamers on the public highway. The ban was lifted by a new decree dated February 9, 1925. The aim was to escape from family and economic worries, particularly those linked to the two world wars. In the 1960s, carnival disappeared with the emergence of new, more modern means of playful expression.

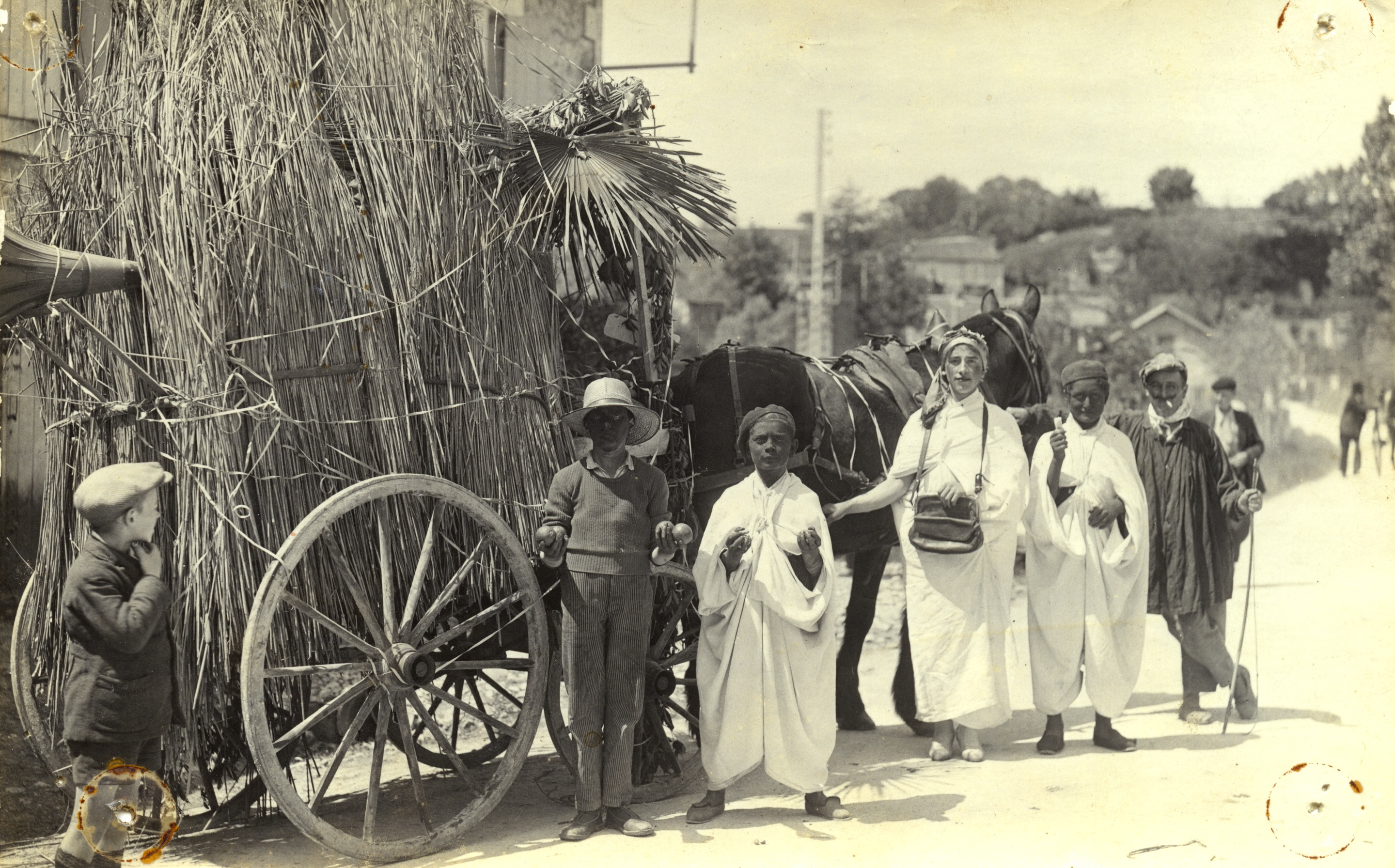
Char with colonial-inspired decor and dressed-up children.

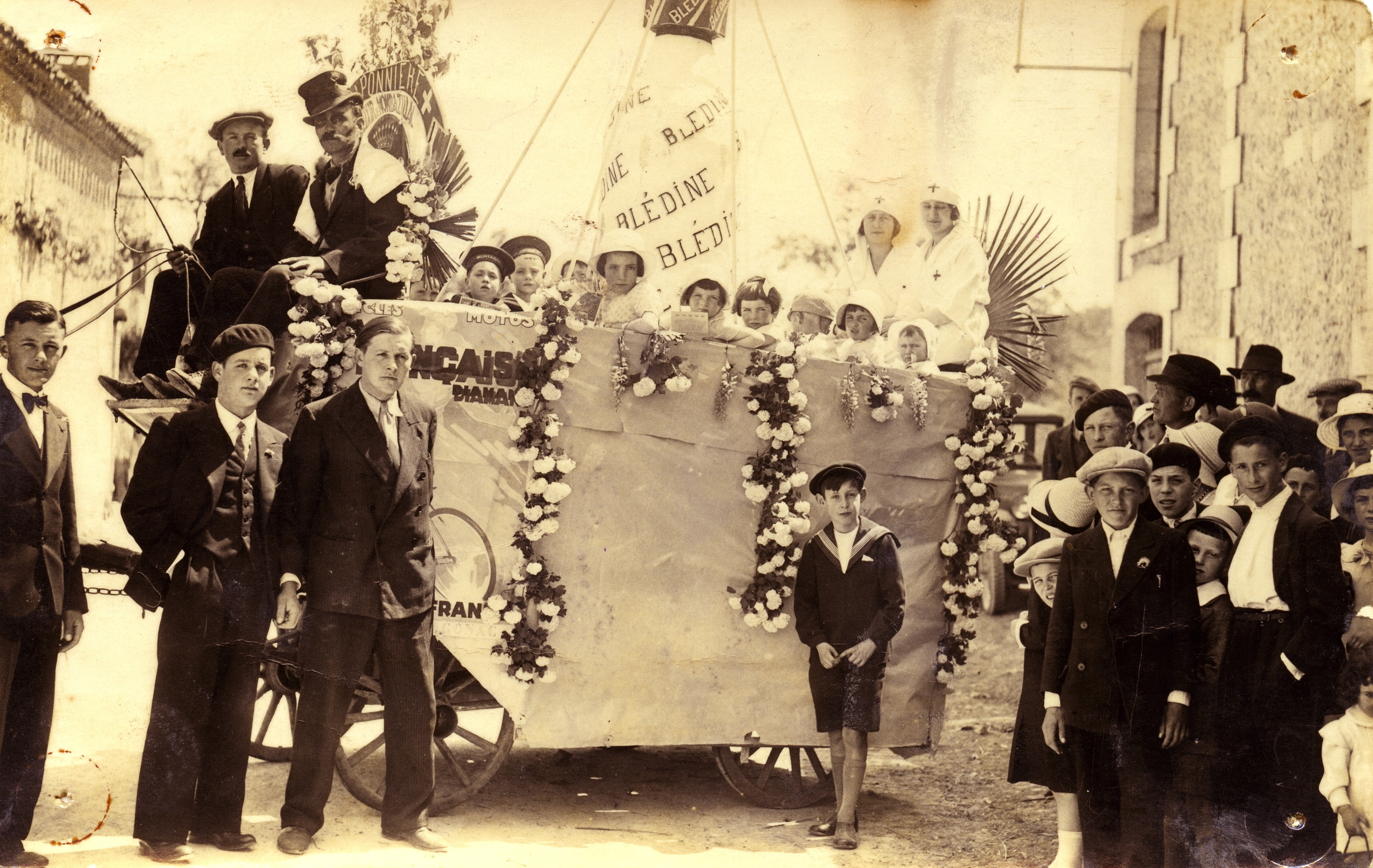
Char surrounded by children.

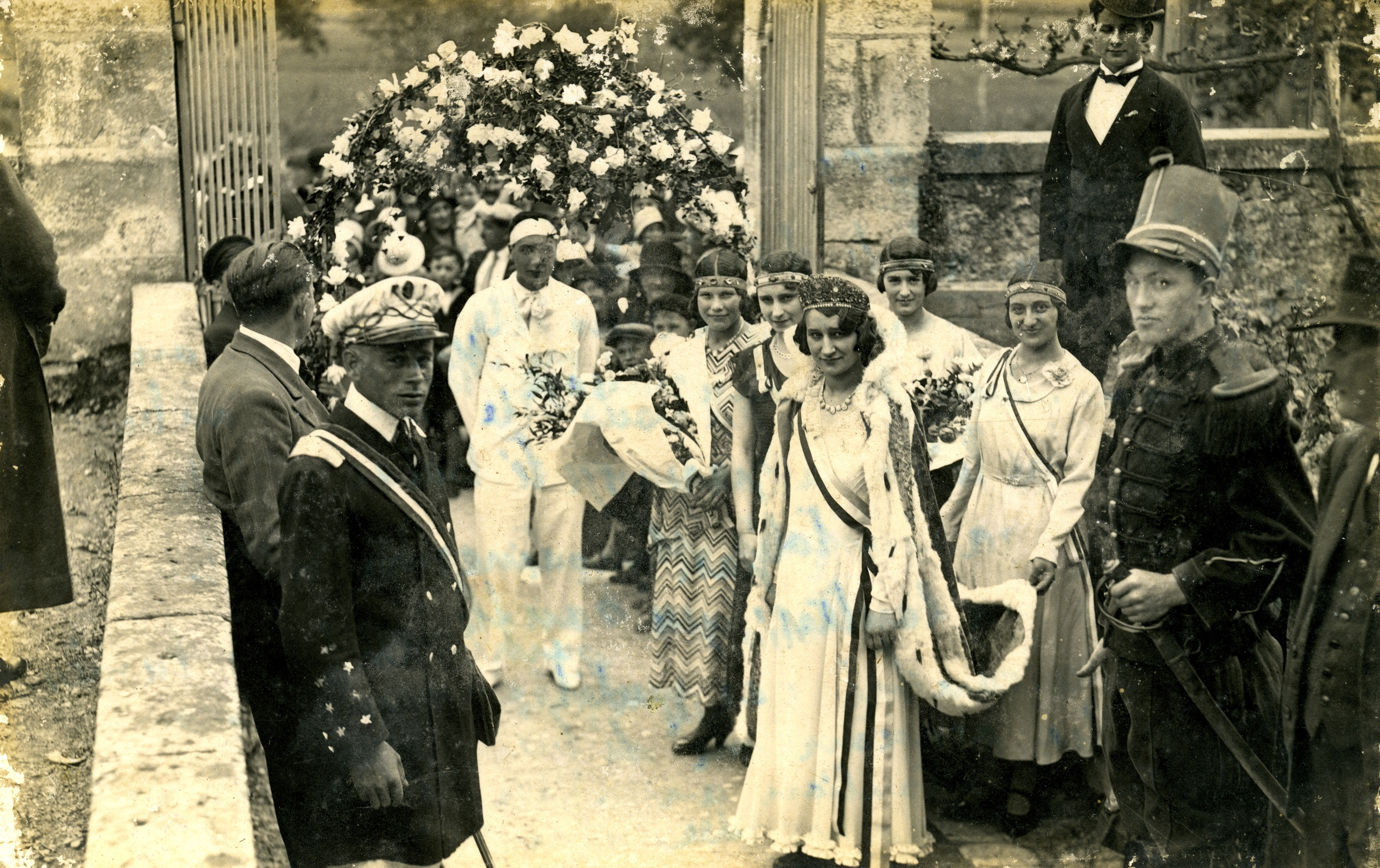
Scene with girls dressed as princesses and men as soldiers.

Carnival in its current form was officially rehabilitated in 1983. Increasingly a satire of local political life, the Périgueux carnival revived a number of controversies. Several schools in Périgueux banned the wearing of costumes on Mardi Gras. In 1990, the carnival was accused of "undermining the morale of the Périgourdins", resulting in "a slight apathy on the part of the population as a whole".

In 1992, French artist Martial Raysse painted Le Carnaval à Périgueux, one of his greatest compositions. Created using the tempera on canvas technique, this full-scale frieze (300 × 800 cm) depicts a contemporary popular festival scene in a style that runs counter to the artistic trends of the time. The painting is the result of sketches and sketches made several years earlier, based on a street scene seen by chance in Périgueux. First shown at the Jeu de paume in 1992, the artwork is part of the temporary exhibition dedicated to the artist between May 14 and September 22, 2014 at the Centre Pompidou (Paris). Part of the Pinault collection, it is now on show at Palazzo Grassi (Venice).

On December 12, 2008, as part of the "Institut Occitan 2008-2010" mission led by Christine Escarmant-Pauvert, a survey was carried out in Périgueux to identify the carnival. The investigator met with Christian Lafaye, a member of the carnival's organizing committee and head of the town's Calandreta school. Since July 5, 2010, the Périgueux carnival has been listed in France's Inventory of Intangible Cultural Heritage, in recognition of its history and its role in local tourism.

The 2020 edition of the carnival is exceptionally cancelled due to the COVID-19 pandemic in France.

The Périgueux Carnival remains a key element in the cultural heritage and dynamism of the city of Périgueux. It attracts several thousand people every year. The date fluctuates according to the school vacation calendar and tourist numbers.

== Description ==
A few days before the start of the festivities, the Périgueux Carnival Committee suggests that a stranger has been spotted in the surrounding countryside. To create the myth, the organizers sometimes use a local news item that has made the headlines. The scenario is broadcast in the local press.

On carnival day, participants wear masks and costumes. Confetti, balloons, fairground items and drinks are sold on the streets.

Périgueux's carnival consists of parades of floats pulled by trucks and strolls by musicians (bandas, brass bands, percussionists) along the city's boulevards. Merry-go-rounds are located nearby. The festivities revolve around the judgment of the unknown person presented as the king of the festival: "Pétassou" - Petaçon, in Occitan, which describes the mannequin's garment made of petaces, pieces of fabric to be patched - (or "Carnaval"). Made at the start of the carnival season by the organizing committee, schools and neighborhood associations, the mannequin that symbolizes Pétassou takes on a human form. Generally speaking, it's made of a wooden frame, stuffed with straw and sometimes filled with firecrackers. He's often decorated, costumed and dressed in the mask of a famous character.

During the parade of floats, Pétassou appears at the head or end of the procession, seated or astride a donkey or in an old carriage. He is carried through the town to the place of judgement. At this precise moment, the mannequin is accompanied by his living double, who plays the role of Petassou as the accused. A courtroom table, surrounded by judges and lawyers, is set up in a large town square. Framed by guards or gendarmes, Pétassou is charged with all the misdeeds, thefts and crimes perpetrated in Périgueux. The trial speech, traditionally transmitted orally, is often reworked to reflect current events. In 1990, Pétassou was renamed "General Petacescu", in reference to the dictator Nicolae Ceaușescu, executed at the end of the Romanian revolution in 1989. It can sometimes be rendered partially or totally in Occitan. Once condemned in public, Pétassou is put to death and usually ends up burned below Saint-Front Cathedral, on the quays of the Isle. A few people then sing the popular song Adieu paure Carnaval.

Pétassou is sometimes associated with "Pétassette", his wife. In 1990, she was renamed "Elena", after the dictator's wife.

== Significance ==
Carnival in Périgueux is an important date in the popular calendar. Citizens indulge in festive and dietary excesses before Lent. The idea is to forget constraints, taboos, prohibitions, social institutions and the law.

The character of Pétassou embodies the unity of a community. The incredible stories attributed to him are based on real events, from which only the comic, caricatural, parodic or derisory aspects are extracted. Through Pétassou's judgment, everyone unconsciously takes the opportunity to stigmatize him, whether as a cuckolded husband, a mean-spirited person, a member of the clergy or an overambitious politician. Pétassou's expeditious judgment is a criticism of a justice system that is too swift and often called into question. One of the primary aims of his cremation is to see all past misfortunes vanish, before starting afresh in a positive light.

Unlike the carnivals of Agen, Bordeaux or Toulouse, Périgueux's is well known for the satirical scenarios it creates each year: economic difficulties, municipal management, unusual news items, or even current events among shopkeepers.

== Local beliefs and legends ==
Carnival is the subject of many beliefs. One of these is that the carnival period seems conducive to the elimination of pests, including fleas, spiders, cockroaches, moles and gnats. Another belief is to perform a few fertility rituals during the carnival period, to improve crop yields and make livestock prosper: throw spoonfuls of broth into the cowshed before breakfast; place a flat bone on the head of the oldest cow; don't break an egg on carnival day; reserve the most beautiful pancake of the period for the hens to multiply their laying; fire a shotgun on carnival night.

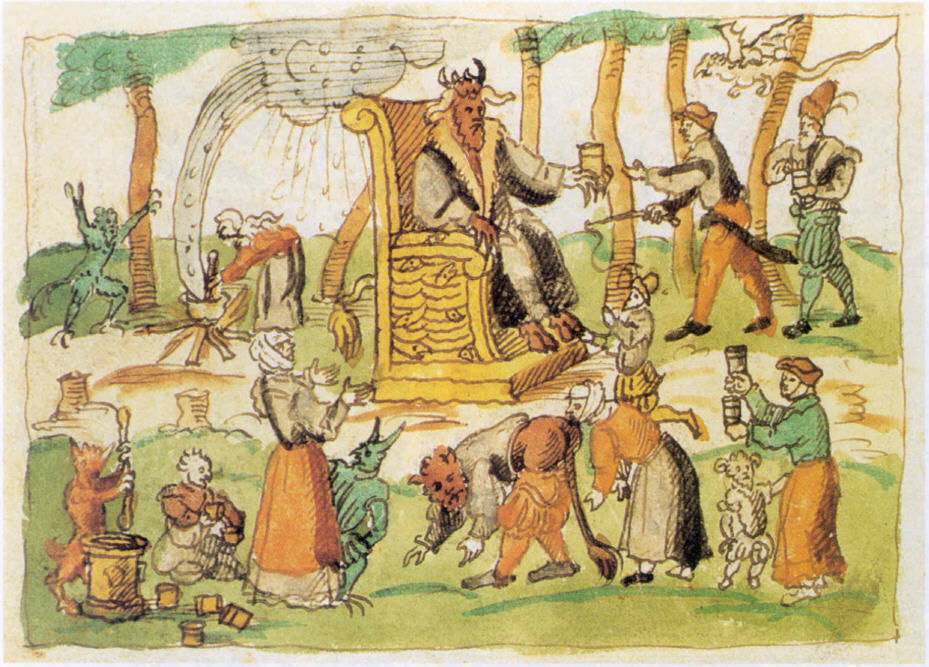
Witches' Sabbath (Chronicle by Johann Jakob Wick, 16th century).

According to local legends, the Devil takes part in the festivities. Having also gone to excess on Carnival Day, that same evening he becomes master of ceremonies at the Sabbat, a witchcraft gathering of his servants - witches and werewolves - in an abandoned clearing. He is personified as a grinning, tortured man holding a pitchfork in his hand, or as a goat with large horns and a tail. This belief reminds citizens that, the day after Carnival, the Devil is always present and will not tolerate any faux-pas.

Several weather sayings are also formulated in patois to link the carnival period with weather forecasts:

"If it rains on Carnival day, year of buckwheat."

"Carnaval baveux, Pâques foireux.

"If it rains for Carnival, good year for nuts."

"On Carnival day, if the hawthorn drips, there'll be buckwheat."

"We've never seen a Mardi-Gras outside of a February new moon."

"February moon brings Mardi-Gras."

== See also ==
- The Soufflaculs of Nontron
- Coderc Plaza

== Bibliography ==
- Magne, Christian (1992). Le Carnaval en Périgord. Collection Centaurée (in French). PLB Éditions. ISBN 9782869520394.
- Penaud, Guy (2003). Le grand livre de Périgueux (in French). Éditions de la Lauze. ISBN 2-912032-50-4.
