= Hôtel de Ville, Châtellerault =

Town hall in Châtellerault, France

Hôtel de Ville
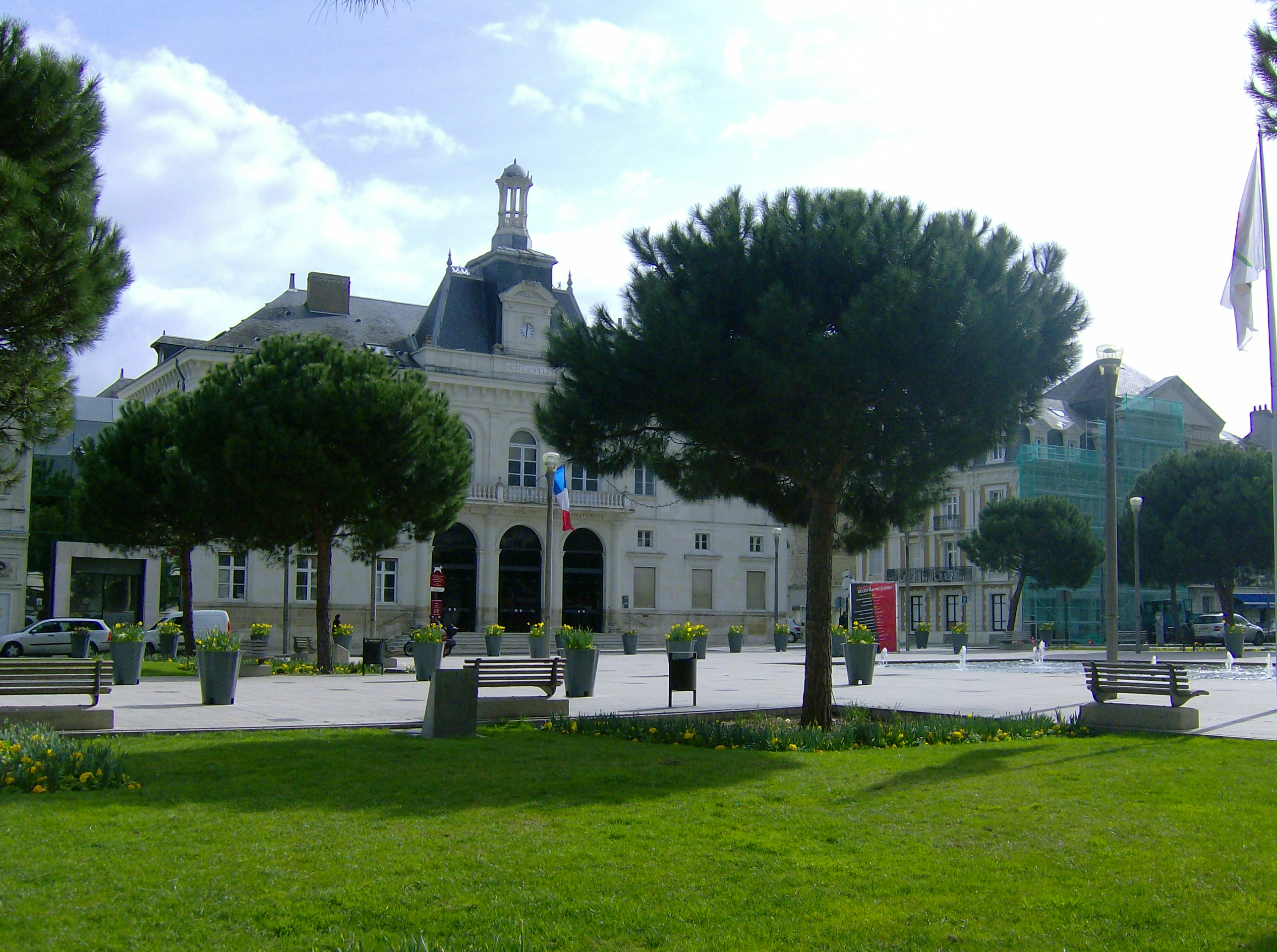
- The main frontage of the Hôtel de Ville in March 2008
- Interactive map of the Hôtel de Ville area

General information
- Type: City hall
- Architectural style: Neoclassical style
- Location: Châtellerault, France
- Coordinates: 46.8180°N 0.5461°E
- Completed: 1850

Design and construction
- Architect: Jacques Dulin

The Hôtel de Ville (French pronunciation: [otɛl də vil], City Hall) is a municipal building in Châtellerault, Vienne, in western France, standing on Boulevard Blossac.

== History ==
Following the French Revolution, the town council initially met in the house of the mayor at the time. This arrangement continued until the early 1840s, when there was a significant increase in population, largely associated with the local arms factory. The town council led by the mayor, Paul Proa, decided to commission a combined town hall and courthouse. The site they selected was occupied by the Couvent des Minimes (Convent of the Minimes). The convent was established by the Jean D'Armagnac and his wife, Yolande de la Haye, in 1495. A chapel was erected for the friars in 1527 and, after it was badly damaged in the French Wars of Religion, it was rebuilt on a larger scale in 1608. During the French Revolution, the convent was seized by the state, the friars were driven out, and the building was acquired by the council in 1791. The Théâtre Blossac (Blossac Theatre) was built on the site of the chapel in 1842, leaving a large area to the south of the theatre available for the town hall and courthouse.

Construction started with the demolition of the remainder of the old convent in 1848. The new building was designed by Jacques Dulin in the neoclassical style, built in ashlar stone and was completed in 1850. The layout consisted of a main block flanked by two wings, which were projected forward, facing south onto what is now Avenue Georges Clemenceau. The main block and east wing formed the courthouse, while the west wing formed the town hall. The design of the courthouse involved a symmetrical main frontage of 15 bays facing onto Avenue Georges Clemenceau. The central section of three bays, which was slightly projected forward, featured three round-headed openings on the ground floor and three round-headed windows on the first floor. The openings on the ground floor were flanked by Doric order columns supporting an entablature with triglyphs, while the windows on the first floor were flanked by pilasters supporting a modillioned cornice and a pediment with a carving of a sitting figure, representing Justice, in the tympanum.

Following the implementation of the Municipal Organization Act of 1884, the council led by the mayor, Ernest Godard, decided to improve the west wing, which accommodated the municipal offices, to create a monumental west-facing façade. This was achieved by inserting a new central section of three bays into the hitherto plain-looking frontage. The new section was designed in a similar style to the central section of the courthouse, but instead of the pediment, there was a balcony on the first floor, a clock above the central bay and, behind the clock, a steep roof surmounted by an octagonal belfry. The improvement works were completed in 1889.

Following the liberation of the town on 4 September 1944, during the Second World War, the French Forces of the Interior placed themselves at strategic locations such as the local barracks and the town hall.
