= Charles Sabourin =

French pathologist (1849–1920)

- Born: 19 June 1849; Châtellerault, Vienne, France
- Died: 6 November 1920 (aged 71); Puy-de-Dôme, Auvergne-Rhône-Alpes, France
- Occupation: Pathologist

Charles Sabourin (19 June 1849 – 6 November 1920) was a French pathologist. Sabourin was born in Châtellerault, Vienne, France. Sabourin studied medicine in Paris, France. Sabourin served in hospitals of Paris. He specialized in medical research and therapy, receiving recognition for his work involving lung anatomy and pathology. Subsequently, he opened a sanatorium in Durtol for treating patients with tuberculosis and pulmonary tuberculosis. He was first physician to provide a comprehensive description of nodular regenerative hyperplasia of the liver. In French medical literature the eponym Cirrhose alcoolo-tuberculeuse de Hutinel et Sabourin is used to describe hypertrophic fatty cirrhosis of the liver of alcoholic or tuberculous origin. It is named along with physician Victor Henri Hutinel (1849–1933).

Sabourin died in Puy-de-Dôme.

Today, the Hôpital-sanatorium Sabourin, north of Clermont-Ferrand, is named in his honour.

== Publications ==
• La glande biliare et l'hyperplasia nodulaire du foie. Revue de médecine, Paris, 1884, 4: 322–333.
