= Oscar Sabourin =

Canadian ice hockey player

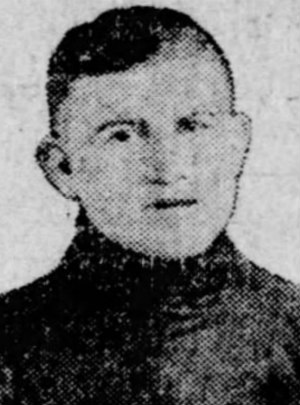
- Saboruin c. 1916
- Born: August 9, 1897; Ottawa, Ontario, Canada
- Died: September 20, 1937 (aged 40); Detroit, Michigan, U.S.
- Position: Defence
- Played for: Saskatoon Crescents
- Playing career: 1917–1922

Joseph Oscar Albert Sabourin (August 9, 1897 – September 20, 1937) was a professional ice hockey player from Ottawa. He played with the Saskatoon Crescents of the Western Canada Hockey League during the 1922–23 season.

He died suddenly in 1937 in Detroit, Michigan.
