= Châtellerault =

Châtellerault Châteulrô / Chateleràud (Poitevin–Saintongeais)
- Subprefecture and commune
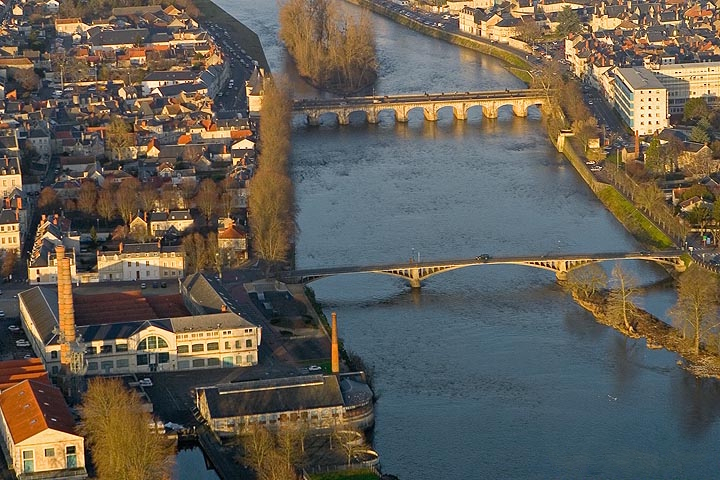
- An aerial view of the centre of Châtellerault

- Coat of arms
- Location of Châtellerault
- Location within France Location within Nouvelle-Aquitaine
- Coordinates: 46°49′04″N 0°32′46″E
- Country: France
- Region: Nouvelle-Aquitaine
- Department: Vienne
- Arrondissement: Châtellerault
- Canton: Châtellerault-1, 2 and 3
- Intercommunality: CA Grand Châtellerault

Government
  - Mayor (2026–32): Anne-Florence Bourat
- Area^{1}: 51.96 km^{2} (20.06 sq mi)
- Elevation: 60 m (200 ft)
- Highest elevation: 134 m (440 ft)
- Lowest elevation: 42 m (138 ft)
- Population (2023): 31,003
  - Density: 596.7/km^{2} (1,545/sq mi)
- Time zone: UTC+01:00 (CET)
  - Summer (DST): UTC+02:00 (CEST)
- INSEE/Postal code: 86066 /86100
- ^{1} French Land Register data, which excludes lakes, ponds, glaciers > 1 km^{2} (0.386 sq mi or 247 acres) and river estuaries.

Châtellerault (pronounced [ʃatɛlʁo]; Poitevin-Saintongeais: Châteulrô/Chateleràud; Occitan: Chastelairaud) is a commune in the Vienne department in the Nouvelle-Aquitaine region in France. It is located in the northeast of the former province Poitou, and the residents are called Châtelleraudais.

== Geography ==
Châtellerault lies on the river Vienne, a few km downstream from its confluence with the Clain in Cenon-sur-Vienne.

== History ==
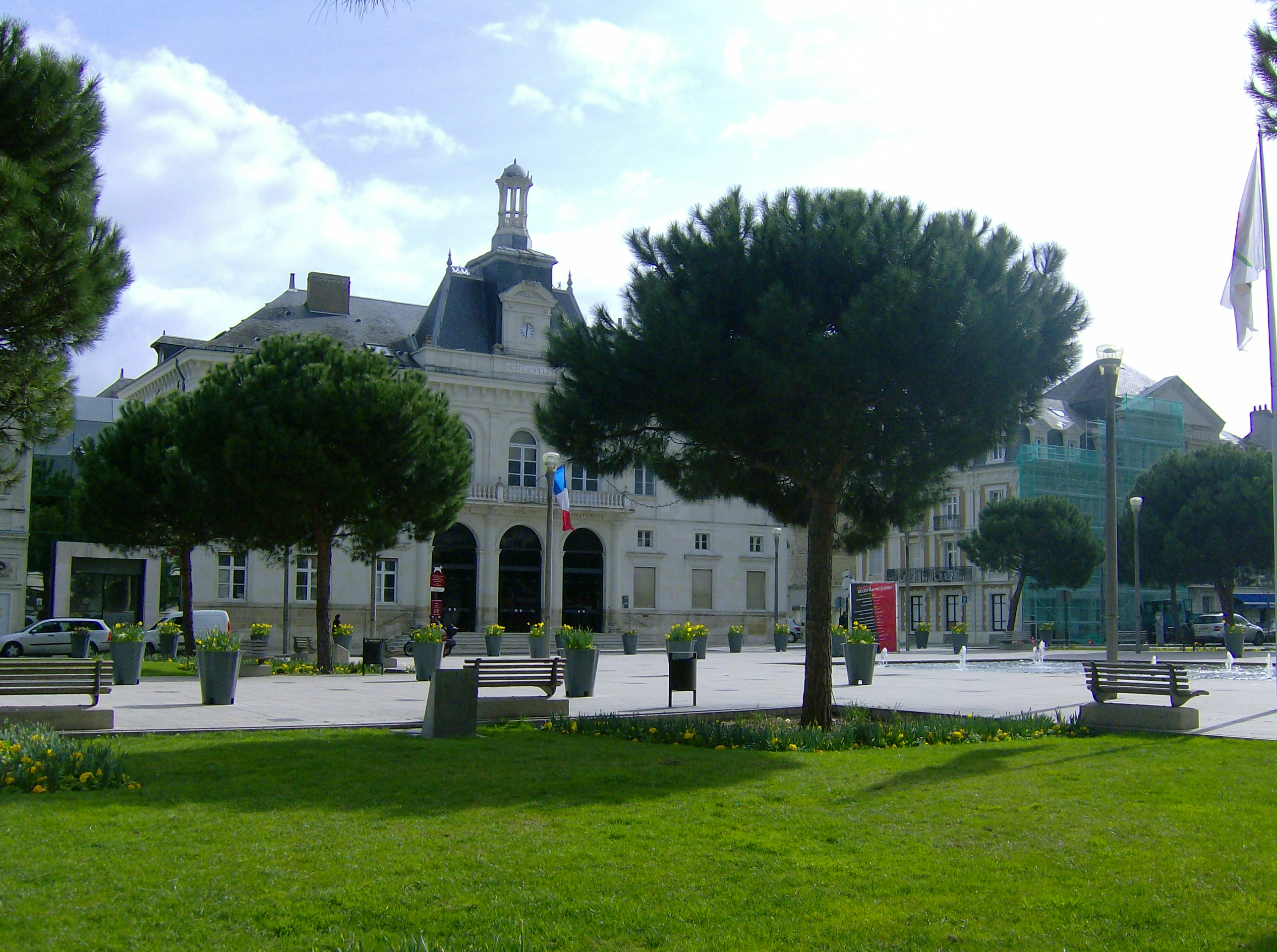
The Hôtel de Ville

Châtellerault was an important stronghold on the northern march of Poitou, established by the Count of Poitiers to secure his borders in the early 10th century. The count's local representative, the Vicomte de Châtellerault was established as a hereditary appointment by the time of Airaud who was probably a kinsman of the counts of Auvergne and dukes of Aquitaine; his heirs were vicomtes (viscounts) until the mid-11th century.

The daughter of Aymeric I, Ænor of Châtellerault (c. 1103 – c. 1130), whose mother had been the "mistress" in the new courtly love poetry of the troubadour lord William, sixth Count of Poitiers and ninth Duke of Aquitaine, who lodged in his tower the "Dangereuse de Châtellerault", married his son, William X of Aquitaine, and was mother of Eleanor of Aquitaine.

The title, Vicomte de Châtellerault, passed in turn to each of three great French noble families: La Rochefoucauld, Lusignan and, from the thirteenth century until the French Revolution, to the family of Harcourt.

However, in return for services offered to the Crowns of Scotland and France, the title of Duc de Châtellerault (1548) was presented to James Hamilton, 2nd Earl of Arran, Chief of the Name, and regent of Scotland during the infancy of Mary, Queen of Scots, and of France. This title, though now without any benefices, remains in contention between the heir male and the heir general of Arran, respectively the Duke of Abercorn and the Duke of Hamilton. (See Chatelherault Country Park, Lanarkshire.)

The Hôtel de Ville was completed in 1850.

== Population ==
Historical population

Year	Pop.	±% p.a.
1793	7,725	—
1800	8,193	+0.84%
1806	8,970	+1.52%
1821	9,183	+0.16%
1831	9,437	+0.27%
1836	9,695	+0.54%
1841	9,636	−0.12%
1846	11,584	+3.75%
1851	12,433	+1.42%
1856	14,084	+2.53%
1861	14,210	+0.18%
1866	14,278	+0.10%
1872	15,606	+1.49%
1876	18,053	+3.71%
1881	18,280	+0.25%
1886	17,402	−0.98%
1891	22,522	+5.29%
1896	20,014	−2.33%
1901	20,801	+0.77%

Year	Pop.	±% p.a.
1906	18,180	−2.66%
1911	18,260	+0.09%
1921	17,600	−0.37%
1926	17,720	+0.14%
1931	17,704	−0.02%
1936	19,369	+1.81%
1946	22,809	+1.65%
1954	23,583	+0.42%
1962	27,079	+1.74%
1968	35,337	+4.54%
1975	37,080	+0.69%
1982	35,838	−0.49%
1990	34,678	−0.41%
1999	34,126	−0.18%
2007	33,993	−0.05%
2012	31,537	−1.49%
2017	31,840	+0.19%
2023	31,003	−0.44%

Source: EHESS and INSEE (1968–2023)

== Economy ==
From medieval times, Châtellerault was known for its cutlery and swordmaking industry, and in 1816 the commune became a center for arms manufacture for the French government. The Manufacture d'armes de Châtellerault was one of France's four principal state-owned arms manufacturers, providing most of the infantry small arms used by the French Army and Navy. MAC was created in 1819, and operated continually until it was closed as a weapon manufacturing facility in 1968. It saw the creation in 1886, and later the mass production, of the Lebel rifle which was the main French infantry weapon used during the First World War (1914–1918). It also was the source of the first 500,000 production Model 1891 Mosin–Nagant rifles, as the Russian armament industry could not tool up quickly enough to produce them for the rearmament of the Imperial Russian Army.

The facility has now been transformed into the central repository (Centre des Archives de l'Armement et du Personnel) of all the French military archives related to armament matters. Archived and declassified MAC records are open to bona fide scholars and researchers upon written request.

== Personalities ==
=== Births ===
Châtellerault was the birthplace of:

- Aénor de Châtellerault (1103–1130), Duchess of Aquitaine
- Clément Janequin (c. 1485–1558), composer of the Renaissance
- Jean Daillé (1594–1670), French Huguenot and Calvinist theologian
- Charles Sabourin (1849–1920), pulmonologist
- Gilbert Chinard (1881–1972), author, historian
- Rodolphe Salis (1851–1897), creator, host and owner of Le Chat Noir ("The Black Cat")
- Marie-Louise Carven (1909–2015), fashion designer, recipient of the highest French civilian honor, Commander of the Legion of Honor
- Bernard Panafieu (born 1931), archbishop of Marseille and Cardinal Priest of the Roman Catholic Church
- Benoît Cauet (born 1969), former footballer
- Sylvain Chavanel (born 1979) and Sébastien Chavanel (born 1981), professional cyclists

=== Notable residents ===
- Édith Cresson (born 1934), French politician
- Jean-Pierre Thiollet (born 1956), writer

== Twin towns – sister cities ==
Châtellerault is twinned with:

- Velbert, Germany, since 1965
- Kaya, Burkina Faso, since 1976
- Corby, England, United Kingdom, since 1979
- Bouctouche, Kent County, New Brunswick, Canada, since 1984
- Castellón de la Plana, Spain, since 1987
- Hamilton, Scotland, United Kingdom, since 1993
- Piła, Poland, since 1994

== See also ==
- Poitevin language
- Communes of the Vienne department
