= Gallo-Roman Museum =

Gallo-Roman Museum may refer to:

- Gallo-Roman Museum, Lyon in Lyon, France
- Gallo-Roman Museum, Tongeren in Tongeren, Belgium
- Vesunna Gallo-Roman Museum in Perigueux, France

== See also ==
- Gallo-Roman culture
