= Périgueux =

Prefecture of Dordogne, Nouvelle-Aquitaine

Périgueux Peireguers / Periguers (Occitan)
- Prefecture and commune
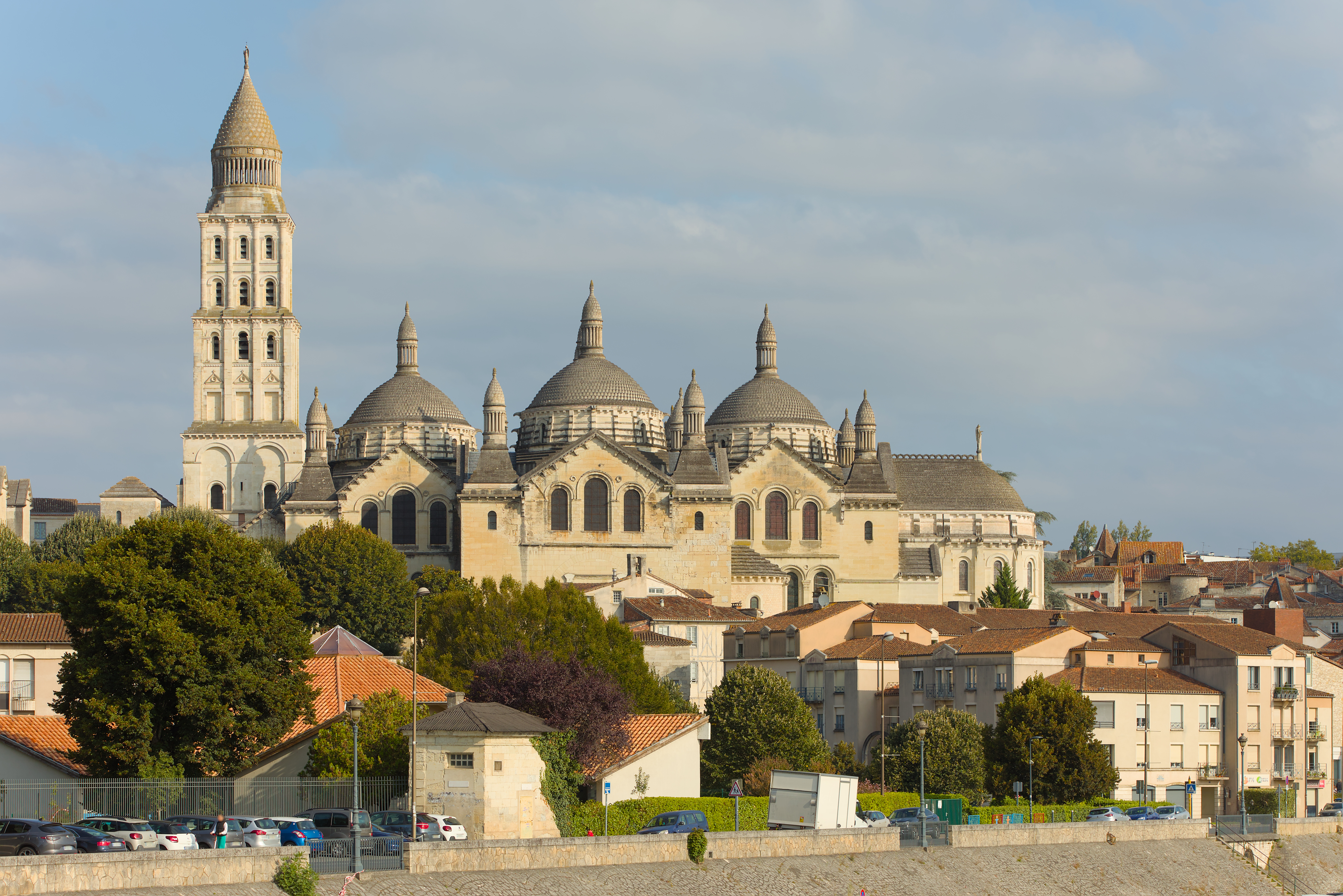
- View of the city centre and St Front's cathedral from the east bank of river Isle

- Coat of arms
- Location of Périgueux
- Location within France Location within Nouvelle-Aquitaine
- Coordinates: 45°11′34″N 0°43′18″E
- Country: France
- Region: Nouvelle-Aquitaine
- Department: Dordogne
- Arrondissement: Périgueux
- Canton: Périgueux-1 and 2
- Intercommunality: Le Grand Périgueux

Government
  - Mayor (2020–2026): Delphine Labails
- Area^{1}: 9.82 km^{2} (3.79 sq mi)
  - Urban: 154.4 km^{2} (59.6 sq mi)
  - Metro: 1,061 km^{2} (410 sq mi)
- Elevation: 101 m (331 ft)
- Highest elevation: 189 m (620 ft)
- Lowest elevation: 75 m (246 ft)
- Population (2023): 29,055
  - Density: 2,960/km^{2} (7,660/sq mi)
  - Urban (2022): 66,044
  - Urban density: 427.7/km^{2} (1,108/sq mi)
  - Metro (2022): 114,349
  - Metro density: 107.8/km^{2} (279.1/sq mi)
- Time zone: UTC+01:00 (CET)
  - Summer (DST): UTC+02:00 (CEST)
- INSEE/Postal code: 24322 /24000
- ^{1} French Land Register data, which excludes lakes, ponds, glaciers > 1 km^{2} (0.386 sq mi or 247 acres) and river estuaries.

Périgueux (/ˌpɛrɪˈɡɜː/, French: [peʁiɡø]; Occitan: Peireguers [pejɾeˈɣɥes, pejɾeˈɡœː] or Periguers [peɾiˈɣɥes, peɾiˈɡœː]) (Note: Transcriptions represent both Languedocien and Limousin pronunciation.) is a commune in the Dordogne department, in the administrative region of Nouvelle-Aquitaine, southwestern France.

Périgueux is the prefecture of Dordogne, and was the capital city of the historic region of Périgord. It is also the seat of a Roman Catholic diocese.

== History ==
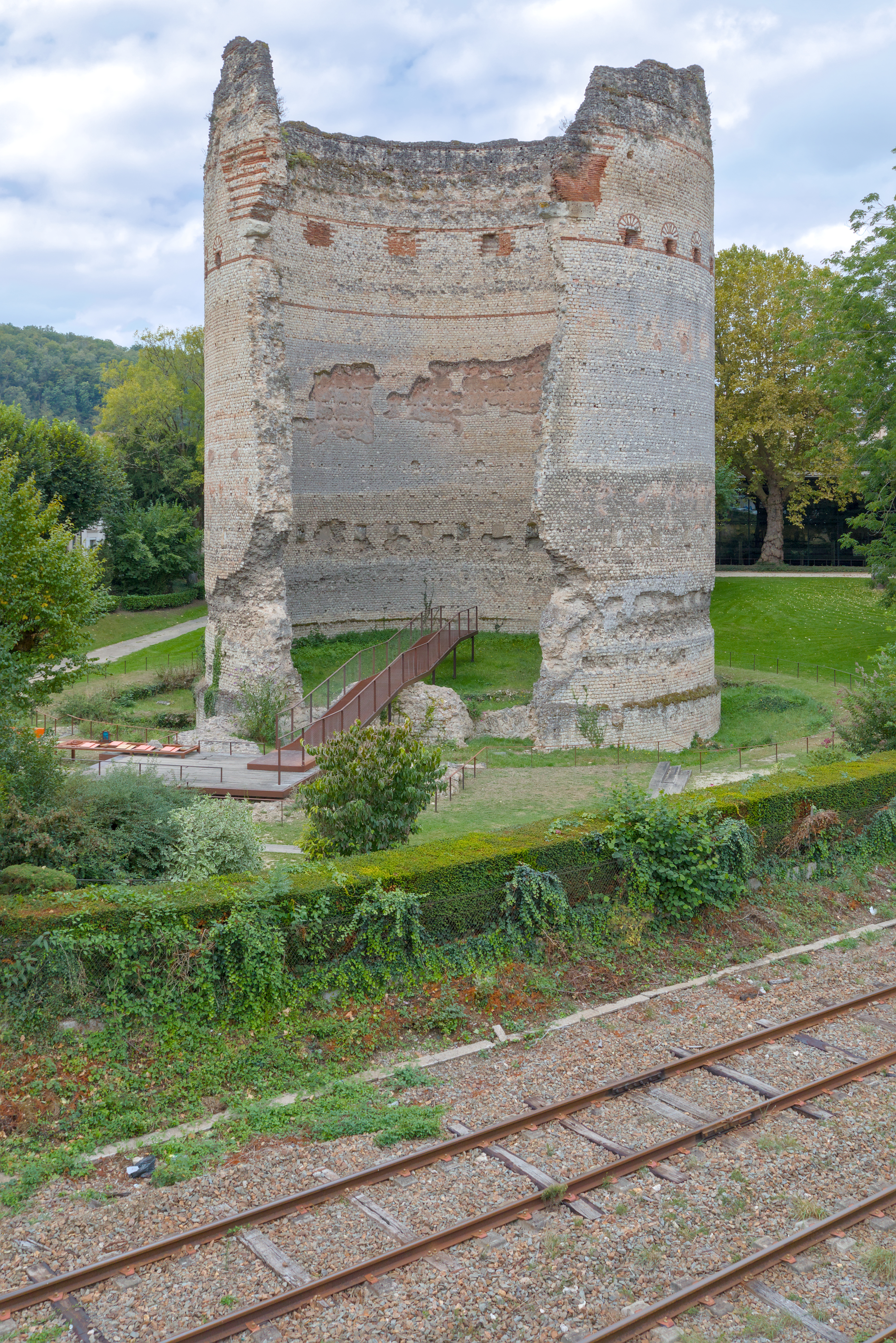
Roman Tower of Vesunna, bordered since the 19th century by a railway.

The name Périgueux comes from Petrocorii, a Latinization of Celtic words meaning "the four tribes" – the Gallic people that held the area before the Roman conquest. Périgueux was their capital city. In 200 BC, the Petrocorii came from the north and settled at Périgueux and established an encampment at La Boissière. After the Roman invasion, they left this post and established themselves on the plain of L'Isle, and the town of Vesunna was created. This Roman city was eventually embellished with amenities such as temples, baths, amphitheatres, and a forum. At the end of the third century AD, the Roman city was surrounded by ramparts, and the town took the name of Civitas Petrocoriorum.

In the 10th century, Le Puy-Saint-Front was constructed around an abbey next to the old Gallo-Roman city. It was organised into a municipality around 1182.

During the year 1940, many Jews from Alsace and Alsatians were evacuated to Périgueux.

Simone Mareuil (a lead actress from the surrealist film Un Chien Andalou) committed self-immolation on 24 October 1954 by dousing herself in gasoline and burning herself to death in a public square in Périgueux.

== Geography ==
The Isle river flows through Périgueux.

== Demographics ==
In 2022, 29,876 people lived in the town, while its metropolitan area had a population of 114,349.

Historical population

Year	Pop.	±% p.a.
1793	9,898	—
1800	5,733	−7.50%
1806	6,306	+1.60%
1821	8,452	+1.97%
1831	8,956	+0.58%
1836	11,576	+5.27%
1841	12,187	+1.03%
1846	11,455	−1.23%
1851	13,547	+3.41%
1856	16,291	+3.76%
1861	19,140	+3.28%
1866	19,633	+0.51%
1872	19,956	+0.27%
1876	24,169	+4.91%
1881	25,969	+1.45%
1886	29,611	+2.66%
1891	31,439	+1.21%
1896	31,313	−0.08%
1901	31,976	+0.42%

Year	Pop.	±% p.a.
1906	31,361	−0.39%
1911	33,548	+1.36%
1921	33,144	−0.12%
1926	33,389	+0.15%
1931	33,988	+0.36%
1936	37,615	+2.05%
1946	40,865	+0.83%
1954	40,785	−0.02%
1962	38,529	−0.71%
1968	37,450	−0.47%
1975	35,120	−0.91%
1982	32,916	−0.92%
1990	30,280	−1.04%
1999	30,193	−0.03%
2007	29,416	−0.33%
2012	29,906	+0.33%
2017	29,966	+0.04%
2023	29,055	−0.51%

Source: EHESS and INSEE (1968–2023)

== Sights ==
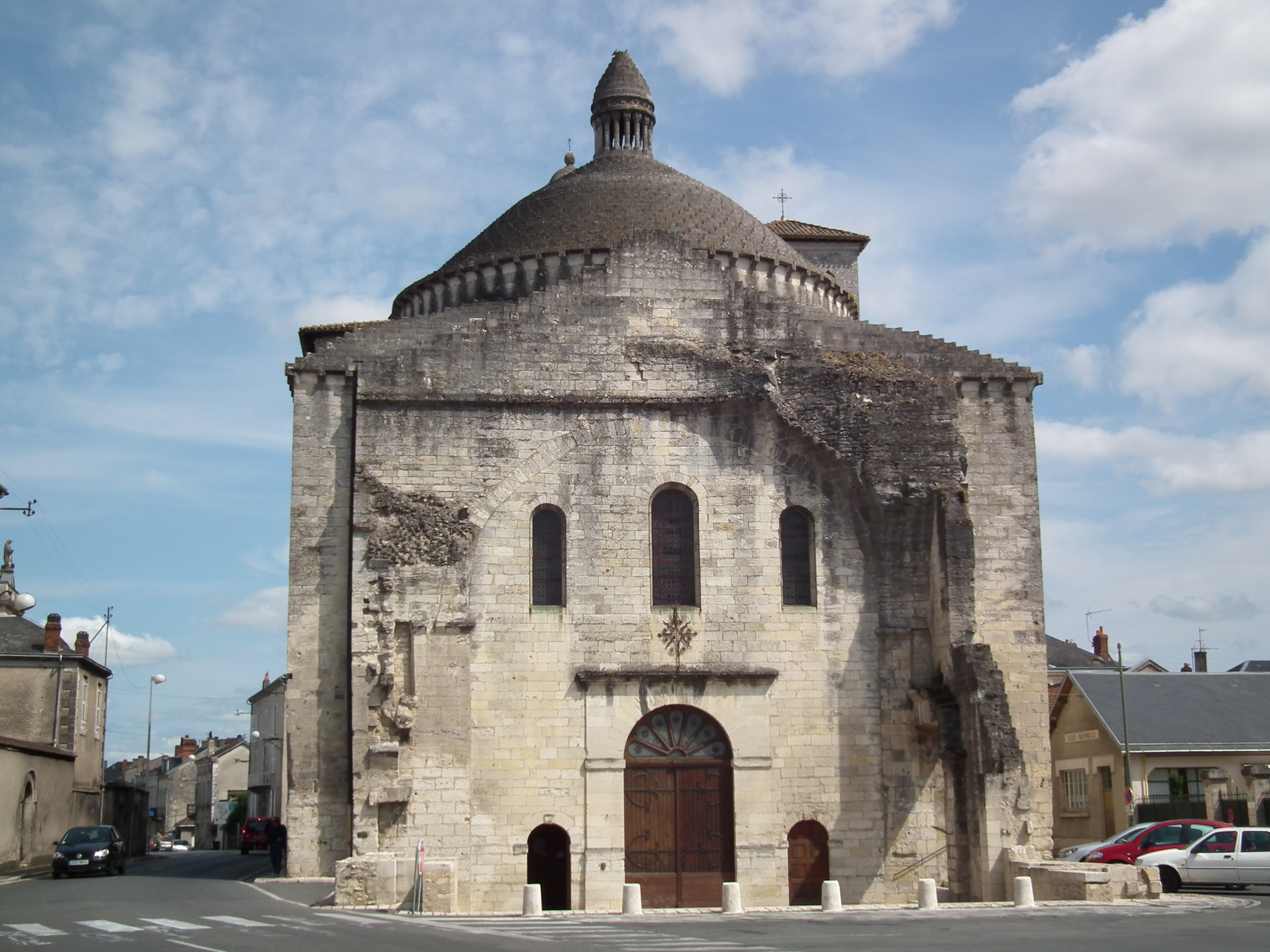
Saint-Étienne Church

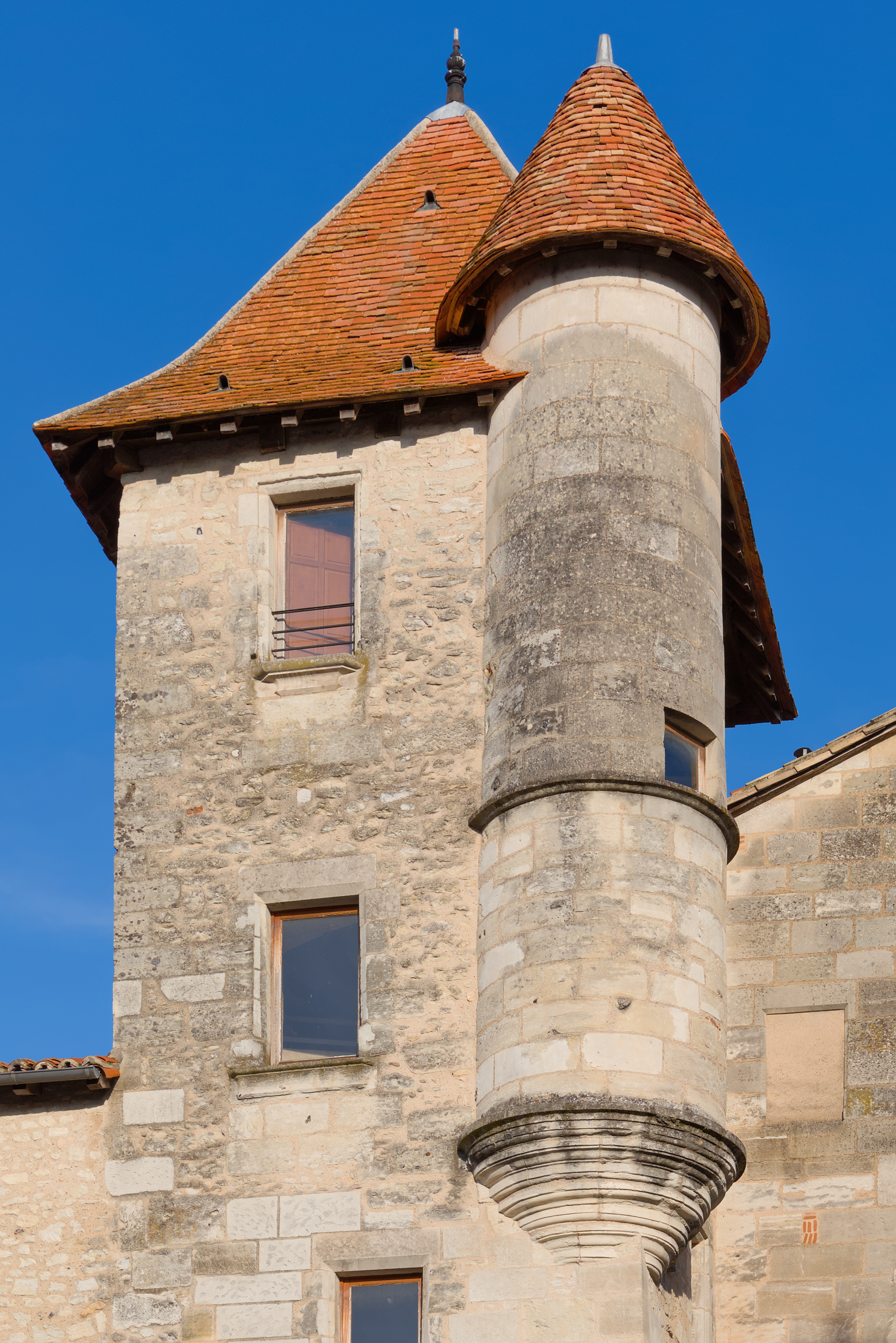
Tower and turret of Renaissance Maison du Pâtissier (also known as Maison Tenant or Maison Francony)

Sights include: the remains of a Roman amphitheatre (known locally as the arènes romaines) the centre of which has been turned into a green park with a water fountain; the remains of a temple of the Gallic goddess "Vesunna"; and a luxurious Roman villa, called the "Domus of Vesunna", built around a garden courtyard surrounded by a colonnaded peristyle now housed in the Vesunna Gallo-Roman Museum.

=== Cathedral ===
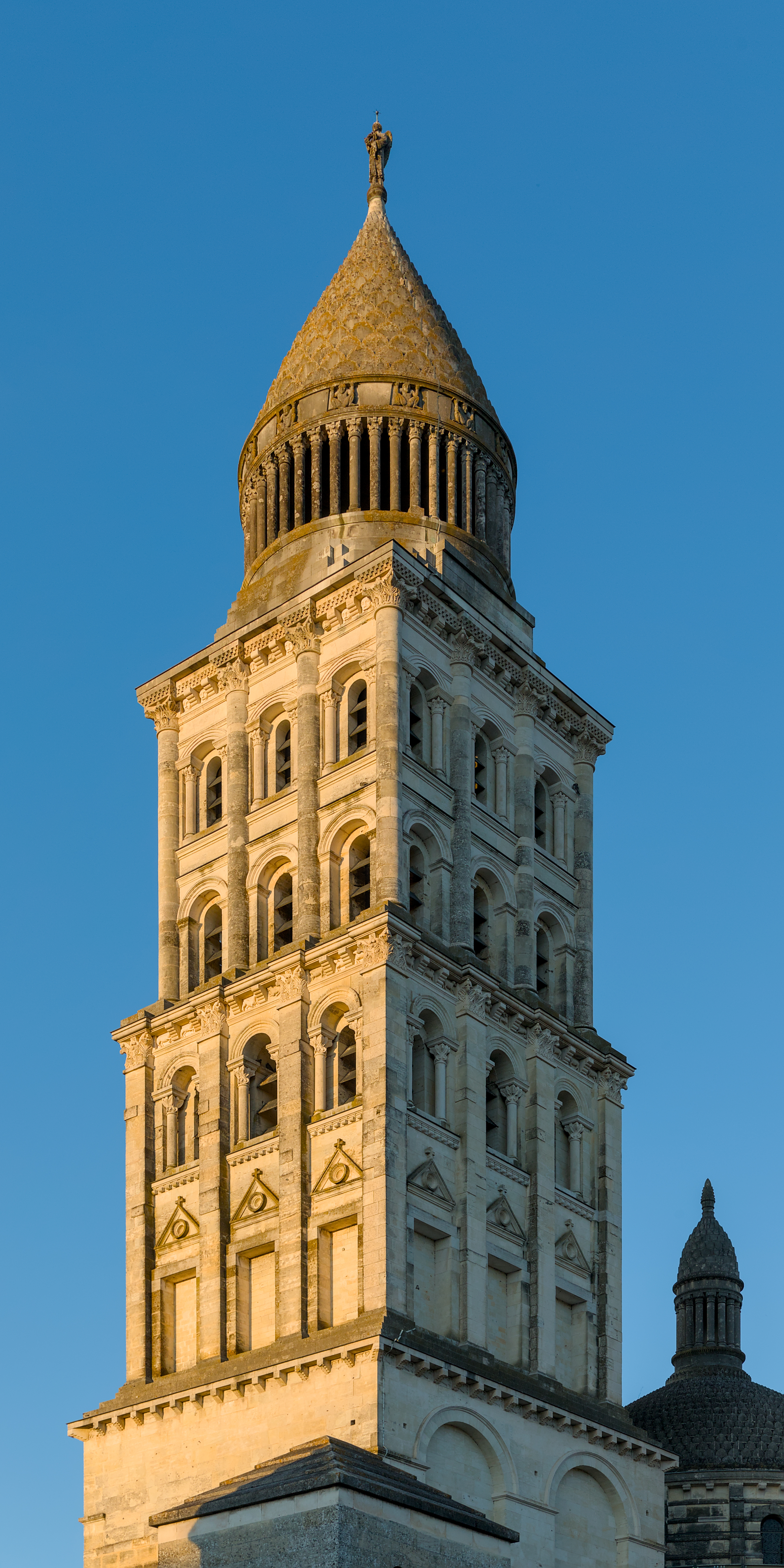
The bell tower of St Front's cathedral

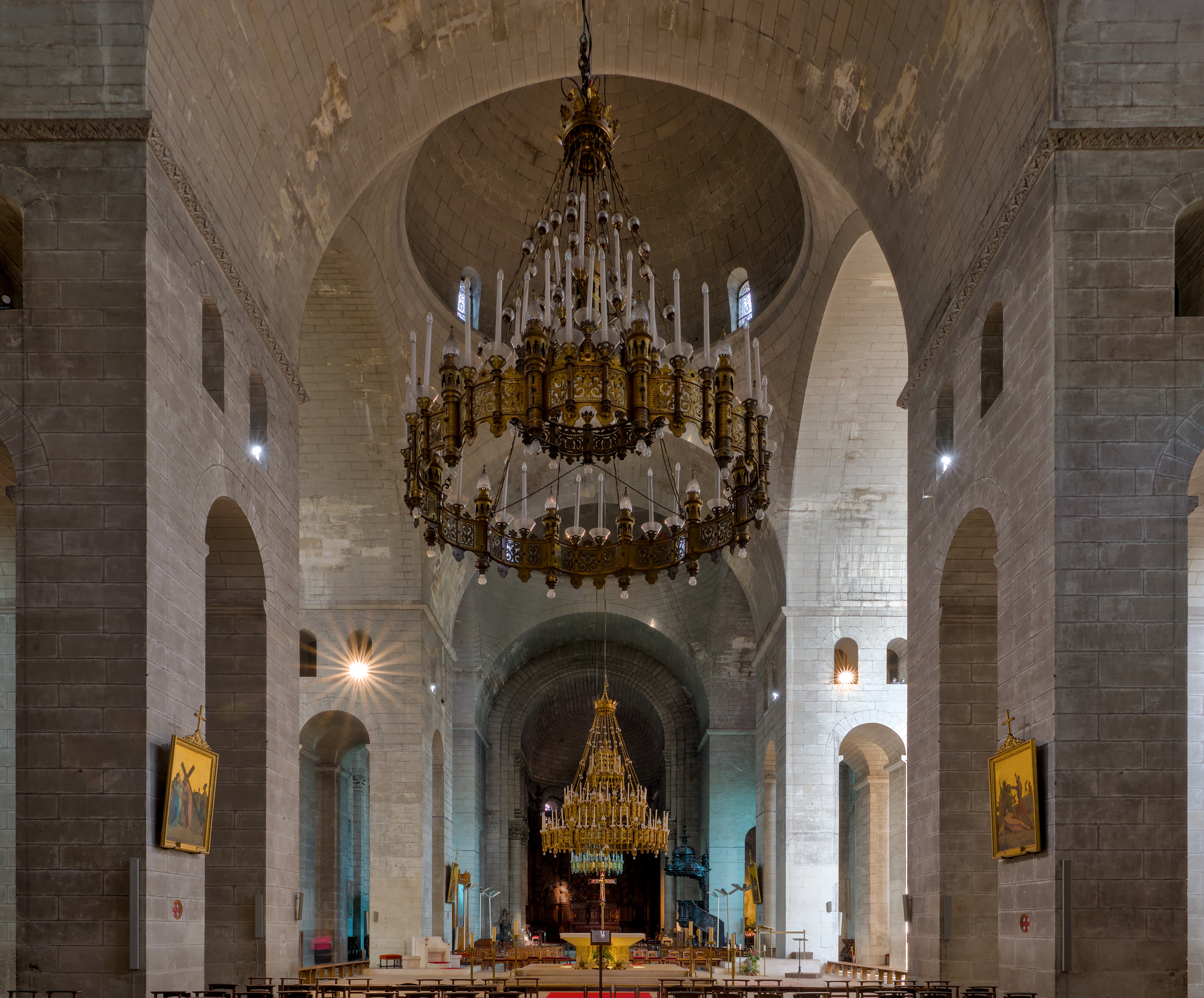
St Front's cathedral, inside

The cathedral of St Front was built after 1120 and restored in the 19th century.

The history of the church of St Front of Périgueux has given rise to numerous discussions between archaeologists. Félix de Verneihl claims that St Front's was a copy of St Mark's Basilica in Venice; Quicherat, that it was copied from the church of the Holy Apostles of Constantinople. M. Brutails is of the opinion that even if the style of St Front's reveals an imitation of Oriental art, the construction differs altogether from Byzantine methods. The dates 984–1047, often given for the erection of St Front's, he considers too early; he thinks that the present church of St Front was built about 1120–1173, in imitation of a foreign monument by a native local school of architecture which erected the other domed buildings in the south-west of France.

The local architect, Paul Abadie (1812–1884), was responsible for radical changes to St Front's which are no longer appreciated by architects or local residents who prefer the purer Romanesque church of Saint-Étienne de la Cité, the former Cathedral of Périgueux.

The cathedral is part of the World Heritage Sites of the Routes of Santiago de Compostela in France.

=== Hôtel de Ville ===
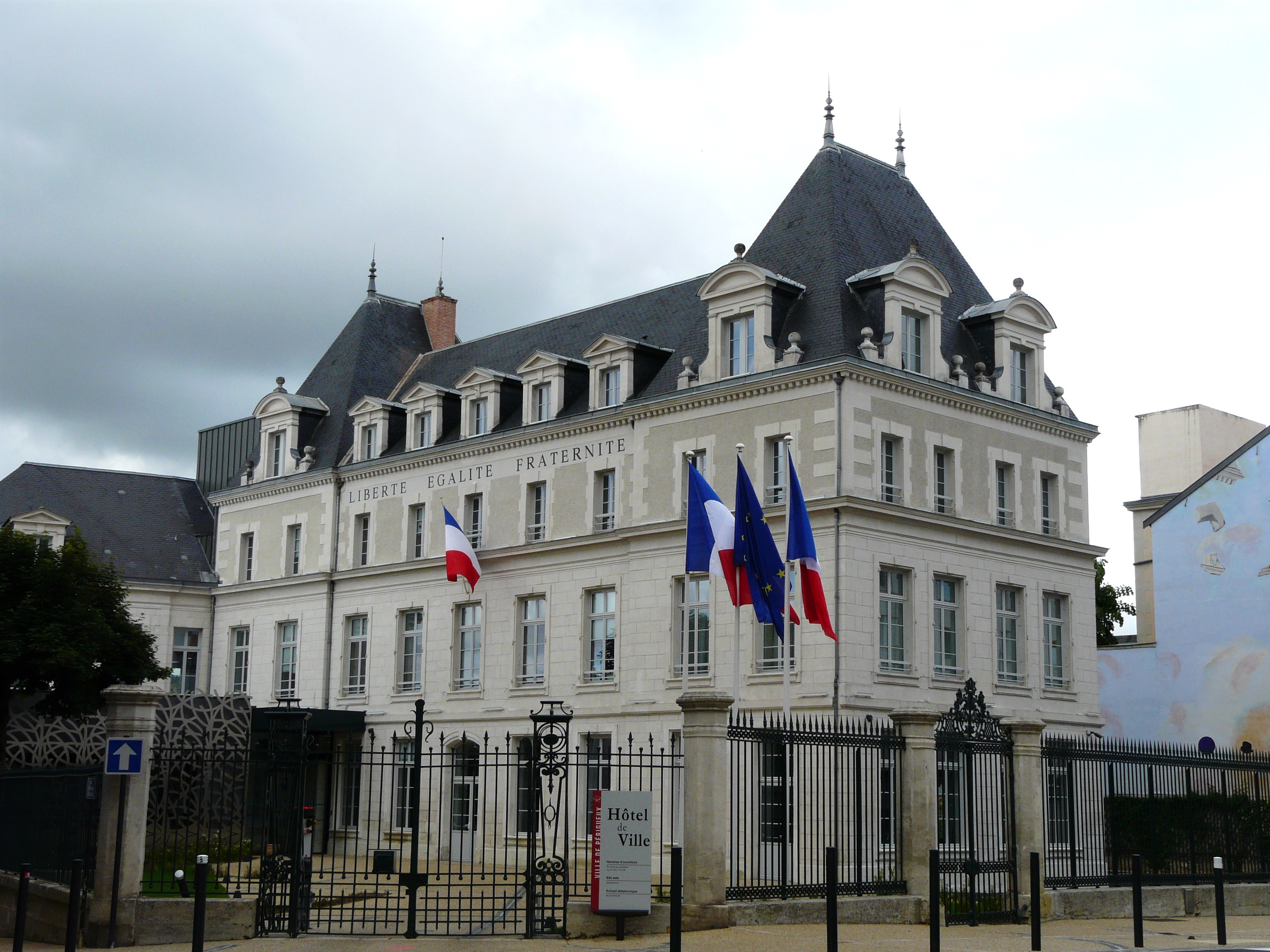
The Hôtel de Ville

The Hôtel de Ville was commissioned as a private residence and completed in 1790.

== Transport ==
Périgueux railway station offers connections to Limoges, Bordeaux, Brive-la-Gaillarde, and other regional destinations. The trains are operated by train company SNCF.

Périgueux has an airport. Périgueux Bassillac Airport is located 8 km (5 mi) east-northeast of town. A public service airport, it primarily accommodates business flights, medical flights, military flights, official flights, training and proficiency flights (aircraft and ULMs), as well as leisure flights operated by based aeroclubs. There are no scheduled passenger flights to and from the Périgueux Bassillac Airport.

The airports nearest to Périgueux with scheduled flights are Bergerac Dordogne Périgord Airport which is located 51 km (32 mi) south, Brive–Souillac Airport which is located 88 km (55 mi) south east and Bordeaux-Mérignac Airport which is located 144 km (89 mi) south west of Périgueux.

== Climate ==
Périgueux has an oceanic climate (Köppen Cfb) with warm to hot summers combined with cool to mild winters. Périgueux has a mild climate for its latitude and inland position due to the significant Gulf Stream influence on the Bay of Biscay to its west. The resulting maritime air warms winters, while at the same time it is far enough inland to cause relatively warm summers on average.

Climate data for Périgueux (1981–2010 normals; extremes 1973–2017)
Month	Jan	Feb	Mar	Apr	May	Jun	Jul	Aug	Sep	Oct	Nov	Dec	Year
Record high °C (°F)	18.5 (65.3)	23.1 (73.6)	27.6 (81.7)	29.3 (84.7)	32.0 (89.6)	38.1 (100.6)	38.0 (100.4)	40.0 (104.0)	36.1 (97.0)	31.1 (88.0)	23.9 (75.0)	19.1 (66.4)	40.0 (104.0)
Mean daily maximum °C (°F)	8.9 (48.0)	10.4 (50.7)	14.4 (57.9)	16.9 (62.4)	20.8 (69.4)	24.0 (75.2)	27.0 (80.6)	27.2 (81.0)	24.0 (75.2)	18.8 (65.8)	12.9 (55.2)	9.7 (49.5)	17.7 (63.9)
Daily mean °C (°F)	5.1 (41.2)	5.9 (42.6)	8.9 (48.0)	11.2 (52.2)	15.0 (59.0)	18.1 (64.6)	20.6 (69.1)	20.5 (68.9)	17.4 (63.3)	13.6 (56.5)	8.7 (47.7)	5.6 (42.1)	12.4 (54.3)
Mean daily minimum °C (°F)	1.1 (34.0)	1.4 (34.5)	3.4 (38.1)	5.5 (41.9)	9.2 (48.6)	12.2 (54.0)	14.3 (57.7)	13.8 (56.8)	10.7 (51.3)	8.3 (46.9)	4.5 (40.1)	1.6 (34.9)	7.0 (44.6)
Record low °C (°F)	−17.5 (0.5)	−13.7 (7.3)	−15.1 (4.8)	−5.0 (23.0)	−2.0 (28.4)	1.0 (33.8)	5.0 (41.0)	1.8 (35.2)	0.0 (32.0)	−3.3 (26.1)	−9.2 (15.4)	−12.0 (10.4)	−17.5 (0.5)
Average precipitation mm (inches)	83.9 (3.30)	65.3 (2.57)	70.4 (2.77)	81.1 (3.19)	81.2 (3.20)	73.8 (2.91)	71.4 (2.81)	65.3 (2.57)	53.9 (2.12)	74.3 (2.93)	81.0 (3.19)	68.9 (2.71)	874.9 (34.44)
Average precipitation days	12.4	10.6	11.1	10.6	11.2	9.3	6.4	6.0	6.5	9.5	11.7	10.5	115.8
Source 1: Météo Climat
Source 2: Météo Climat

== Sports ==
- The CA Périgueux is a rugby union club founded in 1901.
- The Boulazac Basket Dordogne, commonly known as BBD, originally played in Périgueux under the name USPB, but the construction of a multi-sports arena in Boulazac in 1992 prompted the club's management to relocate to the suburbs.

== Personalities ==
Périgueux was the birthplace of:

- Georges Bégué (1911–1993), engineer and agent in the Special Operations Executive
- Francine Benoît (1894–1990), composer, music critic and teacher, who gained Portuguese citizenship in 1929.
- William Joseph Chaminade (1761–1850), founder of the Society of Mary (Marianists) and the Daughters of Mary Immaculate
- Jean Clédat (1871–1943), Egyptologist, archaeologist, and philologist.
- Pierre Daumesnil (1776–1832), general of the First Empire.
- Nicole Duclos (1947–), athlete.
- Julien Dupuy (1983–), rugby union player.
- Pierre-Paul Grassé (1895–1985), zoologist
- Ketty Kerviel (1916–2009), film actress
- Patrick Ollier (1944–), politician, President of the National Assembly in 2007.
- Rachilde (1860–1953), writer associated with the Decadent and Symbolist movements.
- René Thomas (1886–1975), racing driver, winner of the Indianapolis 500 in 1914.

== International relations ==
Périgueux is twinned with:

- Amberg, Germany
- flagicon CAN Rivière-du-Loup, QC, Canada

== See also ==
- Communes of the Dordogne department
- Périgord
- Coderc Plaza
- History of Périgueux
- Plumancy Square
- Carnaval de Périgueux
- Laure-Gatet High School
- Roman Road from Saintes to Périgueux
- Pierre-Fanlac Media Library
