= Plumancy Square =

Square in Périgueux, France

Coordinates: 45.1869°N 0.7145°E

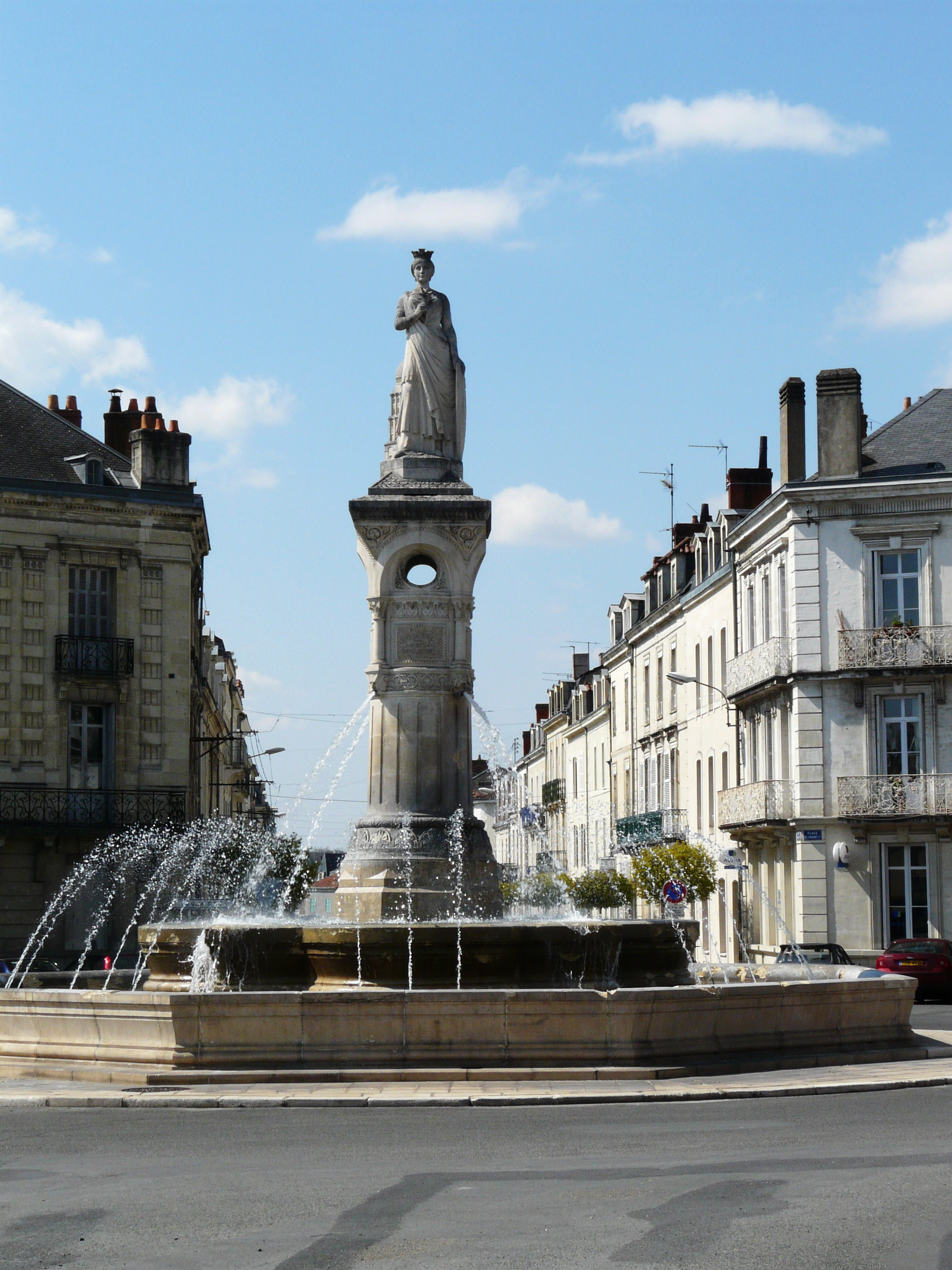
The Plumancy Square in 2010.

Plumancy Square (in French: place Plumancy) is a town square, situated in Périgueux (France). It is a traffic circle.

== History ==
The military sub-bursar Jean Plumancy (1788-1860) indicates in his will that he entrusts his fortune in Périgueux, his home town. After protest of the heirs and agreement of the city hall, the legacy is officially validated by imperial decree on March 2, 1861. By way of gratitude, the city hall gives then its name in 1866 to this square previously called "round square St.-Martin" when it appears to the 19th century.
