= Tower of Vesunna =

Gallo-Roman temple vestige

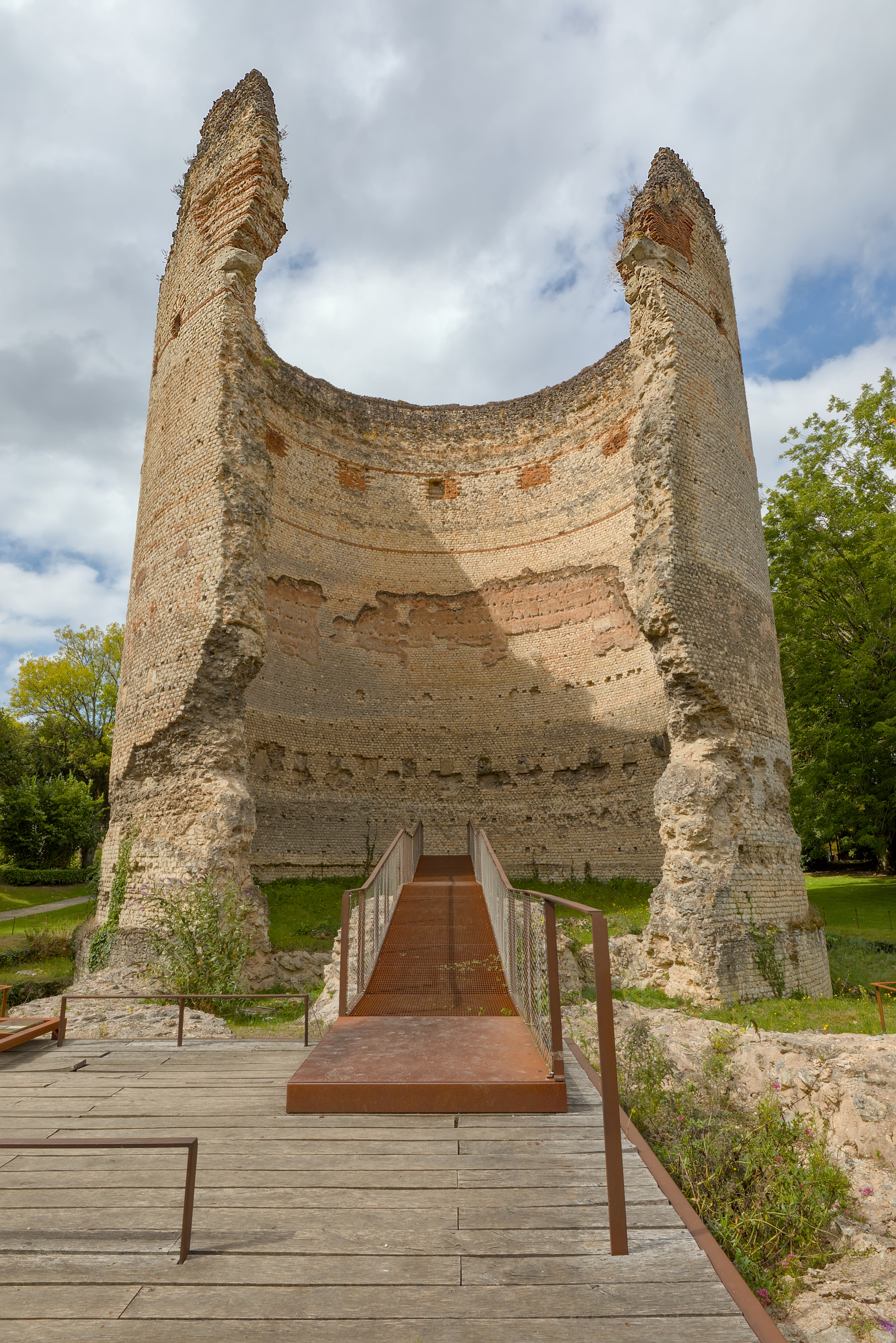
- The Tower of Vesunna and its breach, East side.

- Location within France
- 45°10′46″N 0°42′52″E
- Type: Fanum (Romano-Celtic Temple)
- Periods: Classical Antiquity
- Cultures: Petrocorii, Gallo-Roman
- Location: Périgueux, Périgord, Dordogne
- Region: Nouvelle-Aquitaine

History
- Built: 1st to 2nd century CE

Site notes
- Material: Brick and limestone
- Elevation: 90 m (300 ft)
- Height: 24.46 m (80.2 ft)
- Diameter: 19.6 m (64 ft)
- Excavation dates: 1751, 1820, 1894, 1909
- Condition: Ruined
- Owner: Municipality
- Public access: Yes

Monument historique
- Designated: 1846

The Tower of Vesunna is the vestige of a Gallo-Roman fanum (temple) dedicated to Vesunna, a tutelary goddess of the Petrocorii. The sanctuary was built in the 1st or 2nd century. Vesunna was the Gallo-Roman name for Périgueux, in the Dordogne department, in the Nouvelle-Aquitaine region of France.

== Site ==
The "Tower" is the remains of a fanum's cella located in Périgord, in the center of the Dordogne department, south of Périgueux, in the district called Vésone, on the edge of the Périgueux – Brive railway line. It stands in a public garden known as Jardin de Vésone, 50 metres west of the Vesunna Gallo-Roman Museum which holds the remains of the domus of Bouquets. Its East side is now breached by a gap nearly nine meters wide.

== History ==
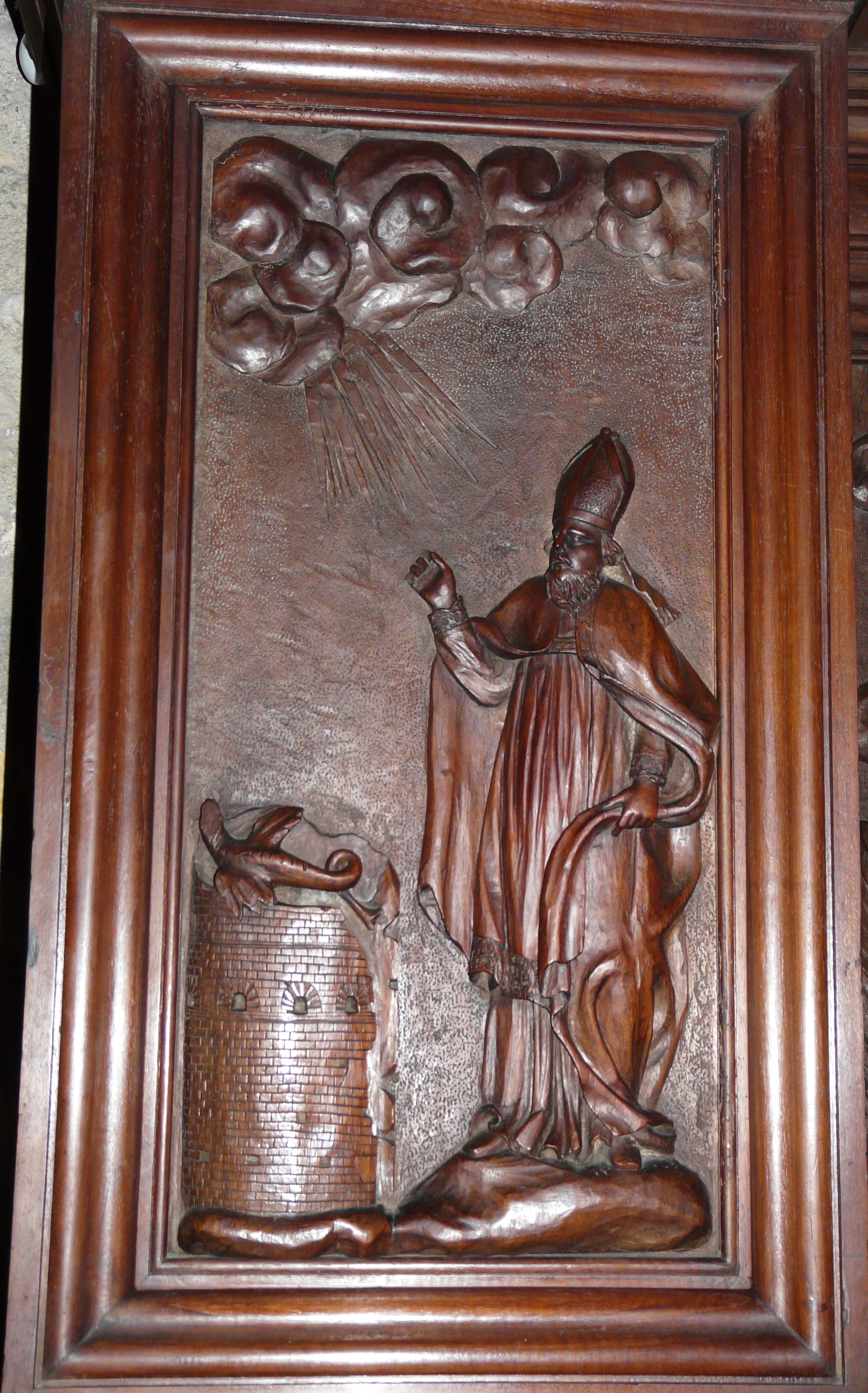
Saint Front confronting a dragon at the Tower of Vesunna (from a panel of the altarpiece at Saint-Etienne-de-la-Cité church).

[[File:Périgueux - Tour de Vésone - Proposition de restauration.jpg|thumb|180px|left|{{center|Proposal for the restoration of the Temple of Vesunna]]

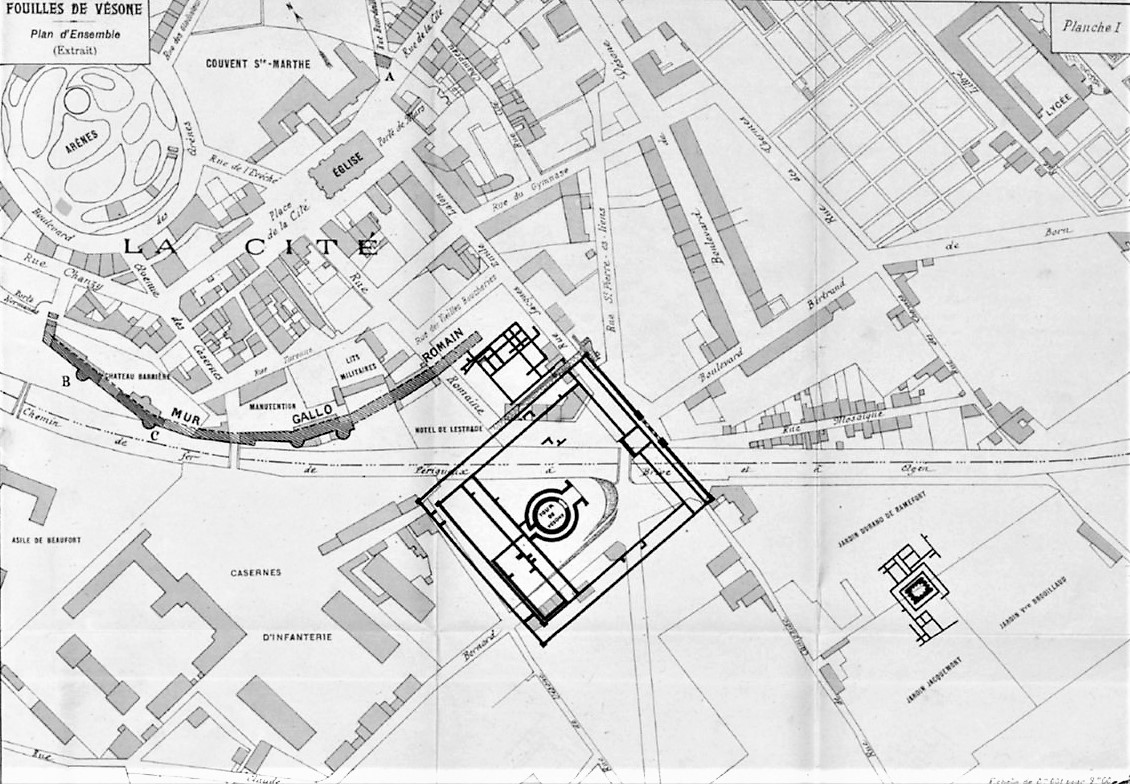
Excavations of Vésone in 1908.

The fanum is thought to have been constructed in the 2nd century or perhaps at the end of the 1st.

According to legend, Saint Front made the edifice's breach by driving out demons taking refuge in the tower with his staff. In reality, it was the result of removing large blocks that formed the entryway, causing the collapse of the portion above.

The first excavations inside the tower were undertaken by Msgr. Machéco de Prémeaux. They were halted in 1751 following a workers' panic. They were resumed by the Count de Taillefer and Joseph de Mourcin in 1820, inside and outside the tower. The excavations discovered the base of the circular wall that surrounds the tower. They recognized that the tower was the cella of a temple. This two-meter thick wall is 4.55 m from the exterior façade of the tower. Count de Taillefer assumed that it supported a peristyle (ambulatory), and proposed a reconstruction of the temple.

In 1833, the site, the property of Count Wlgrin de Taillefer, was ceded at his death to the city of Périgueux. In 1846, the tower was added to the Monument historique registry.

The construction of the Périgueux – Brive railway line, put into service in 1860, and the development of neighboring streets led to the destruction of the remains of the vast enclosure that protected the temple.

In 1894, the city of Périgueux acquired the garden surrounding the tower to install an archaeological park. Excavations were carried out which confirmed the discoveries of the Count of Taillefer: A large block construction interrupting the circular wall on the opposite side from the breach, connected to a vast set of buildings to the West of the temple. The interior of the tower was cleared to the level of the old foundation. It was during the excavations carried out by Charles Durand from 1906 to 1909 that the ambulatory of the temple was cleared along with its galleries and peristyle through which the entrance to the courtyard of the temple was made.

== Dedication ==
The Count of Taillefer supposed that this temple was dedicated to Isis, but the inscriptions preserved in the Museum of Art and Archeology of Périgord show that the temple was dedicated to the tutelary goddess of Vesunna:

Tute[lae] A[u(gustae) Vesunnae

According to Camille Jullian, "the cult of Tutela has a very Roman origin and it consists in worshipping under this name the unknown god who protects a people, a city, an individual, the deity under the supervision of whom one is placed ... Here is marked the main characteristic of the worship of the tutelae: they are deities of cities, not of peoples ... This is well indicated by the inscriptions: none is dedicated Tutelae populi, civitatis, but simply Tutelae, Tutelae augustae ... TVTELAE VESUNNAE, in the well-known inscription of Périgueux, must be translated not as 'to the tutela of Vesunna' but as, 'to the tutela, Vesunna'.

For Émile Espérandieu, this is the case with The Tower of Vesunna. We do not know who Vesunna was whom the Petrocorii had made their tutela. We may suppose she could have been a spring goddess similar to the god Nemausus, who had given his name to the city of Nîmes and to the whole of the civitate there. It may be related that A bas-relief found to the south-west of Château Barrière depicting a seated panther bears the inscription:

TVT///// A /////

== Architecture ==
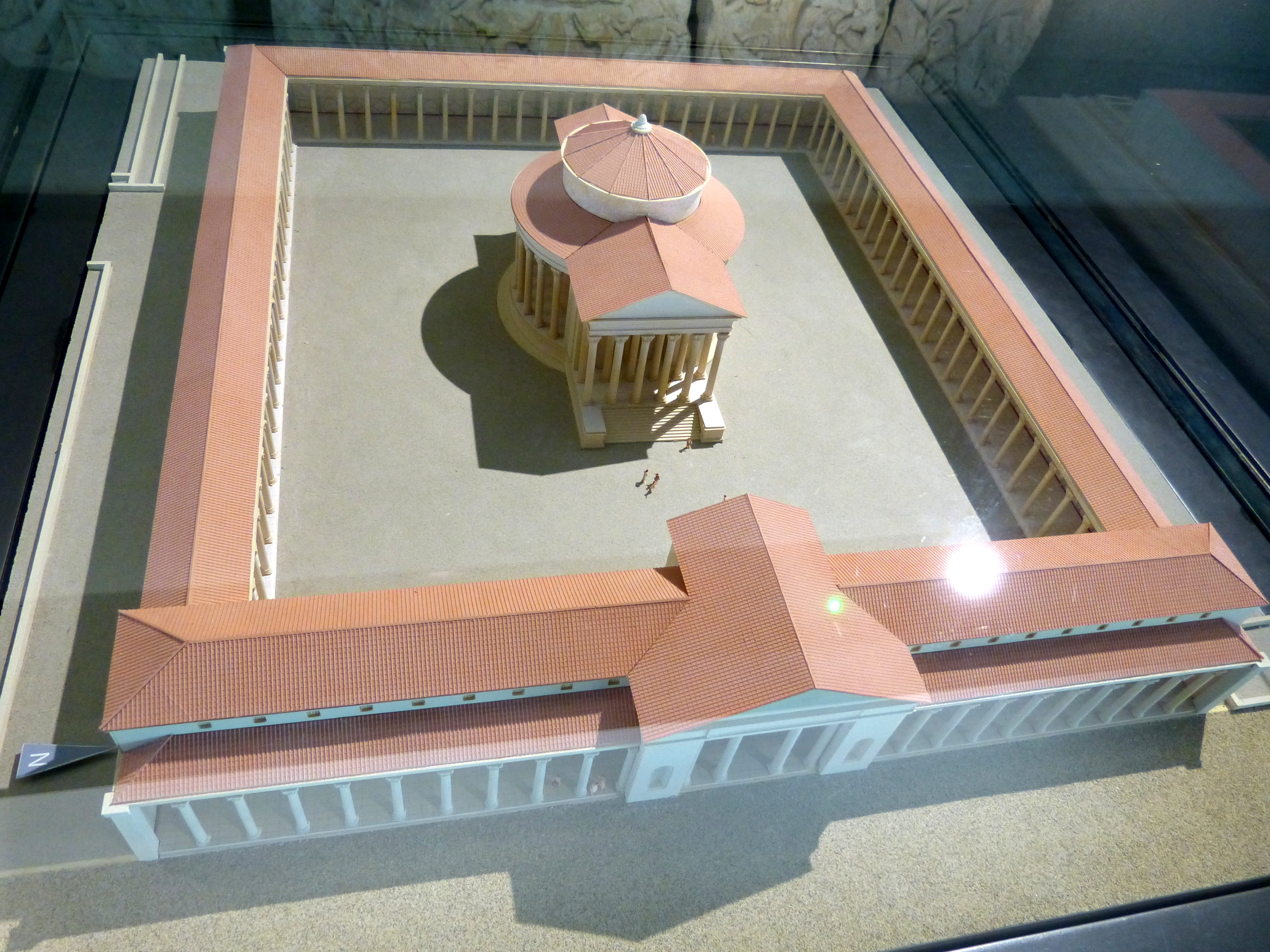
Model proposing a reconstruction of the temple (Vesunna Gallo-Roman Museum).

The architecture of the temple is a combination of two cultural influences: the Celtic fanum, with a cella surrounded by a low ambulatory or gallery, and the Roman temple model with a columned pronaos opening onto a cella. This synthesis illustrates a cultural fusion, with both Romanization and the persistence of local tradition.

The round cella is all that remains of the temple, which gives it a height of approximately 24.46 meters (27 m when measured from the foundation). It has an external diameter of 19.6 meters. The wall is 2.10 m thick at the base and 1.80 m from a visible recess of the base above the current floor. At this level, the inside diameter of the tower is 17.10 m. Originally, a wall surrounded a rectangular courtyard of more than one and a half hectares (141 m by 122) in which the fanum was centered, raised by a podium which was accessed through a rectangular pronaos with 6 columns. The cella was surrounded by a 23-column peristyle.

== Photo Gallery ==
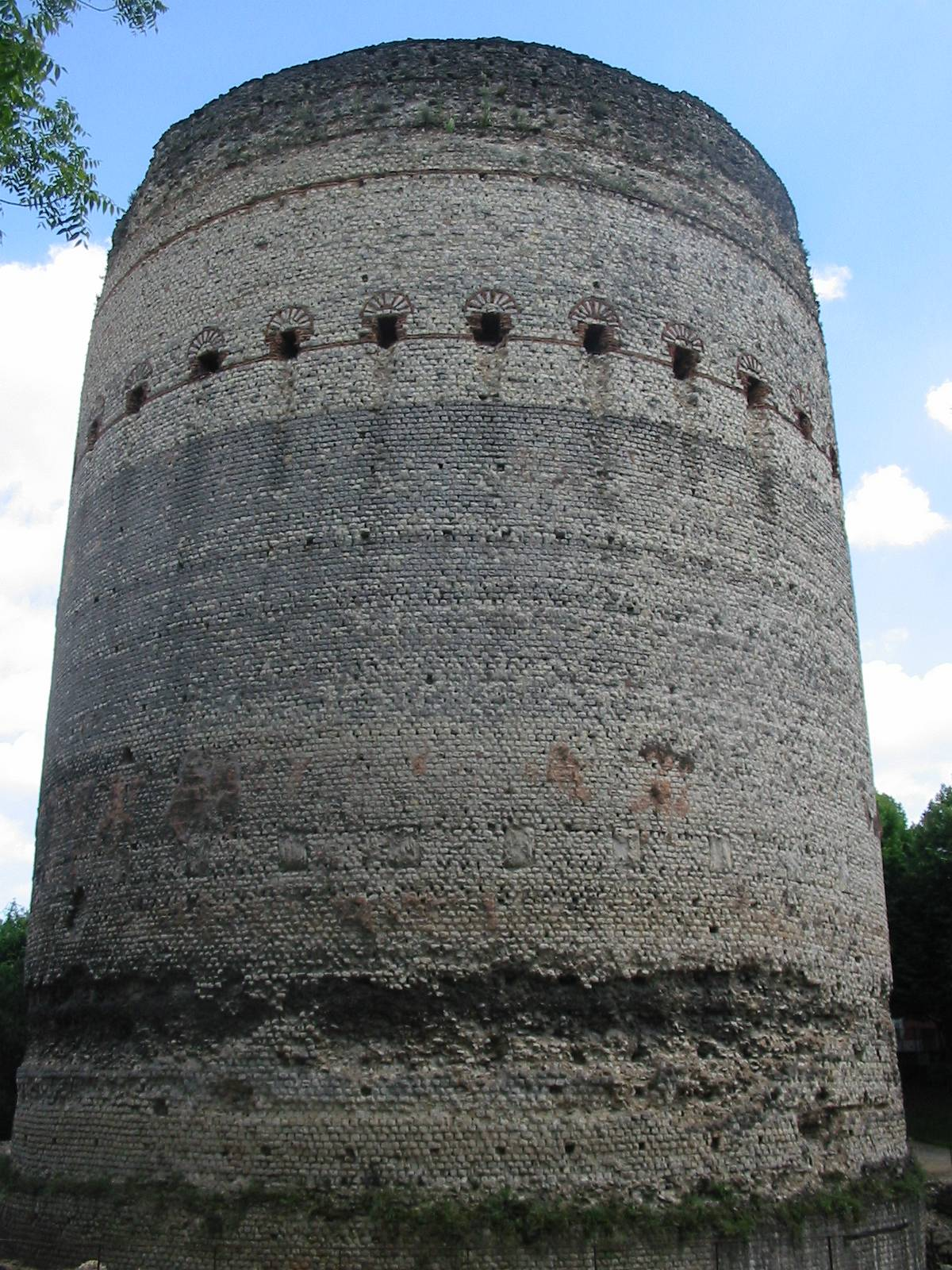
West side.

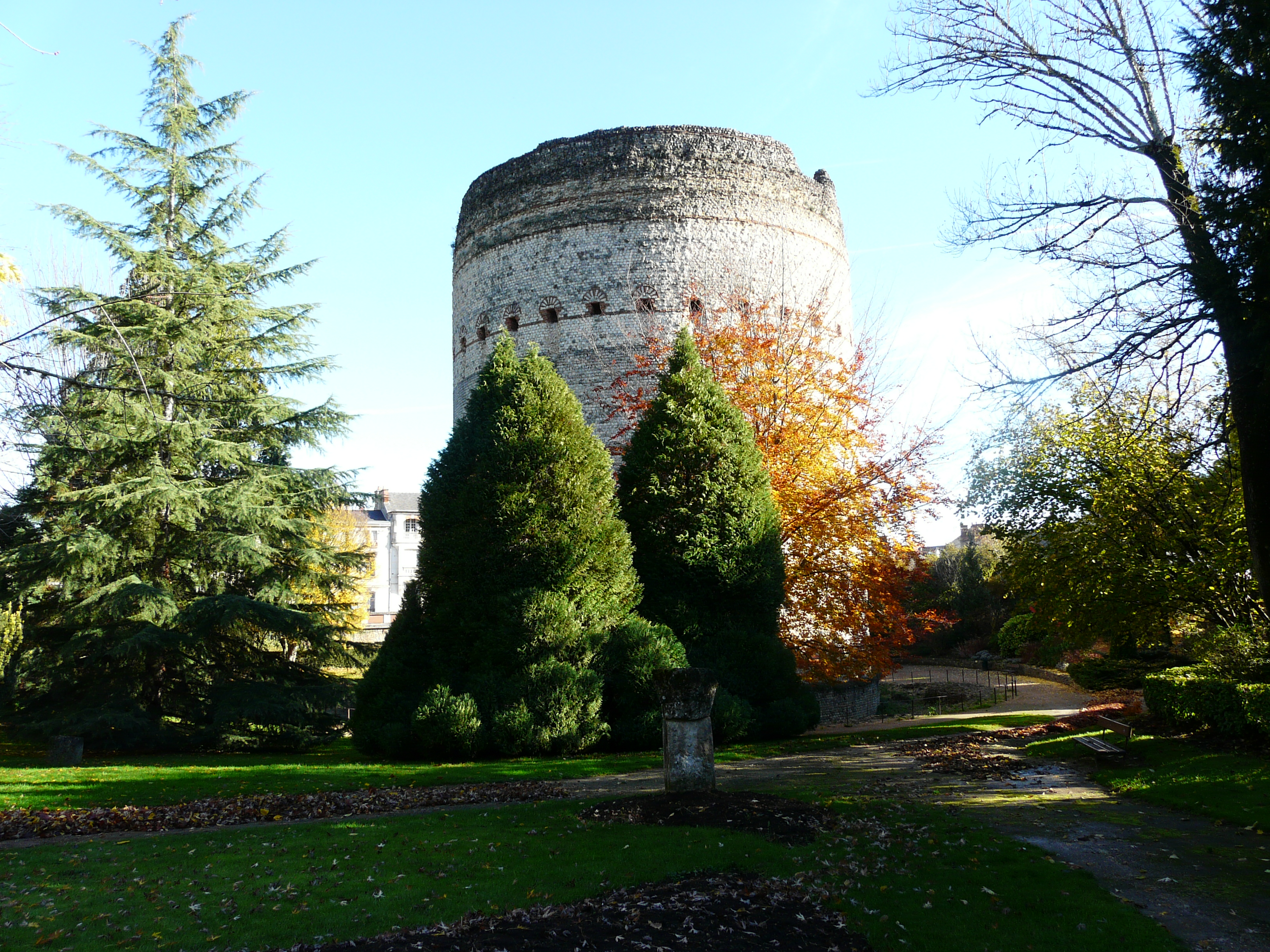
West side, in the Jardin de Vésone.

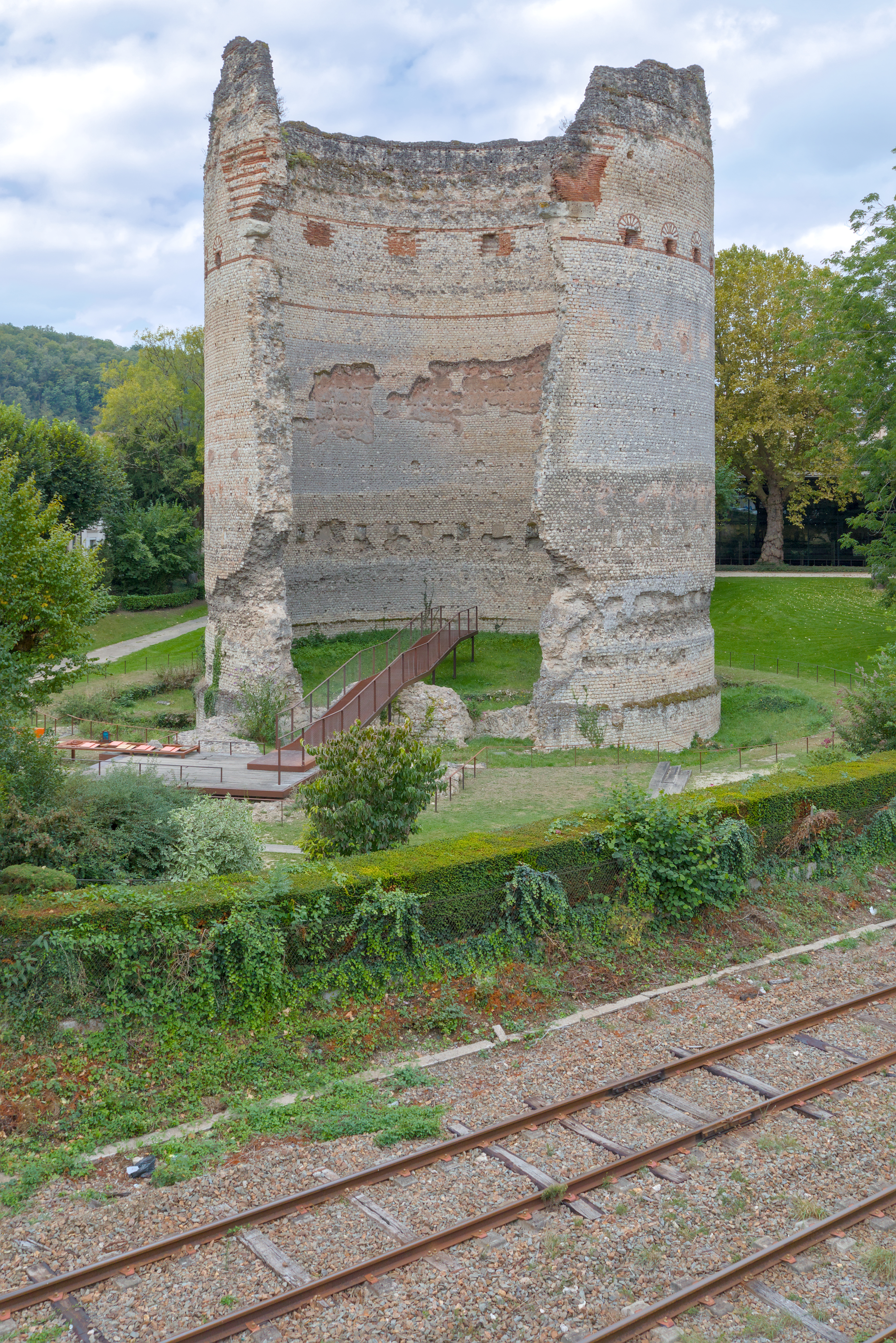
East side, bordered by a railway.

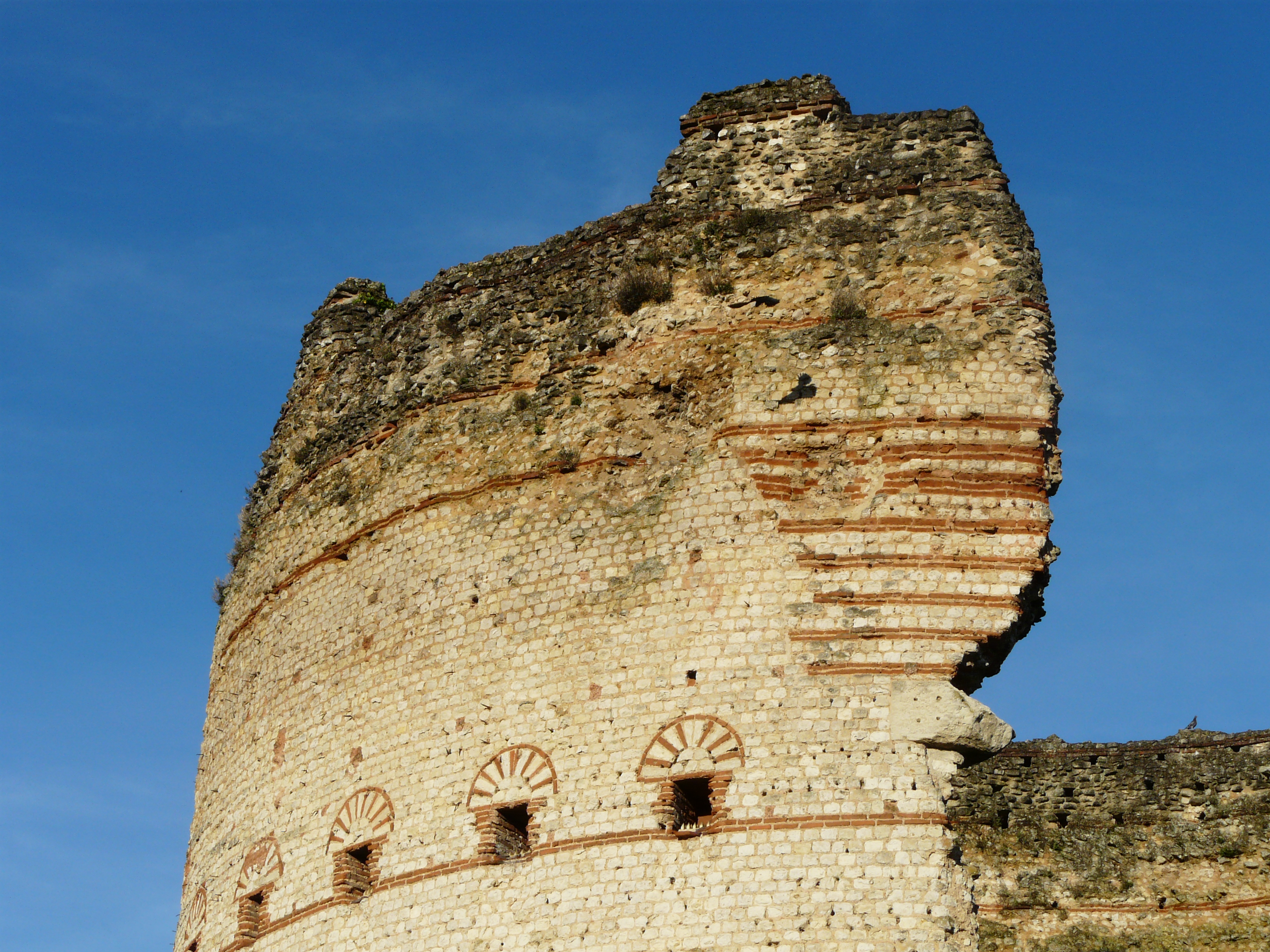
Detail of the tower's peak.

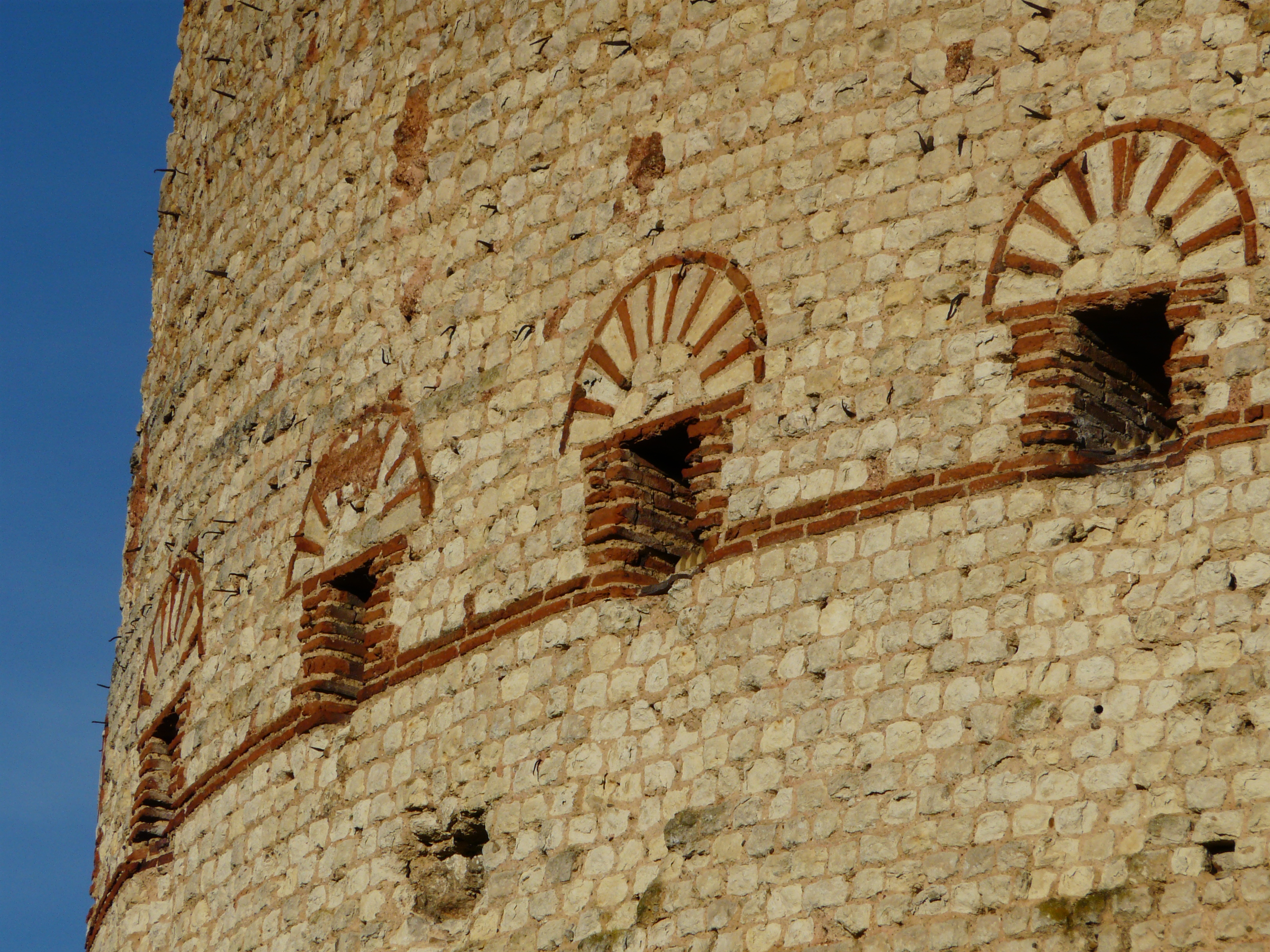
Detail of cavities in the brick.

== See also ==
- Petrocorii
- Celtic polytheism
- Gallo-Roman culture
- Gauls
