= Hôtel de Ville, Périgueux =

Town hall in Périgueux, France

Hôtel de Ville
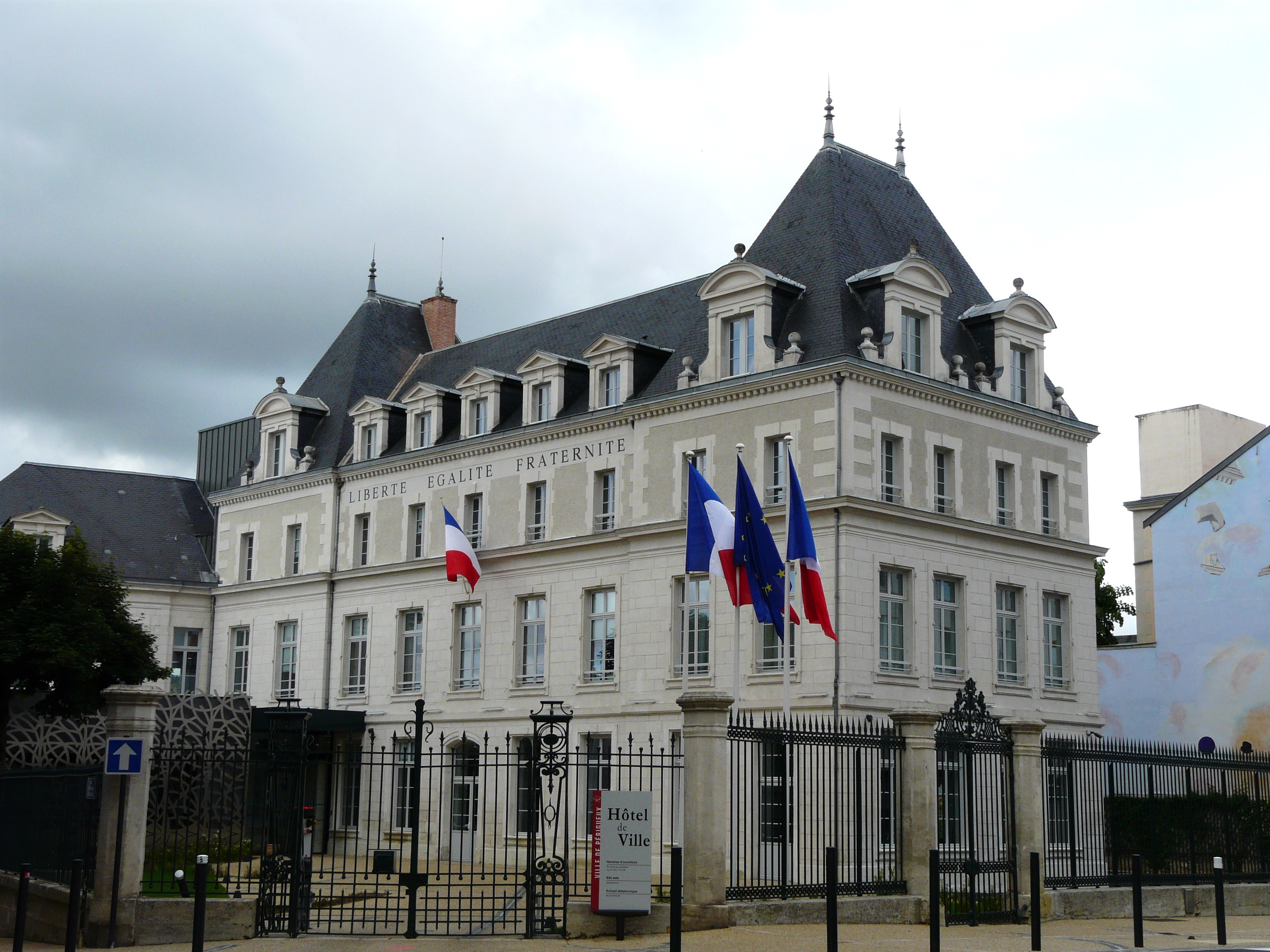
- The main frontage of the Hôtel de Ville in May 2013
- Interactive map of the Hôtel de Ville area

General information
- Type: City hall
- Architectural style: Neoclassical style
- Location: Périgueux, France
- Coordinates: 45.1839°N 0.7158°E
- Completed: 1790

The Hôtel de Ville (French pronunciation: [otɛl də vil], City Hall) is a municipal building in Périgueux, Dordogne, in southwestern France, standing on Rue du Président-Wilson.

== History ==
=== Maison du Consulat ===
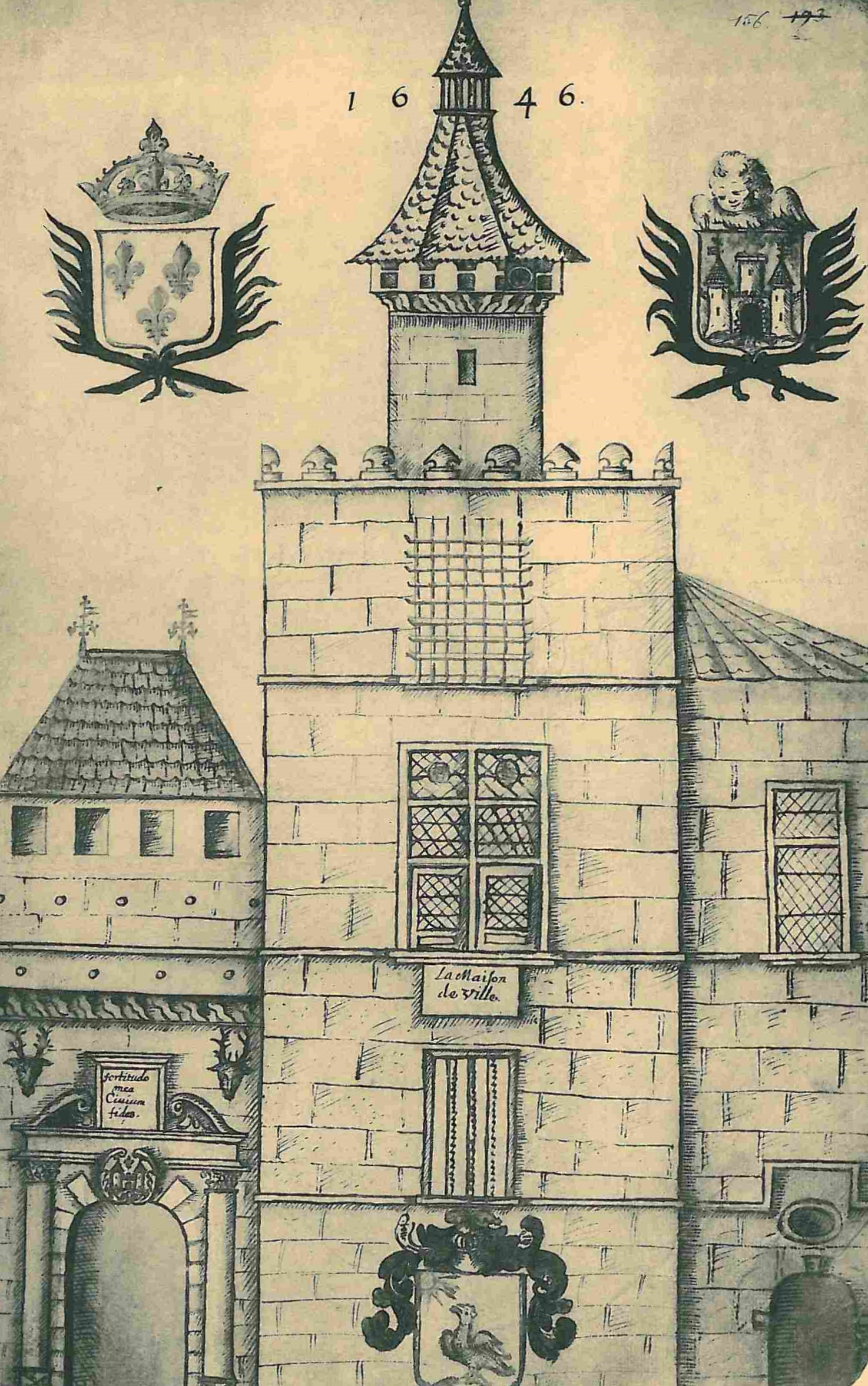
The Maison du Consulat

The consuls established their first town hall in a building on Coderc Plaza which became known as the Maison du Consulate. It was designed in the medieval style, built in stone and dated back to at least to 1240. It featured a four-stage tower which was surmounted by a parapet with machicolations, a lantern and a weather vane. The consuls commissioned the architects, Nicolas Rambourg et Blaise Bouin to rebuild it in 1636. It collapsed in 1829 and the site was later occupied by the Halle du Coderc.

=== Hôtel Lagrange-Chancel ===
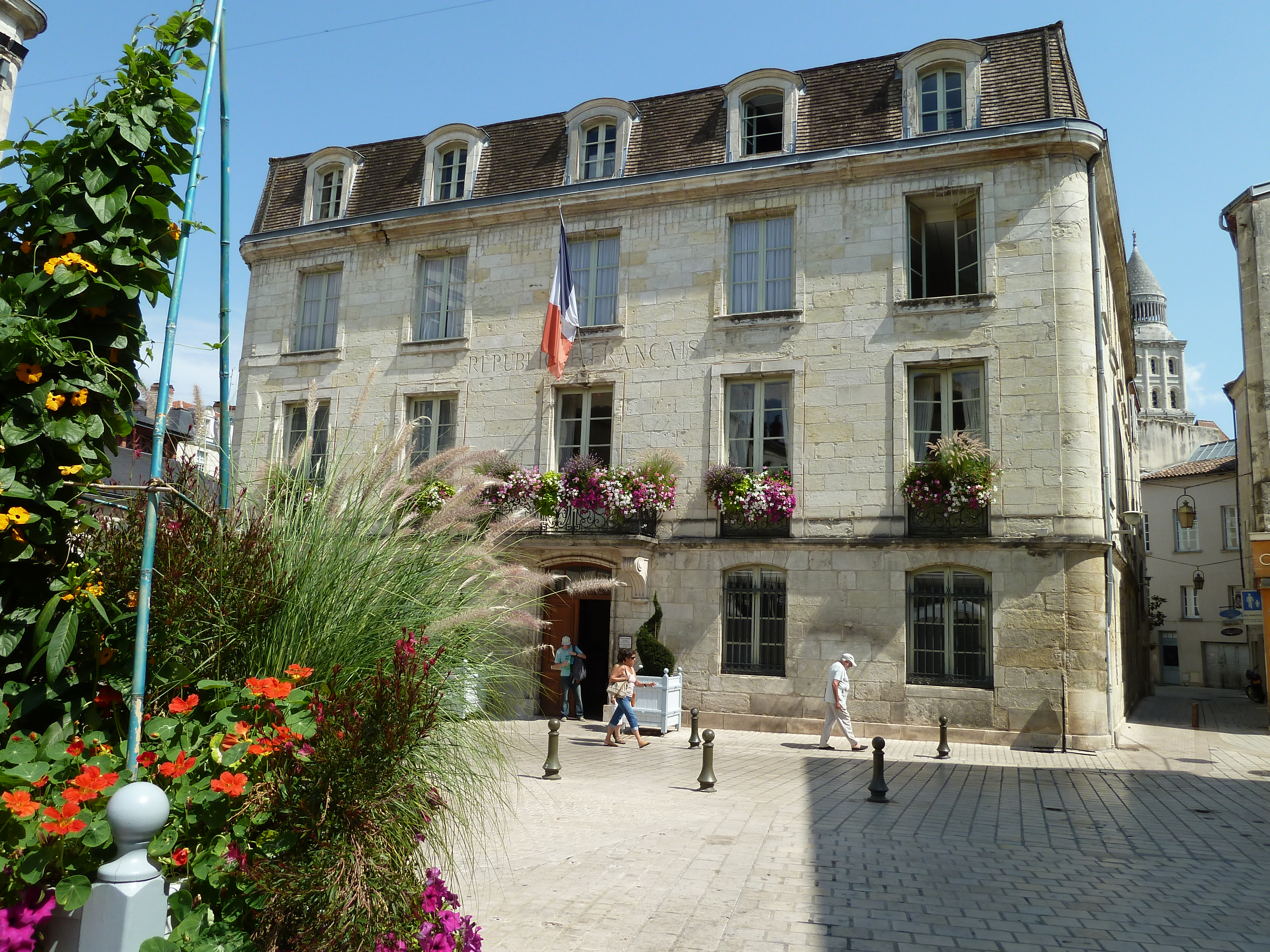
The Hôtel Lagrange-Chancel

After the Maison du Consulat collapsed, the town council decided to acquire a new municipal building. The building they selected was the Hôtel Lagrange-Chancel on Place Saint-Silain (now Place de l'Ancien-Hôtel-de-Ville). It was designed in the neoclassical style, built in ashlar stone and dated back to the 17th century. The house served as the home of the playwright and satirist, François Joseph Lagrange-Chancel, in the 18th century.

The design involved a symmetrical main frontage of five bays facing onto Place Saint-Silain. The central bay featured a doorway which was flanked by brackets supporting a balcony. It was fenestrated with casement windows on three floors and, at attic level, there were five dormer windows. It was acquired by the council for FFr 38,000 in 1830. Then after nearly two centuries of municipal service, it was sold to a property developer in 2013. The upper floors were subsequently converted to create 20 apartments.

=== Hôtel d'Aydie ===
In the early 21st century, the council decided to acquire a more substantial building. The building they selected was the Hôtel d'Aydie on Rue du Président-Wilson. It had been commissioned by François-Odet d'Aydie, who had served as a chaplain to Louis XV. The house was designed in the neoclassical style, built in ashlar stone and was completed in 1790.

The design involved a symmetrical main frontage of nine bays facing onto Rue de Bertrand du Guesclin with the last two bays at each end slightly projected forward as pavilions. The central bay featured a segmental headed doorway with a moulded surround. It was fenestrated with casement windows on three floors and, at attic level, there were seven dormer windows. The house became the home of a member of parliament, Jean d'Abzac de La Douze in 1806, an officers' mess in 1820 and, after briefly serving as a boarding school for young ladies, it became a tourist attraction, the Hôtel de l'Univers, in 1860. A fire caused considerable damage to the second floor in 1920. The Dordogne Chamber of Commerce and Industry purchased the building in 1922 and subsequently restored it.

A new block was built, extending the complex along Rue de Bertrand du Guesclin, in 1929. The second floor of the main building served as the office of the mayor of Strasbourg after 600,000 people were evacuated from Alsace–Lorraine in 1939 at the start of the Second World War. The chairman of the Provisional Government of the French Republic, General Charles de Gaulle, visited the town and spoke to the crowd from the balcony of the town hall in March 1945.

After the Dordogne Chamber of Commerce and Industry moved out of the building, it fell vacant and the council acquired it in 2009. After conversion works had been completed, it was officially re-opened by the mayor, Michel Moyrand, on 29 June 2013.

== Sources ==
- Penaud, Guy (2003). Le Grand Livre de Périgueux. éditions la Lauze. p. 142. ISBN 978-2912032508.
