= Vesunna Gallo-Roman Museum =

- Musée Vesunna
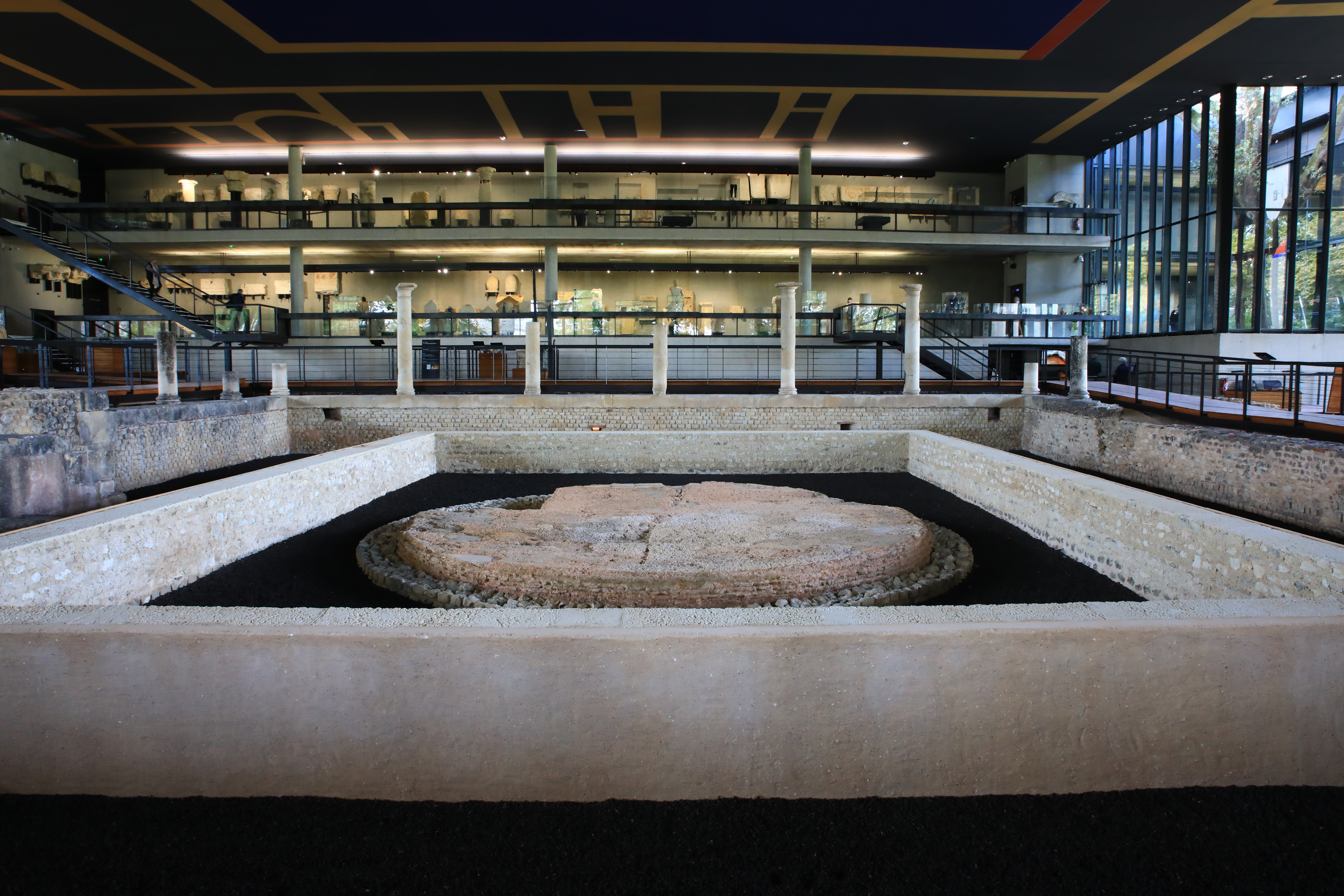
- Gallo-Roman ruins of the ancient Roman capital Vesunna, located at the site of the Museum.

- Location within France
- Established: 12 July 2003
- Location: 20, rue du 26e Régiment d'Infanterie, Périgueux, France
- Coordinates: 45.1799042°N 0.7127595°E
- Owner: Municipality of Perigueux
- Website: http://www.perigueux-vesunna.fr/a-city-under-the-city/

The Vesunna Gallo-Roman Museum is a museum of Gallo-Roman art and archaeology in the town of Périgueux, located in the French department of the Dordogne. The Gallo-Roman ruins are covered by a glass display that was constructed to protect a historical monument of France.

== History ==
=== The excavations of the domus of Bouquets ===
In 1959, a few metres from the Tower of Vesunna, the remains of a domus (wealthy urban town house) were discovered. During a project for the construction of rental housing on the site of municipal nurseries, archaeologists carried out surveys which brought to light Gallo-Roman walls adorned with painted plaster, preserved to a height of one meter high. What followed was a series of excavations:

- From 1960 to 1968, under the direction of Claude Barrière, assisted by Max Sarradet: the plan of the domus is updated. Archaeologists distinguished two stages in the occupation of the site: the domus was built in the first century AD, and then backfilled by over one meter in the middle of the second century. It has a kitchen, a triclinium (dining room), private thermal bath with the house centred on a garden with a pool. The remains are classified as a French Historical Monument on 25 October 1963.
- From 1973 to 1977, under the direction of Anne and Jean-Luc Tobie and Marc Gauthier: searches focused on the north and south of the site. They brought to light a peristyle colonnade to the North and a large reception room in the South. Several wells were excavated and they discovered a wooden pump in the well.
- From 1992 to 1995, under the direction of Claudine Girardy Caillat: surveys were conducted to prepare for the construction of the Museum. The excavations were organised around an oak tree and the area planned for the construction of a thick wall.
- From 1999 to 2000, under the direction of Luc Wozny: archaeologists excavated the street to the North of the (decumanus maximus) and updated the entry of the domus.

Upon discovery, the site was named the villa des Bouquets, after the name of the street that ran parallel to it. It is today called the Vesunna domus.

=== The Creation of the museum ===
There soon appeared the need to ensure conservation of the site. The idea of a museum building is old. The first projects had been studied before the end of the excavations. The decision was finally taken in 1992 by the municipal council of Périgueux. An architectural drawing competition took place in 1993. The museum was a project of Jean Nouvel, an architect born in Fumel, France and a winner of the Pritzker Prize in 2008. The main constraint that weighed on the project by Jean Nouvel was the impact of the future museum on a site that since 1963 had been classified as a historical monument. In response to this need, while ensuring maximum view ability to future visitors, Jean Nouvel created a project whose philosophy can be summed up in two words: protect and reveal the site:

- Protect the site against climatic hazards: for this a roof supported by 14 pillars 9 metres high was built. The impact on the ground of these pillars is minimal. They are based on micropiles driven deep into the ground, supporting studs a metre wide, holding the pillars. To the west, a 90 metre long concrete wall serves as a spur to an "umbrella roof".
- Reveal and so inform the gaze of the visitor confronted with the ruins: from a landscaped entrance around a green oak tree, two hundred years old, the visitor is led back in time. The museum building has a "thick wall" in the West and a vegetation barrier to the South to ensure that the gaze of the visitor is diverted from the modern buildings and allows the visitor to immerse themselves in the history of the inhabitants of the ancient city. The tour begins on the first floor where the model of the ancient city, Vesunna, reflects the urban plan in the second century of our era. It continues on two mezzanines where the work of the architect highlights the domus. The museum develops a theme of the city and public life. The route continues down onto the archaeological site, using a raised wooden deck floor resting on a metal frames. By following the displays, the visitor discovers the objects of the everyday life of the Gallo-Romans. Beyond the glass walls of the museum composed of suspended modules, one can identify the remains of the rampart of the 4th century and the Tower of Vesunna. The house of Taillefer, possibly occupied by the most famous archaeologist of Périgueux, is protected by the flowing roof of the museum and which house the office of the curator.

For the visitor who arrives in the garden of Vésone, the Museum is barely visible between the trees. The glass walls allow the site to be visible from the outside, the building looks like an open window on the past.

The Vesunna Museum opened its doors to the public on 12 July 2003.

On 12 to 14 July 2013, the Vesunna Museum celebrated ten years with events such as a free concert, a giant picnic in the park of Vésone, a film projection and a reconstruction of a Roman camp at the weekend.

In 2013, the museum and its amenities were labelled disability friendly for a period of five years.

== The Museum's collections ==
The permanent exhibition comprises the discoveries made on the territory of the Petrocorii people (Gauls) with a territory equivalent to that of the current Dordogne department. Blocks of limestone from the rampart of the fourth century AD are hung along the "thick wall". The collection is divided into two parts: on the mezzanines traces of public life in the city of the Petrocores and objects of daily life on the domus.

- After the model of Vésunna that puts into perspective the site in its urban environment, the visitor can observe the decorations and inscriptions of the public buildings of the city: the mosaic of the forum, models of temple and the Roman amphitheatre, aqueduct, the remains of columns. On the second mezzanine, presentations of the burial world, stela from the ramparts of the fourth century AD. Then on past the religious statuary and the theme of trade, before moving down onto the "domus".
- A 1:50 scale model shows the domus of Vésone at the end of second century AD. The collection cases are presented in themes: water with the presentation of a pump made of wood found in one of the wells, religion, heating, food, games, and care of the body.

The visit is conducted around the domus' central garden, where you can see a magnificent fresco representing rich marine fauna on a background of red Bordeaux, dating from the middle of the second century AD.

On the first floor, a room is used for temporary exhibitions. Until November 4, 2012, it was devoted to Jean-Claude Golvin. Discover the presentations from ancient cities from the work of the architect-archaeologist.

== Gallery ==
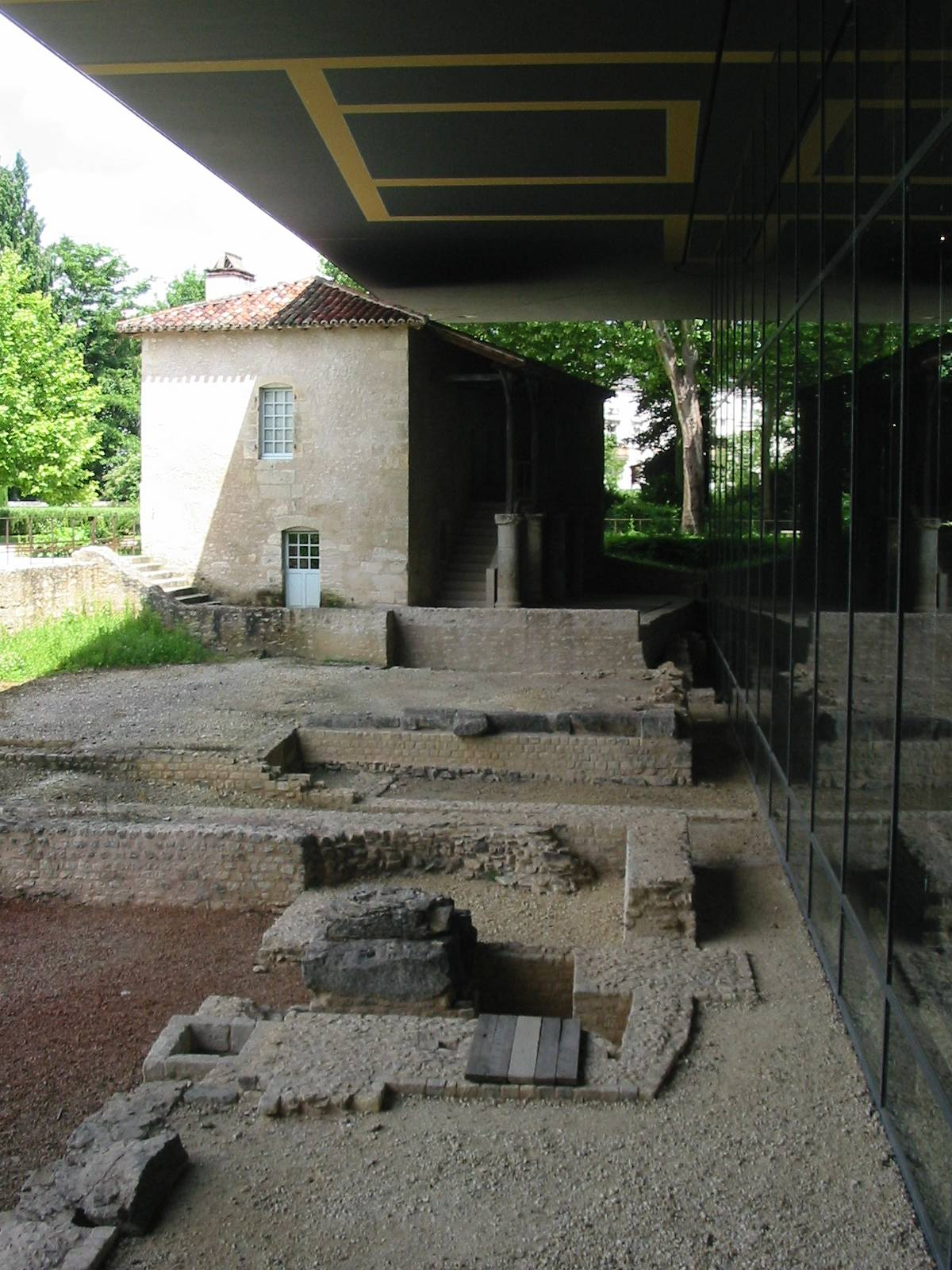
Side of museum

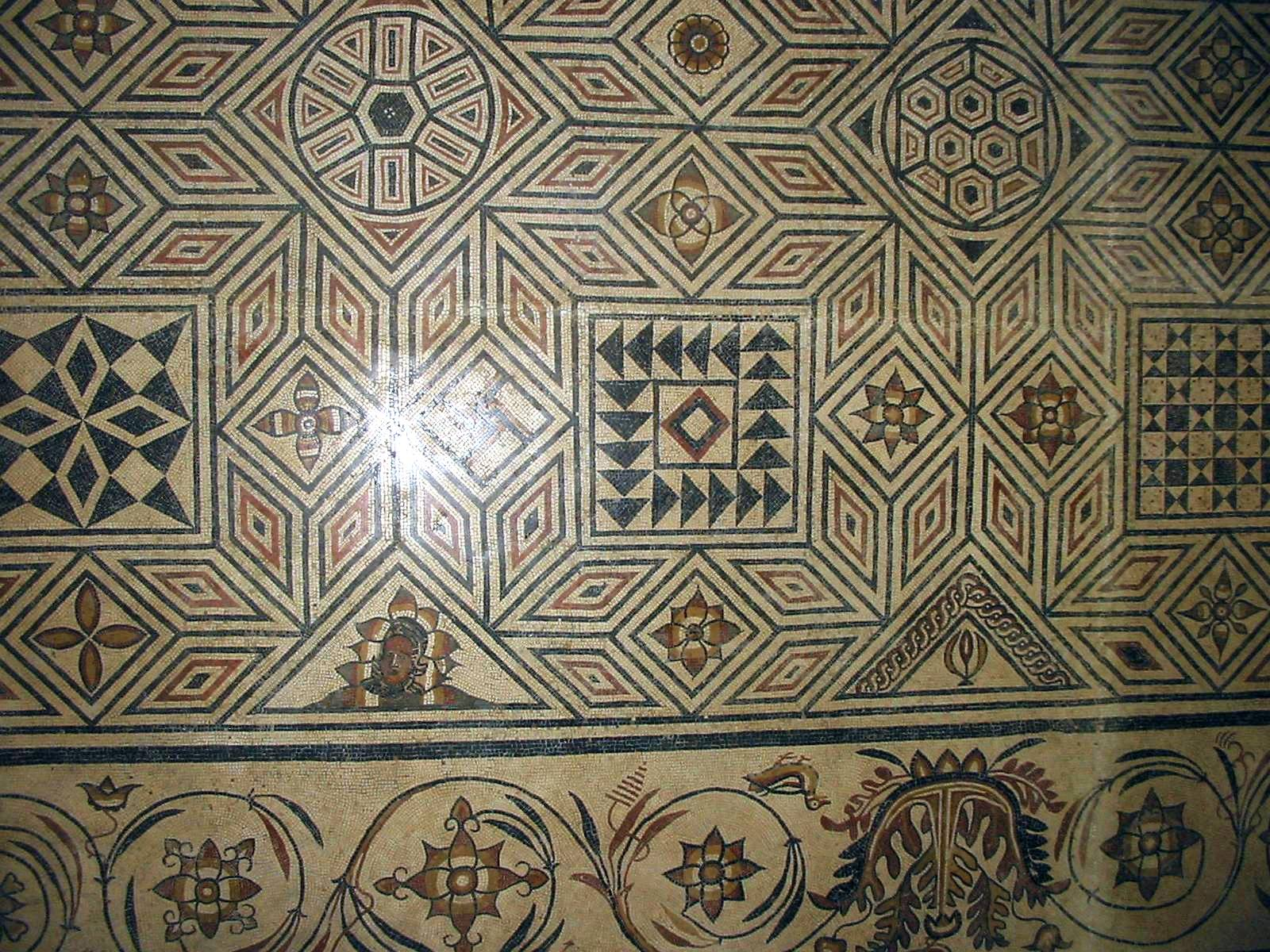
Mosaic floor

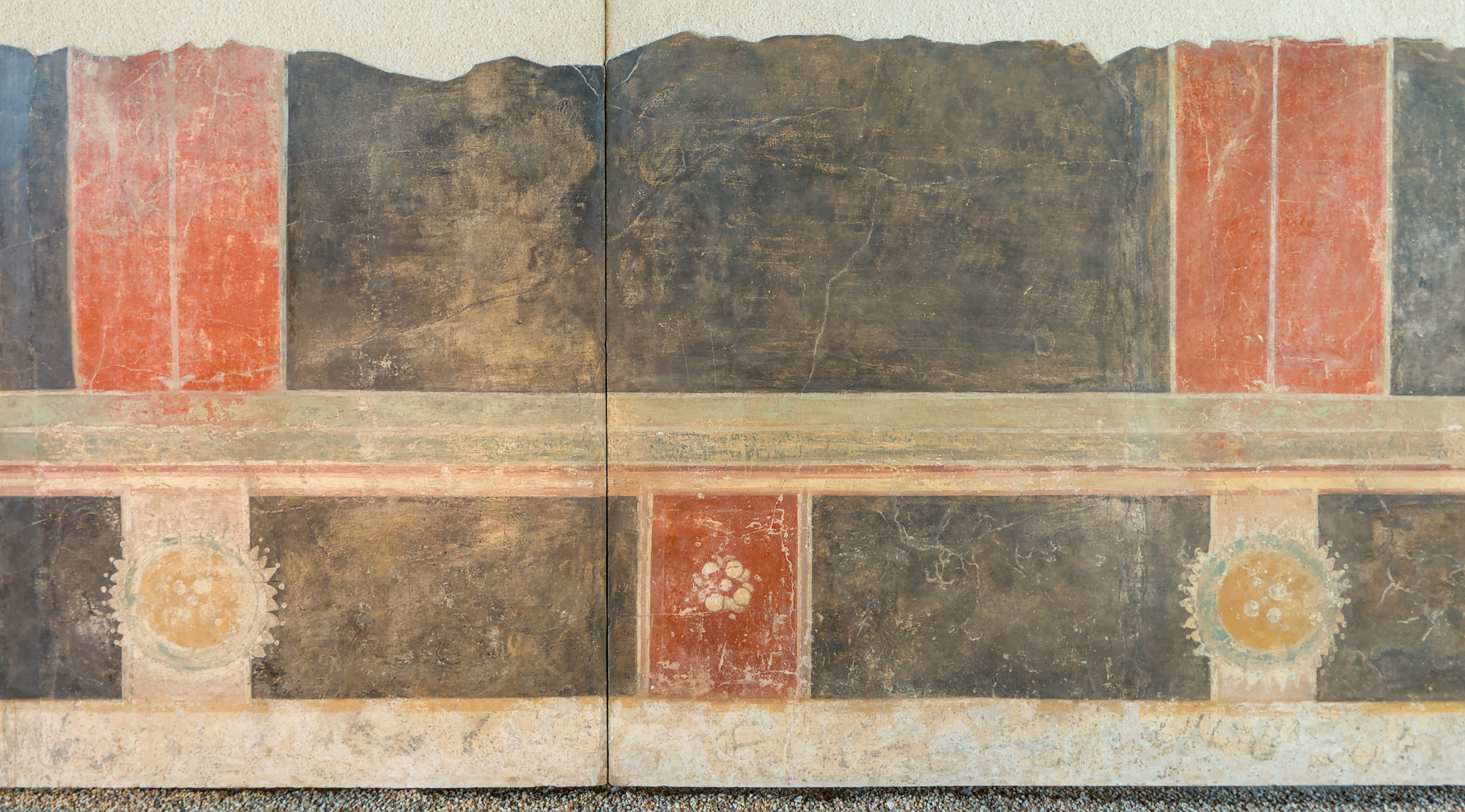
Decorated wall

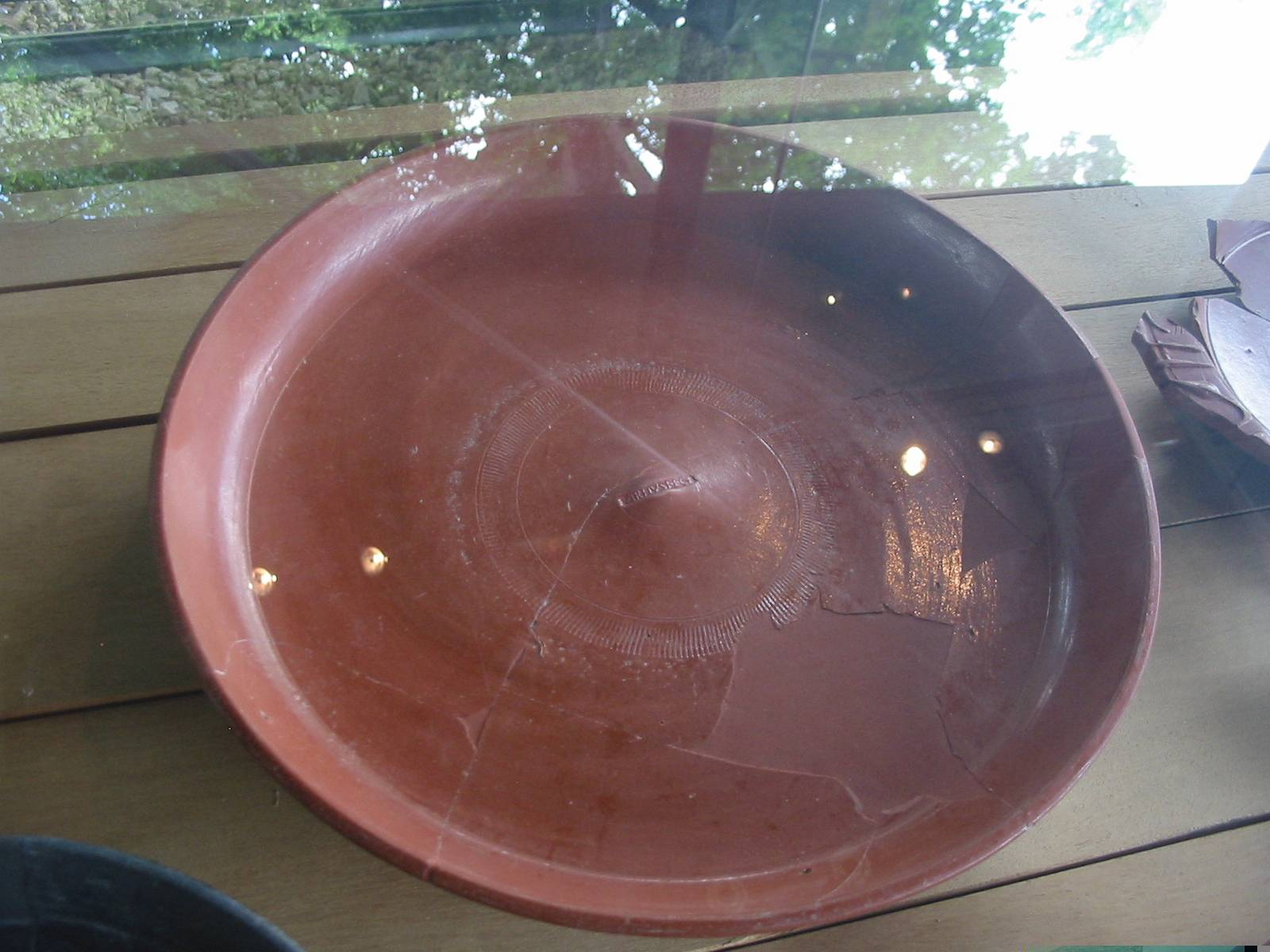
Plate

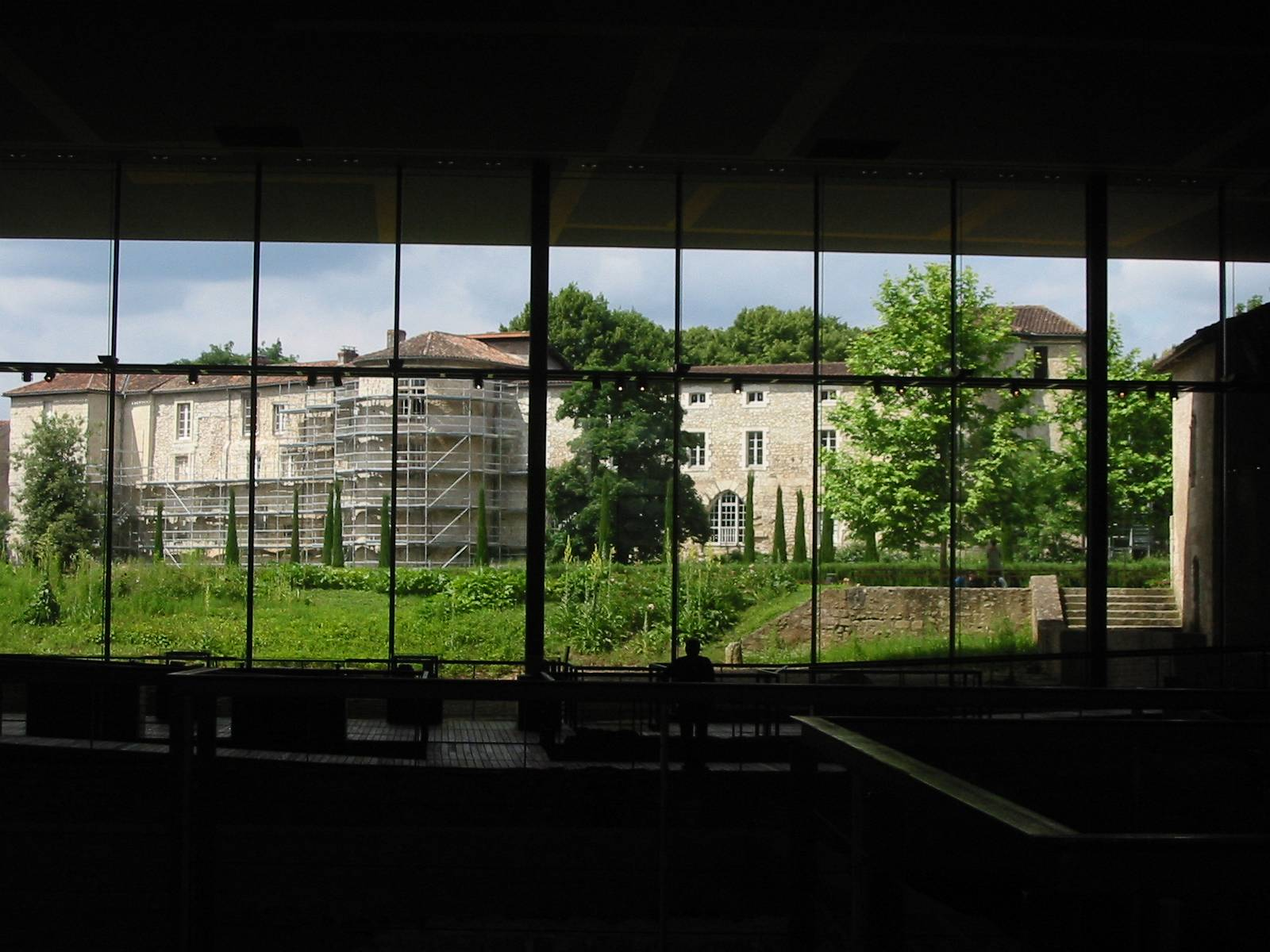
View of city walls from museum

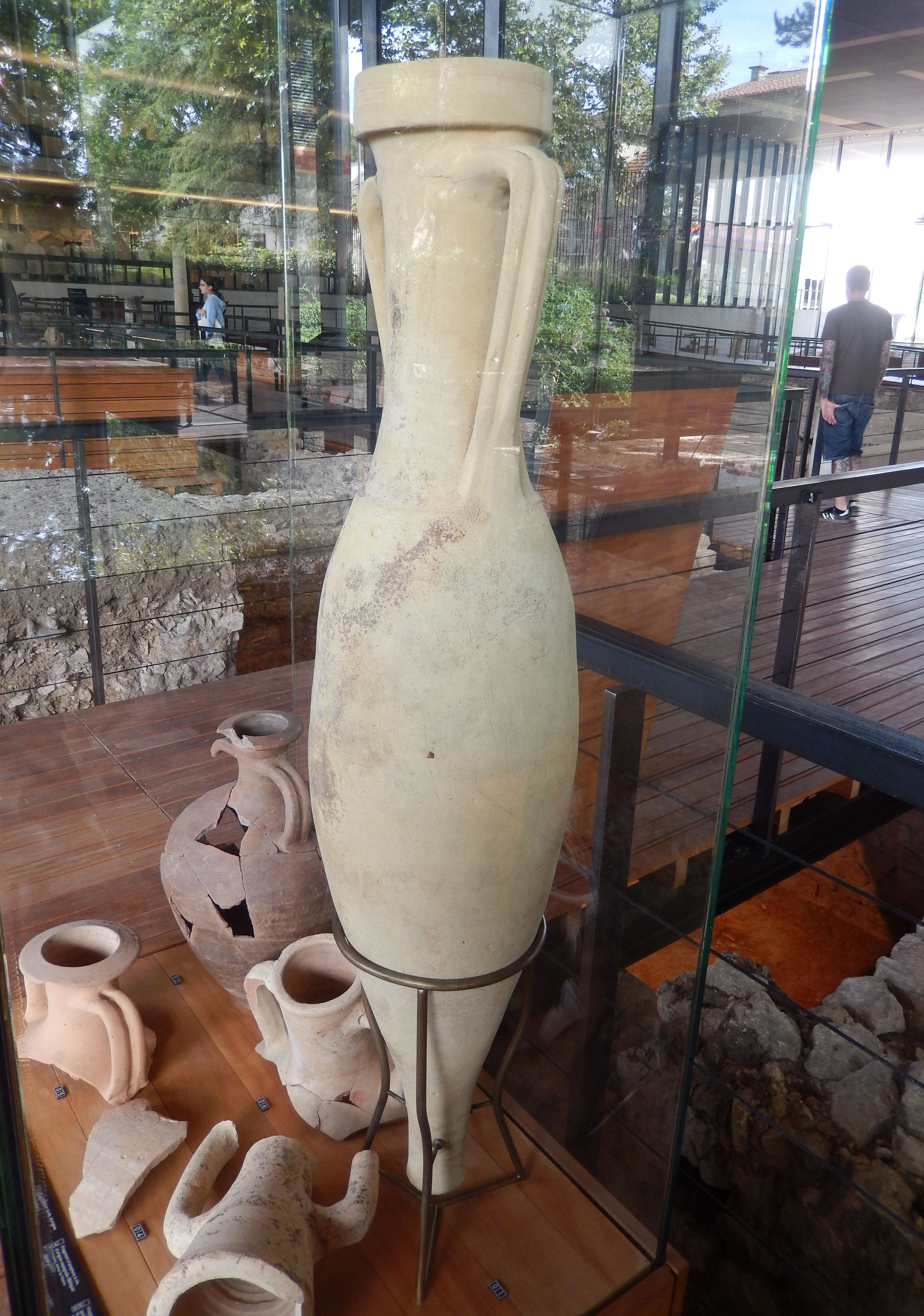
Amphora for garum, imported from Hispania Baetica

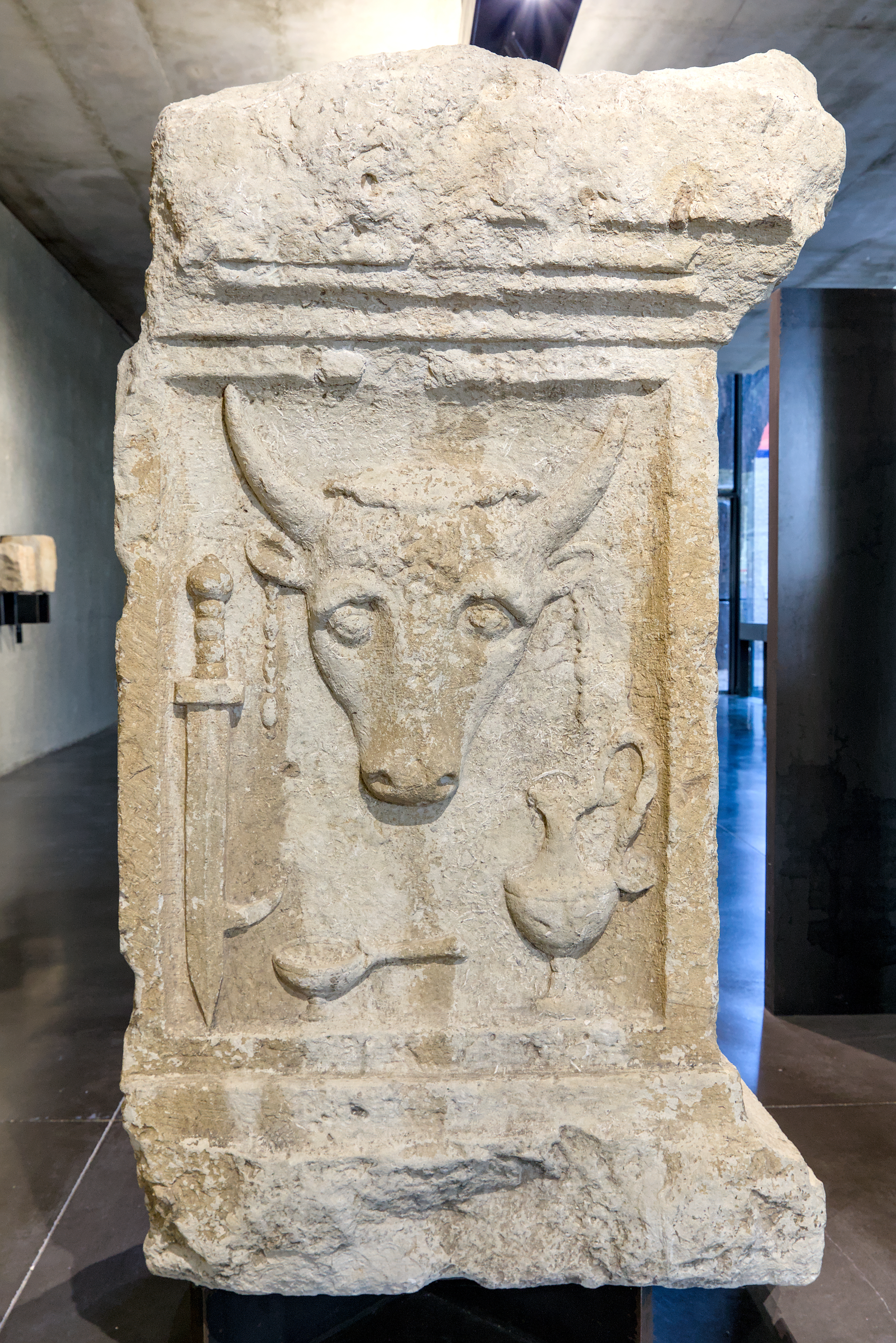
Tauribolium altar dedicated to Cybele (2nd century AD)

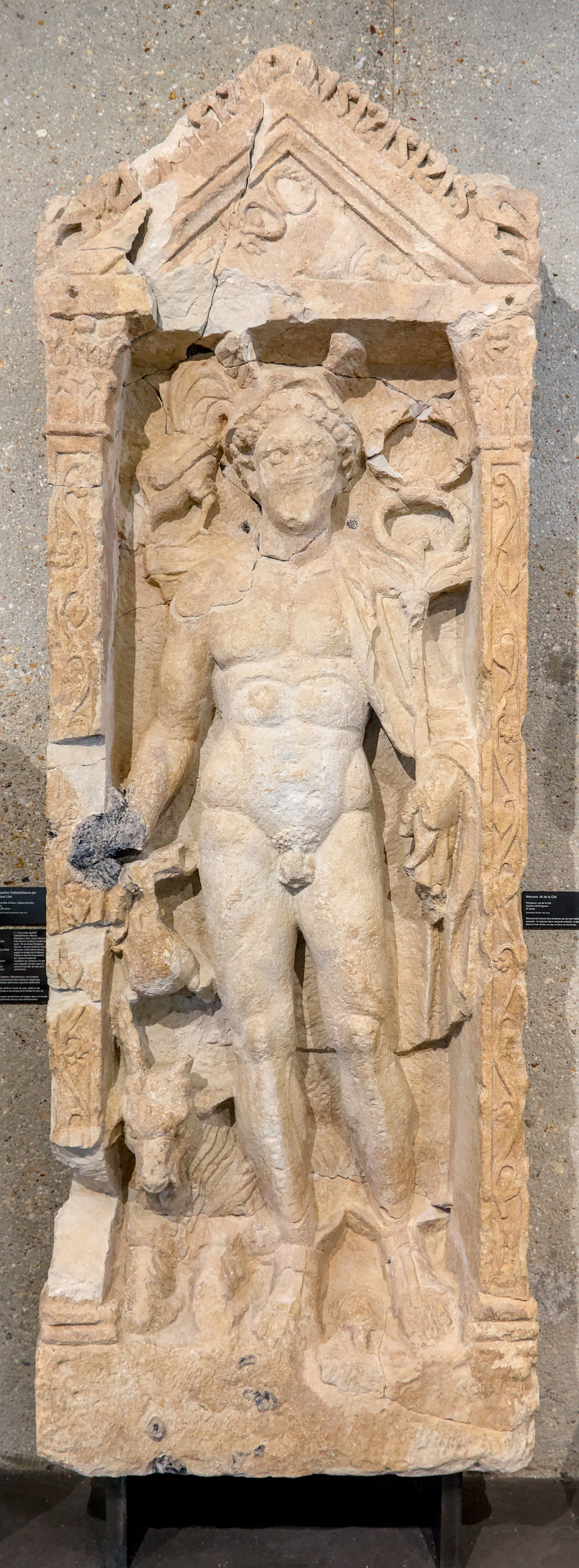
Relief of Mercurius, 2nd century AD

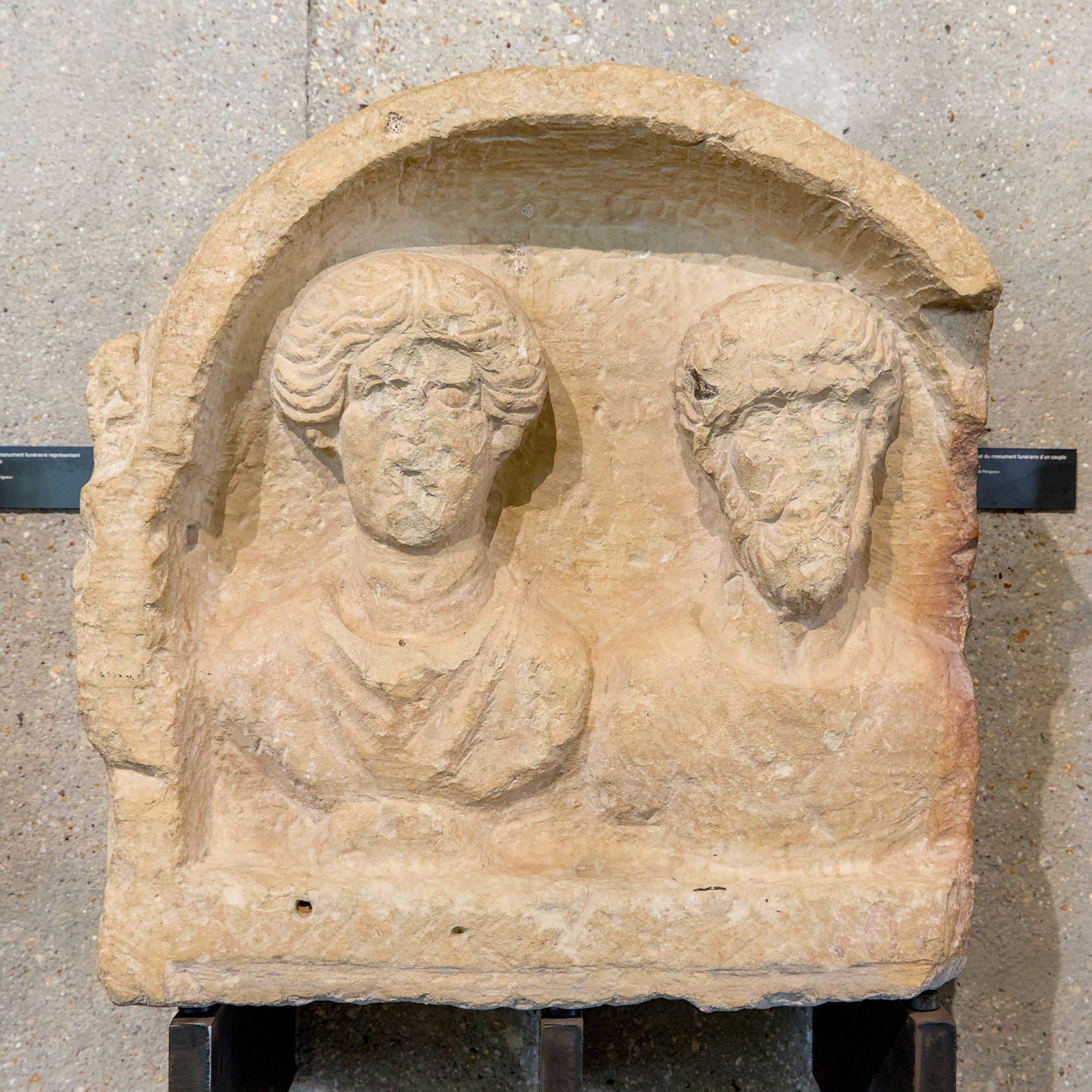
Top part of the tomb of a Roman couple
