= Alexander Evans =

Alexander Evans may refer to:

- Alexander Evans (American politician) (1818–1888), U.S. Representative from Maryland
- Alexander Evans (Australian politician) (1881–1955), member of the Tasmanian Legislative Council
- Alexander Evans (diplomat), British academic and former diplomat
- Alexander William Evans (1868–1959), botanist, bryologist, and mycologist
- Alex Evans (cyclist) (1997-present), professional cyclist

== See also ==
- Alex Evans (disambiguation)
