= Edmond Gaujac =

French composer and music educator

Edmond Gaujac (10 February 1895 – 5 October 1962) was a French composer and music educator.

== Life ==
Edmond Gaujac was born in Toulouse. After finishing school Gaujac completed an apprenticeship with a violin maker. He also attended courses at the music academy of his hometown. In 1911, he entered the Conservatoire de Paris, where he studied harmony with Xavier Leroux. His education was interrupted by the First World War. He was drafted into the army and awarded a Croix de Guerre.

After the War he continued his education at the music academy with Vincent d'Indy. In addition, he started a job as hornist in the orchestra of the Concerts Colonne, which was led at that time by Gabriel Pierné. After a Second Grand Prix in 1924 he won the Premier Grand Prix in 1927 at the competition for the Prix de Rome with the lyrical scene Coriolan.

After his return from his stay at the Villa Medici in Rome in 1931, Gaujac became director of the conservatoire de Lille. At the same time he took over the direction of the orchestra of Radio Lille. In 1945 he returned to Toulouse where he took over the direction of the music academy as successor of Aymé Kunc. The composers Jean-Marie Depelsenaire and Marcelle Villin were among his pupils .

Gaujac composed orchestral works, an oratorio, chamber music and songs.

== Selected works ==
- Les Amants de Vérone, cantata, 1924
- Coriolan, lyrical scene, 1927
- Vocalise for violin, viola, flute and oboe or trumpet, 1936
- Scherzetto for piano, 1937
- Pastorale for piano, 1938
- Impulsions für Klavier zu vier Händen, 1939
- Esquisses provençales for orchestra
- Symphonie romantique
- Fantaisie for orchestra
- Vénus et Adonis, lyrical scene
- Sainte-Germaine de Pibrac, Oratorio, 1935 by the Concerts Colonne
- Funambulie for saxophone
- 3 Pièces pantomimiques for alto saxophone and piano
- Rêves d’enfant, small suite for four saxophones.
