= Robert Lannoy =

French composer

Robert Lannoy (18 June 1915 – June 1979) was a French composer, second Prize of the Prix de Rome in 1946. He was then director of the Conservatoire de Lille for 33 years, until his death.

== Life ==
Born in Saint-Amand-les-Eaux, Nord department of France in a family of carillonneurs, Lannoy was quickly introduced to the bell tradition. He began his musical studies at the Conservatory of Valenciennes where he studied harmony, violin and bassoon with master Fernand Lamy.

He was accepted at the Conservatoire de Paris and obtained the supreme awards in the writing classes.

He presented himself in vain for the first time for the Prix de Rome in 1938. During his studies at the conservatory, he was also a soldier-musician in the 5th Line Infantry Regiment of Courbevoie.

Lannoy was taken prisoner at the beginning of the Second World War and remained so for 5 years despite a few escapes. Sent to Czechoslovakia, he escaped but could not resist visiting Bayreuth, the city of Wagner and was retaken. Sent to Ukraine, in the disciplinary camp of Rawa Ruska, he attempted another escape in 1942, which led to his internment at the citadel of Lemberg.

Then sent to Austria in 1943 in a Stalag, he was appointed Kapellmeister and organized orchestras, choirs and even a ballet-mime, Pygmalion, played by prisoners in Poland.

He was rewarded for these facts by the médaille de la Résistance, the medal of interné résistant and the Escapees' Medal.

Freed by the American army, he returned to Paris in 1945. At the request of the Americans, he composed the music for the documentary film Homecoming, recounting the return of prisoners after the Second World War and directed by Henri Cartier-Bresson.

For the radio, and at the request of Henri Dutilleux, he composed La légende des pays alliés by Louise de Vilmorin

He competed again for the Prix de Rome in 1946 and obtained a second major prize, which earned him the position of director of the Conservatoire de Lille.

It was during this period that he married pianist Lola Delwarde, who had a brilliant career as a concert pianist. He conducted many concerts and introduced a whole generation of Lille students to music.

Lannoy died in Lille in June 1979.

== Works ==
=== Chamber music ===
- Wind Quintet - (2 bassoons) - 1936
- Wind Quintet Sinfonietta - 1946
- String quartet Lamento
- Piece for harp and string quartet - Mort de Roger Salengro
- Deux virelais du Moyen âge - Soprano, flute, clarinet and viola - 1944
- Ballade de l'épinette amoureuse - Four female voices, oboe, English horn, B♭ clarinet and bassoon - 1937

=== Voice ===
==== Voice and piano ====
- Il pleut doucement sur la ville - Concerto grosso - juin 1932
- Tristesse de banlieue - Concours des Rosatis - 1934
- Vision de Saül - March 1939
- 2 melodies on a poem by Francis Carco - 1941
- Song for soprano and piano - text by Maeterlinck - May 1946
- Vocalise for soprano and piano - June 1951
- Aimer - voix et piano - poem by Victor Hugo
- Chanson de Silvio - voice and piano
- Danièle, fille de Dieu - voice and instrumental ensemble - October 1952

==== Choir ====
- Pierrot gamin - choir with 4 mixed voices and piano - text by Verlaine - 1938
- Esquisse de soir de bataille - choir and orchestra or 2 pianos on a text by José-Maria de Heredia - 1939
- Pleine nuit (esquisse) - choir and orchestra - Courbevoie - 1939
- Le soir devant Sybaris - choir and orchestra - 1939
- Hortense, couches-toi - piano and men's choir after Courteline - September 1941
- Arrangements for choir and orchestra of L'amour de moy, Marche des soldats de Turenne, Roule donc, J'aimerai bien apprendre au monde - Camp de Rawa - Ruska - 1942
- Chant des déportés (arrangement and orchestration) - 1943
- Le jeu de l'amour et du hasard - one-act cantata - 1st Second Grand Prix de Rome - June 1946
- Les prophéties - oratorio for narrator, choir and orchestra (commissioned by the State) - April 1961
- Sanctus - male voices and organ for the Choral of the XXX - Wormhout - August 1973
- Sanctus - mixed choir and pipe organ

==== Operetta ====
- Farce du mari fondu

=== Orchestra ===
- Concerto grosso - January 1938 - for string orchestra and timpani
- Cantilène et danse pastorale - Christmas 1943 - for orchestra ( captivity in Austria)
- Le Retour - January 1945 - Music for Henri Cartier-Bresson's film - Released in Paris on January 24, 1946 at the Champs-Élysées cinema. He made a symphonic suite of it in January 1954.
- Lamento ukrainien - Christmas 1948 - State commission - A version for string quartet and a version for chamber orchestra and timpani.
- Campanile - February 1951 - Prelude for orchestra
- Le Roman de la rose - March 1951 - Ballet mime for chamber orchestra (Mont Cassel)
- Les Prophéties - April 1961 - State commission - Oratorio for narrator, choir and symphony orchestra.

=== Music for chimes ===
- Ballet des petits canards
- Prélude N°1
- Prélude N°2
