= 2020 Tour de France, Stage 12 to Stage 21 =

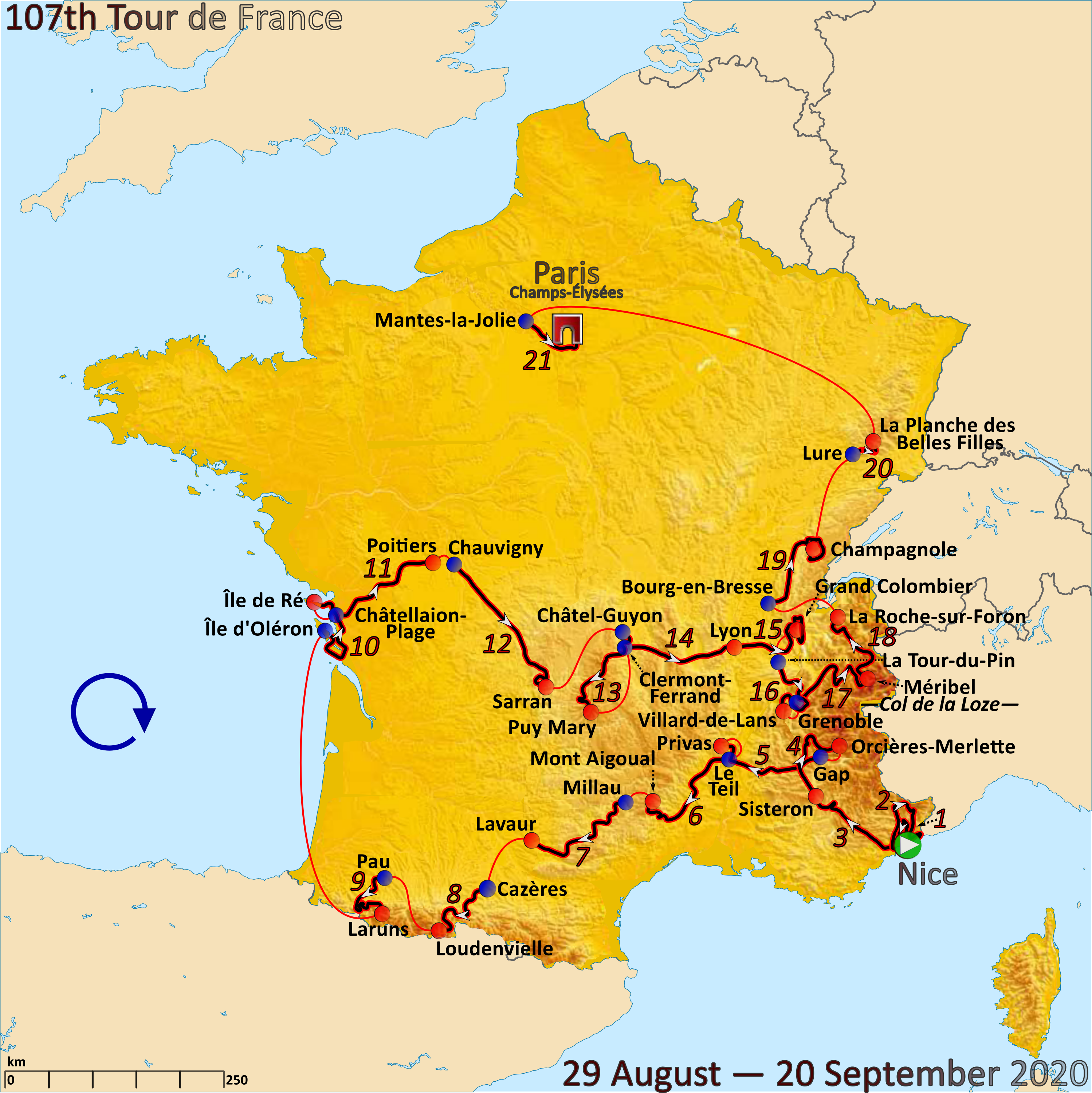
Route of the 2020 Tour de France

The 2020 Tour de France is the 107th edition of Tour de France, one of cycling's Grand Tours. The Tour began in Nice with a hilly stage on 29 August, and Stage 12 occurred on 10 September with a hilly stage from Chauvigny. The race finished on the Champs-Élysées in Paris on 20 September.

== Classification standings ==
Legend
A yellow jersey.	Denotes the leader of the general classification	A white jersey with red polka dots.	Denotes the leader of the mountains classification
A green jersey.	Denotes the leader of the points classification	A white jersey.	Denotes the leader of the young rider classification
A white jersey with a yellow number bib.	Denotes the leader of the team classification	A white jersey with a red number bib.	Denotes the winner of the combativity award

== Stage 12 ==
10 September 2020 – Chauvigny to Sarran, 218 km (135 mi)

The stage breakaway contained Sánchez. Walscheid, Asgreen, Erviti, Burgaudeau and Politt. The latter won the intermediate sprint and Burgaudeau collected mountain points on two occasions. The peloton caught the last survivors with 43 kilometers left, while riders from the peloton launched multiple attacks. Soler, Pacher, Schachmann and Team Sunweb trio Benoot, Kragh Andersen and Marc Hirschi made the front group on the Côte de la Croix du Pey. A dozen of riders formed a chasing group. The decisive move by Hirschi came on Suc au May, 26 kilometers before the finish. The Swiss rider reached his first World Tour victory. Pierre Rolland finished second and Søren Kragh Andersen third.

Stage 12 Result
Rank	Rider	Team	Time
1	Marc Hirschi (SUI)	Team Sunweb	5h 08' 49"
2	Pierre Rolland (FRA)	B&B Hotels–Vital Concept	+ 47"
3	Søren Kragh Andersen (DEN)	Team Sunweb	+ 52"
4	Quentin Pacher (FRA)	B&B Hotels–Vital Concept	+ 52"
5	Jesús Herrada (ESP)	Cofidis	+ 52"
6	Maximilian Schachmann (GER)	Bora–Hansgrohe	+ 52"
7	Hugo Houle (CAN)	Astana	+ 52"
8	Sébastien Reichenbach (SUI)	Groupama–FDJ	+ 52"
9	Kenny Elissonde (FRA)	Trek–Segafredo	+ 56"
10	Nicolas Roche (IRL)	Team Sunweb	+ 56"

General classification after Stage 12
Rank	Rider	Team	Time
1	Primož Roglič (SLO)	Team Jumbo–Visma	51h 26' 46"
2	Egan Bernal (COL)	INEOS Grenadiers	+ 21"
3	Guillaume Martin (FRA)	Cofidis	+ 28"
4	Romain Bardet (FRA)	AG2R La Mondiale	+ 30"
5	Nairo Quintana (COL)	Arkéa–Samsic	+ 32"
6	Rigoberto Urán (COL)	EF Pro Cycling	+ 32"
7	Tadej Pogačar (SLO)	UAE Team Emirates	+ 44"
8	Adam Yates (GBR)	Mitchelton–Scott	+ 1' 02"
9	Miguel Ángel López (COL)	Astana	+ 1' 15"
10	Mikel Landa (ESP)	Bahrain–McLaren	+ 1' 42"

== Stage 13 ==
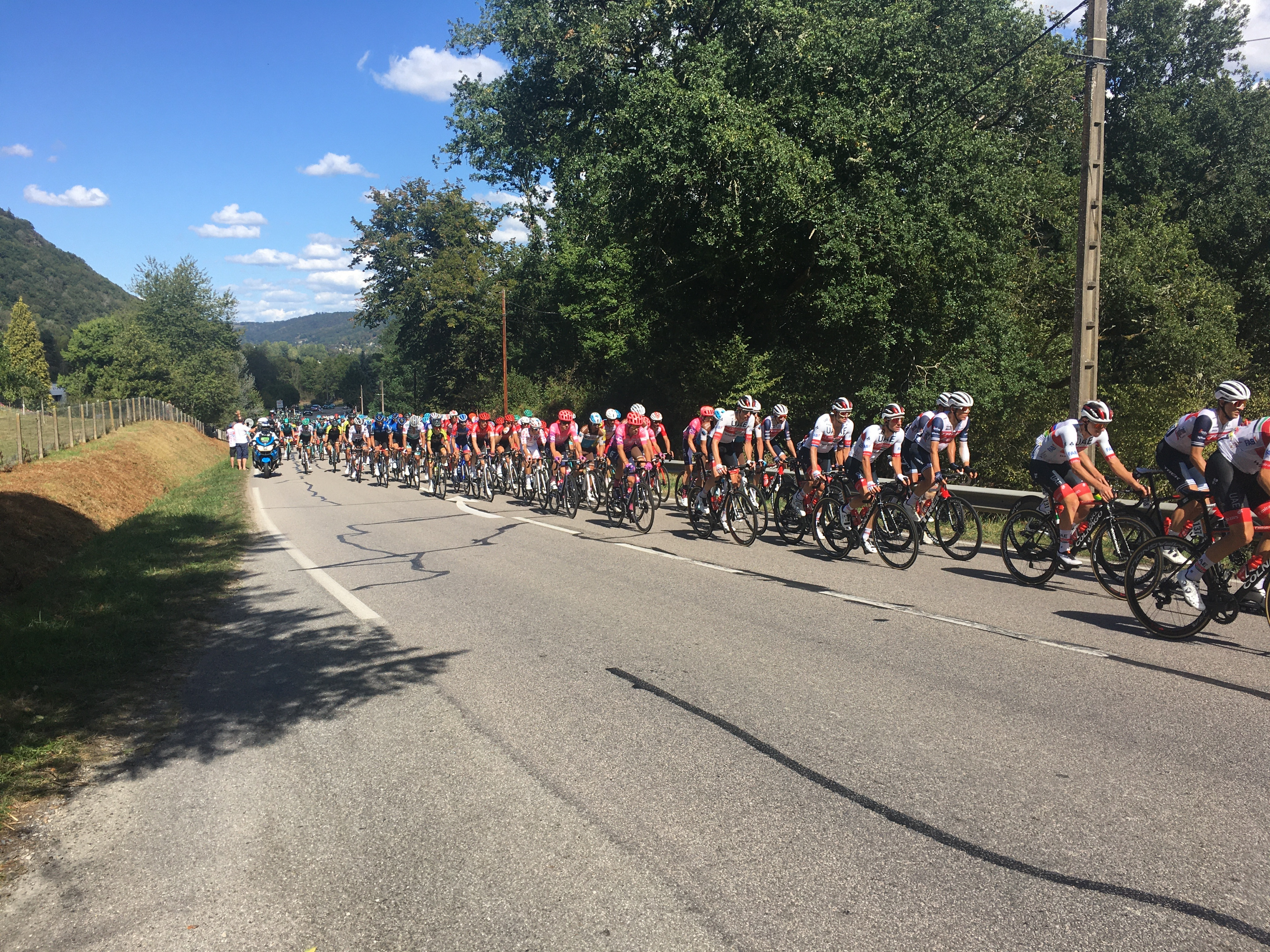
Bort-les-Orgues

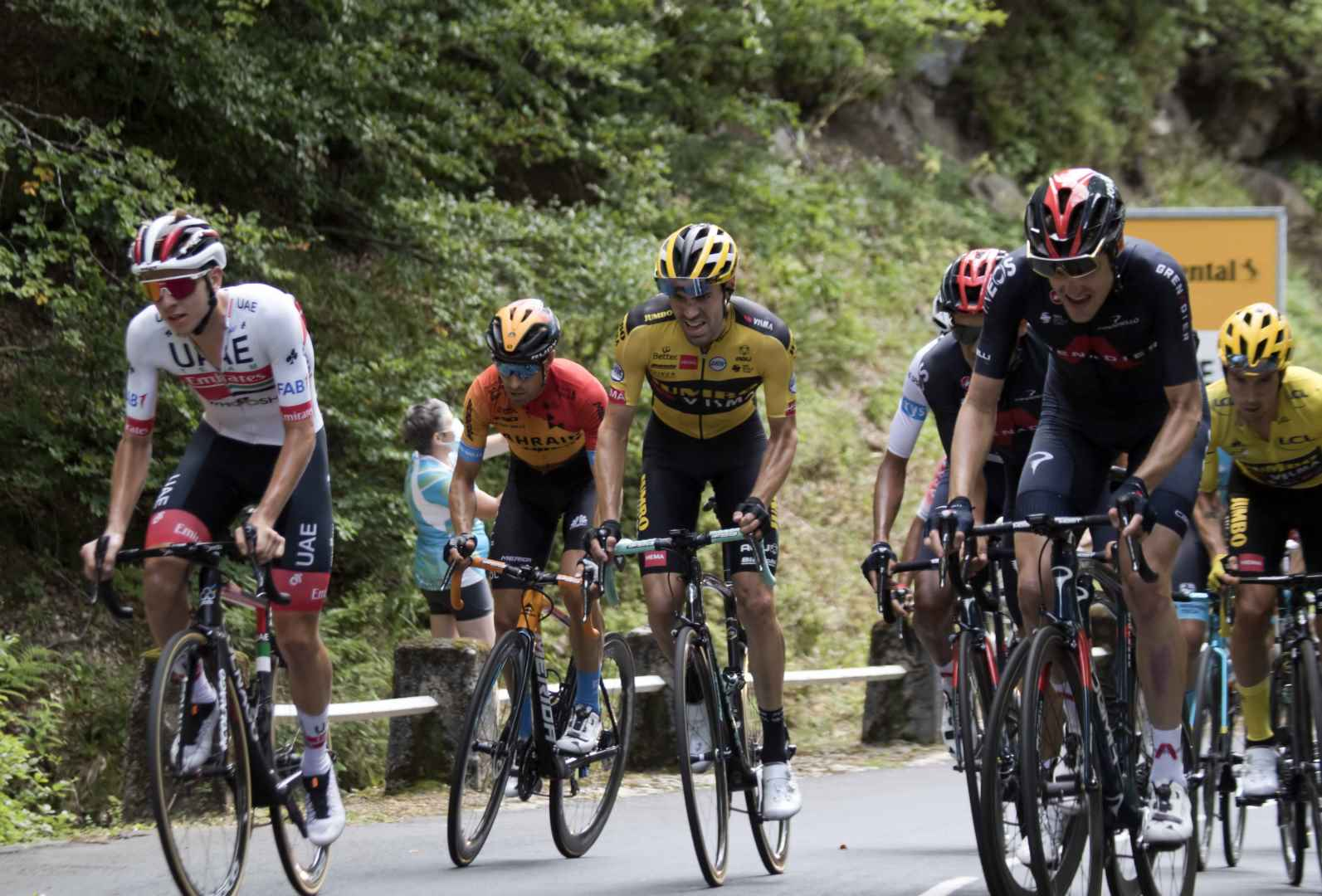
A group of GC contenders, including (from left-to-right) eventual winner Tadej Pogačar, Mikel Landa, Tom Dumoulin, defending champion Egan Bernal, 2018 winner Geraint Thomas, and then-race leader Primož Roglič

11 September 2020 – Châtel-Guyon to Puy Mary, 191.5 km (119.0 mi)

Many riders were trying to form a breakaway and seventeen riders finally allied together around 60 kilometers after race began. Simon Geschke and Valentin Madouas won the mountain bonuses on two category 2 climbs, Pierre Rolland won two mountain bonuses on category 3 climbs. Julian Alaphilippe was first on intermediate sprint. The advantage on the peloton grew up to 11 minutes, so the stage winner was expected to be from the breakaway. Neilson Powless attacked first. Maximilian Schachmann joined him with 29 kilometers remaining. Powless was dropped on Col de Néronne and his teammate Daniel Martínez accelerated from breakaway group, followed by Schachmann's teammate Lennard Kämna. Both riders overtook Schachmann within last two kilometers. The Colombian won the sprint for the stage victory. Kämna and Schachmann filled the podium.

Meanwhile, crash injuries forced Bauke Mollema and Romain Bardet to leave the race. INEOS Grenadiers led the peloton to Col de Neronne. Martin was in trouble. Roglič and Pogačar pushed hard on the Pas de Peyrol. Landa, Porte, López were chasing and they dropped Egan Bernal. The Slovenian duo reached the summit six minutes behind the stage winner. Landa, Porte and López finished less than 20 seconds behind them. Bernal came along with Quintana, Urán and Yates. The title defender lost 38 seconds to Roglič. Pogačar jumped to second place overall. Guillaume Martin finished almost three minutes behind the race leader and fell outside the top 10 in general classification.

Stage 13 Result
Rank	Rider	Team	Time
1	Daniel Martínez (COL)	EF Pro Cycling	5h 01' 47"
2	Lennard Kämna (GER)	Bora–Hansgrohe	+ 4"
3	Maximilian Schachmann (GER)	Bora–Hansgrohe	+ 51"
4	Valentin Madouas (FRA)	Groupama–FDJ	+ 1' 33"
5	Pierre Rolland (FRA)	B&B Hotels–Vital Concept	+ 1' 42"
6	Nicolas Edet (FRA)	Cofidis	+ 1' 53"
7	Simon Geschke (GER)	CCC Team	+ 2' 35"
8	Marc Soler (ESP)	Movistar Team	+ 2' 43"
9	Hugh Carthy (GBR)	EF Pro Cycling	+ 3' 18"
10	David de la Cruz (ESP)	UAE Team Emirates	+ 3' 52"

General classification after Stage 13
Rank	Rider	Team	Time
1	Primož Roglič (SLO)	Team Jumbo–Visma	56h 34' 35"
2	Tadej Pogačar (SLO)	UAE Team Emirates	+ 44"
3	Egan Bernal (COL)	INEOS Grenadiers	+ 59"
4	Rigoberto Urán (COL)	EF Pro Cycling	+ 1' 10"
5	Nairo Quintana (COL)	Arkéa–Samsic	+ 1' 12"
6	Miguel Ángel López (COL)	Astana	+ 1' 31"
7	Adam Yates (GBR)	Mitchelton–Scott	+ 1' 42"
8	Mikel Landa (ESP)	Bahrain–McLaren	+ 1' 55"
9	Richie Porte (AUS)	Trek–Segafredo	+ 2' 06"
10	Enric Mas (ESP)	Movistar Team	+ 2' 54"

== Stage 14 ==
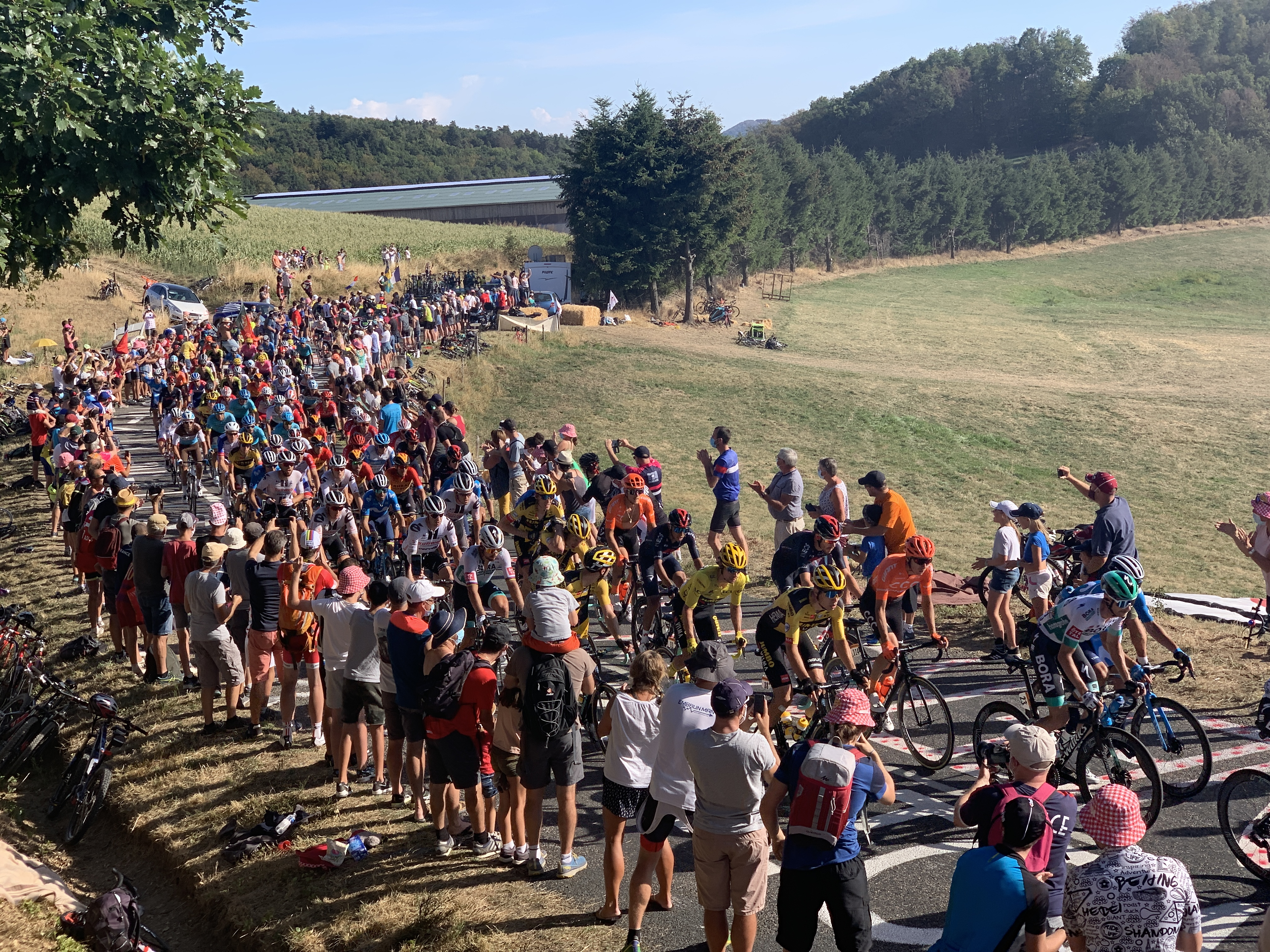

12 September 2020 – Clermont-Ferrand to Lyon, 194 km (121 mi)

Stefan Küng and Edward Theuns arranged a breakaway during this stage. Theuns was first at the intermediate sprint. Küng dropped Theuns and won eight mountain points on three climbs. The Swiss rider was caught with 82 kilometers left. Plenty of attacks had started inside 12 kilometers before the finish. In sequence Benoot, Madouas, Kämna, De Gendt, Alaphilippe, Hirschi, Sagan and Van Avermaet all attempted to escape from the bunch and win this stage. But it was Søren Kragh Andersen, who chose the right moment to attack in the last 3 kilometers. Luka Mezgec and Simone Consonni finished second and third from a bunch including all thevTour contenders. Peter Sagan was fourth and earned some points to put pressure on green jersey wearer Sam Bennett

Stage 14 Result
Rank	Rider	Team	Time
1	Søren Kragh Andersen (DEN)	Team Sunweb	4h 28' 10"
2	Luka Mezgec (SLO)	Mitchelton–Scott	+ 15"
3	Simone Consonni (ITA)	Cofidis	+ 15"
4	Peter Sagan (SVK)	Bora–Hansgrohe	+ 15"
5	Casper Pedersen (DEN)	Team Sunweb	+ 15"
6	Jasper Stuyven (BEL)	Trek–Segafredo	+ 15"
7	Matteo Trentin (ITA)	CCC Team	+ 15"
8	Oliver Naesen (BEL)	AG2R La Mondiale	+ 15"
9	Sonny Colbrelli (ITA)	Bahrain–McLaren	+ 15"
10	Marc Hirschi (SUI)	Team Sunweb	+ 15"

General classification after Stage 14
Rank	Rider	Team	Time
1	Primož Roglič (SLO)	Team Jumbo–Visma	61h 03' 00"
2	Tadej Pogačar (SLO)	UAE Team Emirates	+ 44"
3	Egan Bernal (COL)	INEOS Grenadiers	+ 59"
4	Rigoberto Urán (COL)	EF Pro Cycling	+ 1' 10"
5	Nairo Quintana (COL)	Arkéa–Samsic	+ 1' 12"
6	Miguel Ángel López (COL)	Astana	+ 1' 31"
7	Adam Yates (GBR)	Mitchelton–Scott	+ 1' 42"
8	Mikel Landa (ESP)	Bahrain–McLaren	+ 1' 55"
9	Richie Porte (AUS)	Trek–Segafredo	+ 2' 06"
10	Enric Mas (ESP)	Movistar Team	+ 2' 54"

== Stage 15 ==
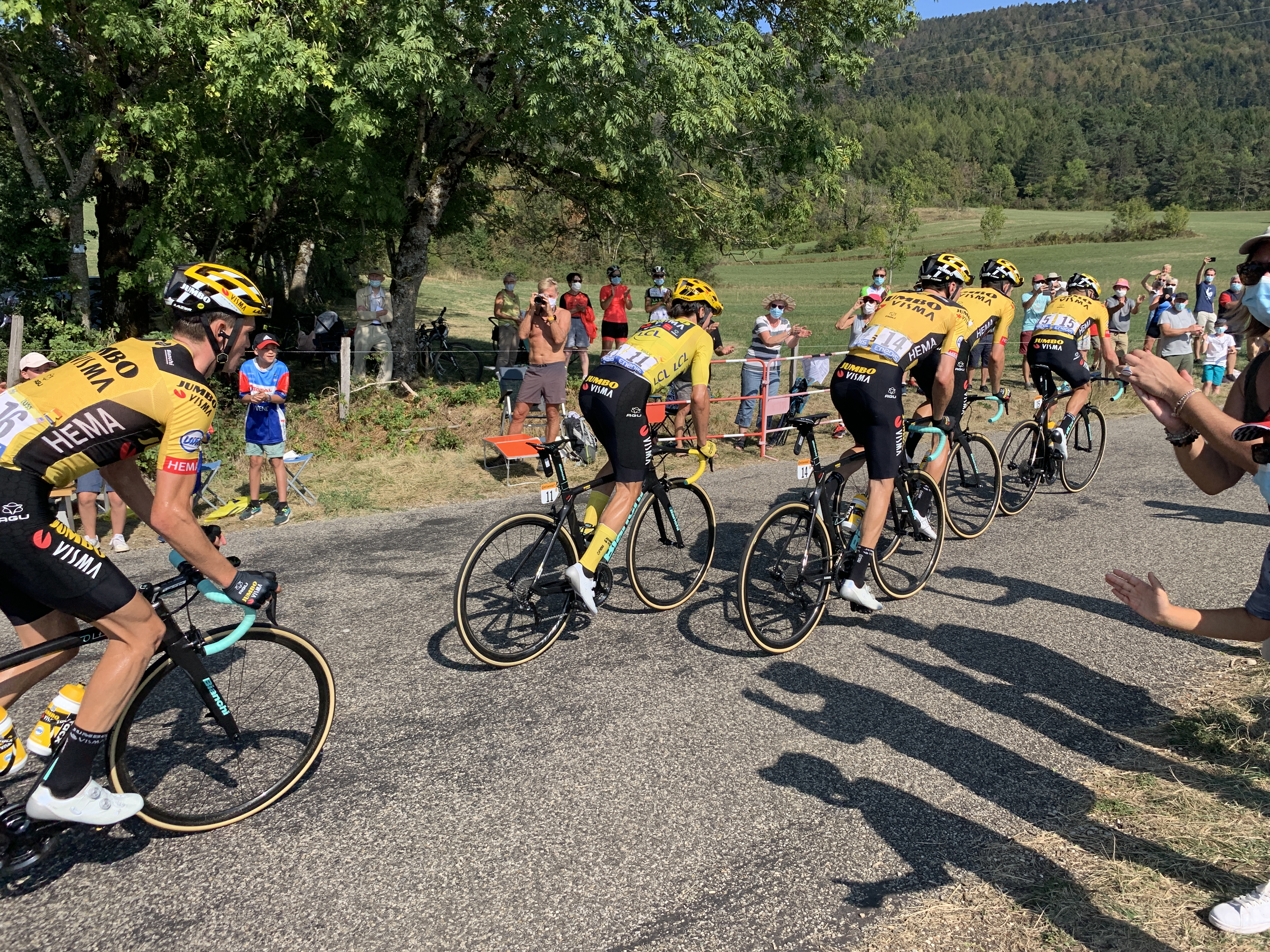

13 September 2020 – Lyon to Grand Colombier, 174.5 km (108.4 mi)

The race started with many attempting to form a breakaway but the presence of points classification contenders Peter Sagan and Sam Bennett prevented a successful move. Sergio Higuita abandoned the race after two early crashes. The definitive breakaway included Pierre Rolland, Simon Geschke, Marco Marcato, Matteo Trentin, Jesús Herrada, Michael Gogl, Niccolò Bonifazio and Kévin Ledanois. Trentin won the intermediate sprint. Herrada and Rolland won mountain point bonuses on two category 1 climbs. Rolland and Gogl were the last to be caught by the peloton at the foot of the final climb of the Grand Colombier. Egan Bernal, Nairo Quintana and Guillaume Martin were dropped early. A group of favourites led by Team Jumbo–Visma kept the strong pace. Adam Yates attacked with no effect. Cyclists restrained from another moves until the last kilometer. Richie Porte accelerated, Primož Roglič responded but Tadej Pogačar followed him and went for his second stage victory. Most of other favourites finished within 40 seconds. Caruso lost almost two minutes, Guillaume Martin and Quintana were more than three minutes late. Hopes for a sixth consecutive overall win for INEOS Grenadiers evaporated. Bernal finished seven minutes behind, Carapaz finished twenty minutes later.

Stage 15 Result
Rank	Rider	Team	Time
1	Tadej Pogačar (SLO)	UAE Team Emirates	4h 34' 13"
2	Primož Roglič (SLO)	Team Jumbo–Visma	+ 0"
3	Richie Porte (AUS)	Trek–Segafredo	+ 5"
4	Miguel Ángel López (COL)	Astana	+ 8"
5	Enric Mas (ESP)	Movistar Team	+ 15"
6	Sepp Kuss (USA)	Team Jumbo–Visma	+ 15"
7	Mikel Landa (ESP)	Bahrain–McLaren	+ 15"
8	Adam Yates (GBR)	Mitchelton–Scott	+ 15"
9	Rigoberto Urán (COL)	EF Pro Cycling	+ 18"
10	Alejandro Valverde (ESP)	Movistar Team	+ 24"

General classification after Stage 15
Rank	Rider	Team	Time
1	Primož Roglič (SLO)	Team Jumbo–Visma	65h 37' 07"
2	Tadej Pogačar (SLO)	UAE Team Emirates	+ 40"
3	Rigoberto Urán (COL)	EF Pro Cycling	+ 1' 34"
4	Miguel Ángel López (COL)	Astana	+ 1' 45"
5	Adam Yates (GBR)	Mitchelton–Scott	+ 2' 03"
6	Richie Porte (AUS)	Trek–Segafredo	+ 2' 13"
7	Mikel Landa (ESP)	Bahrain–McLaren	+ 2' 16"
8	Enric Mas (ESP)	Movistar Team	+ 3' 15"
9	Nairo Quintana (COL)	Arkéa–Samsic	+ 5' 08"
10	Tom Dumoulin (NED)	Team Jumbo–Visma	+ 5' 12"

== Rest day 2 ==
14 September 2020 – Isère

== Stage 16 ==
15 September 2020 – La Tour-du-Pin to Villard-de-Lans, 164 km (102 mi)

Stage 16 Result
Rank	Rider	Team	Time
1	Lennard Kämna (GER)	Bora–Hansgrohe	4h 12' 52"
2	Richard Carapaz (ECU)	INEOS Grenadiers	+ 1' 27"
3	Sébastien Reichenbach (SUI)	Groupama–FDJ	+ 1' 56"
4	Pavel Sivakov (RUS)	INEOS Grenadiers	+ 2' 34"
5	Simon Geschke (GER)	CCC Team	+ 2' 35"
6	Warren Barguil (FRA)	Arkéa–Samsic	+ 2' 37"
7	Tiesj Benoot (BEL)	Team Sunweb	+ 2' 41"
8	Nicolas Roche (IRL)	Team Sunweb	+ 2' 47"
9	Quentin Pacher (FRA)	B&B Hotels–Vital Concept	+ 2' 51"
10	Julian Alaphilippe (FRA)	Deceuninck–Quick-Step	+ 2' 54"

General classification after Stage 16
Rank	Rider	Team	Time
1	Primož Roglič (SLO)	Team Jumbo–Visma	70h 06' 47"
2	Tadej Pogačar (SLO)	UAE Team Emirates	+ 40"
3	Rigoberto Urán (COL)	EF Pro Cycling	+ 1' 34"
4	Miguel Ángel López (COL)	Astana	+ 1' 45"
5	Adam Yates (GBR)	Mitchelton–Scott	+ 2' 03"
6	Richie Porte (AUS)	Trek–Segafredo	+ 2' 13"
7	Mikel Landa (ESP)	Bahrain–McLaren	+ 2' 16"
8	Enric Mas (ESP)	Movistar Team	+ 3' 15"
9	Tom Dumoulin (NED)	Team Jumbo–Visma	+ 5' 19"
10	Nairo Quintana (COL)	Arkéa–Samsic	+ 5' 43"

== Stage 17 ==
16 September 2020 – Grenoble to Méribel (Col de la Loze), 170 km (110 mi)

Dubbed the "Queen Stage" for this year's tour, this stage features two Hors catégorie climbs, the Col de la Madeleine with a height of 2000 m and the Col de la Loze at 2304 m. The latter was being used for the first time on the Tour and was the finish line for this stage. Prior to the race, defending champion Egan Bernal announced that he was abandoning the race.

During the start of the race, five riders started to break away from the main peloton, led by Julian Alaphilippe and Richard Carapaz. At the sprint point, green jersey leader Sam Bennett got ahead of Peter Sagan, adding two points to his lead. On the first climb, Carapaz won over Alaphilippe, both increasing their points but still behind King of the Mountains jersey leader Benoît Cosnefroy. Tadej Pogačar secured third place on the summit while in the yellow jersey group. Because of the fast pace being set by the Team Bahrain McLaren, all of the stage leaders except Carapaz were caught up by the yellow jersey group. While ascending Col de la Loze, yellow jersey leader Primož Roglič and teammate Sepp Kuss, white jersey leader Pogačar, Miguel Ángel López, and Richie Porte were the remaining cyclists from the yellow jersey group, leaving the rest of the leaders' group behind. Carapaz was eventually caught up near the 24% gradient part (the steepest section) of the ascent while Lopez and Kuss went ahead. GC leaders Roglič and Pogačar tried to chase Lopez, but in the end, Lopez emerged as the winner of the stage and climbed to third place in the general classification. As the stage with the highest climb, Lopez also won the Souvenir Henri Desgrange award. Roglič still retained the yellow jersey, while Pogačar got the KoM jersey from Cosnefroy while still retaining the young rider jersey, but his gap from Roglič ballooned to 57 seconds. Bennett retained the green jersey. Alaphilippe won the combativity award for the stage.

Aside from Bernal, Mikel Nieve left the race, the first time he abandoned a Grand Tour.

Stage 17 Result
Rank	Rider	Team	Time
1	Miguel Ángel López (COL)	Astana	4h 49' 08"
2	Primož Roglič (SLO)	Team Jumbo–Visma	+ 15"
3	Tadej Pogačar (SLO)	UAE Team Emirates	+ 30"
4	Sepp Kuss (USA)	Team Jumbo–Visma	+ 56"
5	Richie Porte (AUS)	Trek–Segafredo	+ 1' 01"
6	Enric Mas (ESP)	Movistar Team	+ 1' 12"
7	Mikel Landa (ESP)	Bahrain–McLaren	+ 1' 20"
8	Adam Yates (GBR)	Mitchelton–Scott	+ 1' 20"
9	Rigoberto Urán (COL)	EF Pro Cycling	+ 1' 59"
10	Tom Dumoulin (NED)	Team Jumbo–Visma	+ 2' 13"

General classification after Stage 17
Rank	Rider	Team	Time
1	Primož Roglič (SLO)	Team Jumbo–Visma	74h 56' 04"
2	Tadej Pogačar (SLO)	UAE Team Emirates	+ 57"
3	Miguel Ángel López (COL)	Astana	+ 1' 26"
4	Richie Porte (AUS)	Trek–Segafredo	+ 3' 05"
5	Adam Yates (GBR)	Mitchelton–Scott	+ 3' 14"
6	Rigoberto Urán (COL)	EF Pro Cycling	+ 3' 24"
7	Mikel Landa (ESP)	Bahrain–McLaren	+ 3' 27"
8	Enric Mas (ESP)	Movistar Team	+ 4' 18"
9	Tom Dumoulin (NED)	Team Jumbo–Visma	+ 7' 23"
10	Alejandro Valverde (ESP)	Movistar Team	+ 9' 31"

== Stage 18 ==
17 September 2020 – Méribel to La Roche-sur-Foron, 175 km (109 mi)

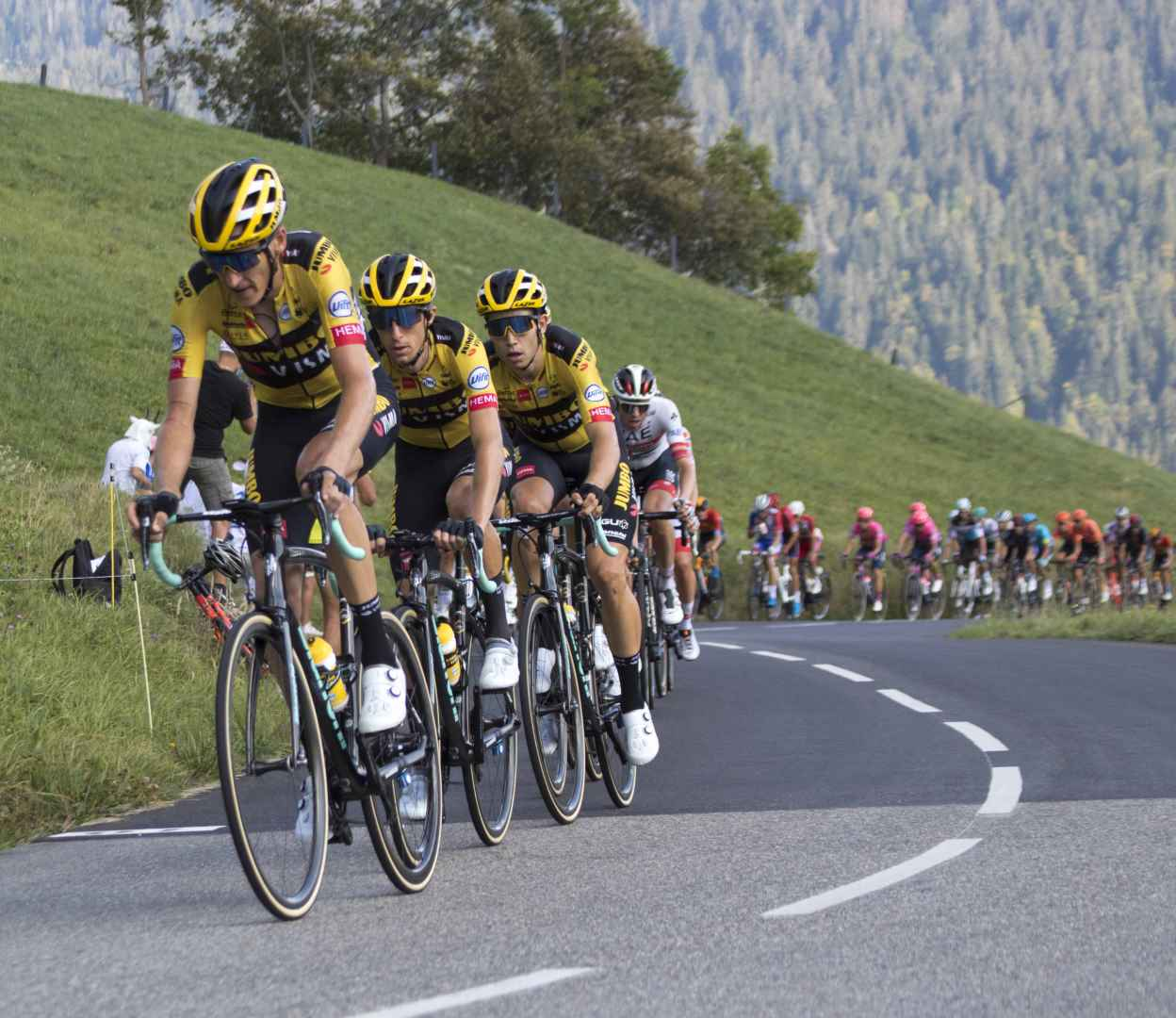
Team Jumbo–Visma lead the peloton on Stage 18.

With the stage featuring the shortest distance to the intermediate sprint point (14km after start), green jersey leader Sam Bennett and Peter Sagan, along with 30 other cyclists battled it out. Bennett edged Sagan by finishing first and third respectively; hence adding five more points to his lead.

After the sprint, the rest of the course featured five mountain classification climbs with the following order: Category 1 Cormet de Roselend, Category 3 Côte de la route des Villes, Category 2 Col des Saisies, Category 1 Col des Aravis, and the Hors catégorie Glières Plateau. With 47 points maximum up for grabs for the King of the Mountains (KoM) jersey for this stage and with several cyclists within 30 points of the current KoM leader Tadej Pogačar, cyclists who planned on getting the jersey made the attack. For the first two climbs, Marc Hirschi went ahead of Richard Carapaz, but Hirschi crashed while descending after the Col des Saisies, leaving Carapaz, teammate Michał Kwiatkowski, and Pello Bilbao as race leaders. On the climb to Glieres Plateau, Mikel Landa tried to distance away from the yellow jersey group, but was soon caught up before reaching the summit, while dropping top 10 cyclists Adam Yates, Rigoberto Urán, and Alejandro Valverde. Richie Porte got a flat tire while traversing the gravel section of the Glieres Plateau, losing at most 40 seconds in the process, but was able to catch up with the yellow jersey group. Hirschi and Bilbao also got caught up with the yellow jersey group, while Kwiatkowski and Carapaz, who placed first on the final two climbs, cruised at the front, giving a 1-2 finish for the Ineos Grenadiers team.

Kwiatkowski won the stage, marking the first time he had won an individual stage on a Grand Tour. Carapaz won the KoM jersey from Pogačar. With his effort on today's stage, Hirschi won the combativity award. André Greipel called it quits for the tour.

Stage 18 Result
Rank	Rider	Team	Time
1	Michał Kwiatkowski (POL)	INEOS Grenadiers	4h 47' 33"
2	Richard Carapaz (ECU)	INEOS Grenadiers	+ 0"
3	Wout van Aert (BEL)	Team Jumbo–Visma	+ 1' 51"
4	Primož Roglič (SLO)	Team Jumbo–Visma	+ 1' 53"
5	Tadej Pogačar (SLO)	UAE Team Emirates	+ 1' 53"
6	Richie Porte (AUS)	Trek–Segafredo	+ 1' 54"
7	Enric Mas (ESP)	Movistar Team	+ 1' 54"
8	Mikel Landa (ESP)	Bahrain–McLaren	+ 1' 54"
9	Damiano Caruso (ITA)	Bahrain–McLaren	+ 1' 54"
10	Tom Dumoulin (NED)	Team Jumbo–Visma	+ 1' 54"

General classification after Stage 18
Rank	Rider	Team	Time
1	Primož Roglič (SLO)	Team Jumbo–Visma	79h 45' 30"
2	Tadej Pogačar (SLO)	UAE Team Emirates	+ 57"
3	Miguel Ángel López (COL)	Astana	+ 1' 27"
4	Richie Porte (AUS)	Trek–Segafredo	+ 3' 06"
5	Mikel Landa (ESP)	Bahrain–McLaren	+ 3' 28"
6	Enric Mas (ESP)	Movistar Team	+ 4' 19"
7	Adam Yates (GBR)	Mitchelton–Scott	+ 5' 55"
8	Rigoberto Urán (COL)	EF Pro Cycling	+ 6' 05"
9	Tom Dumoulin (NED)	Team Jumbo–Visma	+ 7' 24"
10	Alejandro Valverde (ESP)	Movistar Team	+ 12' 12"

== Stage 19 ==
18 September 2020 – Bourg-en-Bresse to Champagnole, 166.5 km (103.5 mi)

Stage 19 Result
Rank	Rider	Team	Time
1	Søren Kragh Andersen (DEN)	Team Sunweb	3h 36' 33"
2	Luka Mezgec (SLO)	Mitchelton–Scott	+ 53"
3	Jasper Stuyven (BEL)	Trek–Segafredo	+ 53"
4	Greg van Avermaet (BEL)	CCC Team	+ 53"
5	Oliver Naesen (BEL)	AG2R La Mondiale	+ 53"
6	Nikias Arndt (GER)	Team Sunweb	+ 53"
7	Luke Rowe (GBR)	INEOS Grenadiers	+ 59"
8	Sam Bennett (IRL)	Deceuninck–Quick-Step	+ 1' 02"
9	Peter Sagan (SVK)	Bora–Hansgrohe	+ 1' 02"
10	Matteo Trentin (ITA)	CCC Team	+ 1' 02"

General classification after Stage 19
Rank	Rider	Team	Time
1	Primož Roglič (SLO)	Team Jumbo–Visma	83h 29' 41"
2	Tadej Pogačar (SLO)	UAE Team Emirates	+ 57"
3	Miguel Ángel López (COL)	Astana	+ 1' 27"
4	Richie Porte (AUS)	Trek–Segafredo	+ 3' 06"
5	Mikel Landa (ESP)	Bahrain–McLaren	+ 3' 28"
6	Enric Mas (ESP)	Movistar Team	+ 4' 19"
7	Adam Yates (GBR)	Mitchelton–Scott	+ 5' 55"
8	Rigoberto Urán (COL)	EF Pro Cycling	+ 6' 05"
9	Tom Dumoulin (NED)	Team Jumbo–Visma	+ 7' 24"
10	Alejandro Valverde (ESP)	Movistar Team	+ 12' 12"

== Stage 20 ==
19 September 2020 – Lure to La Planche des Belles Filles, 36.2 km (22.5 mi) (ITT)

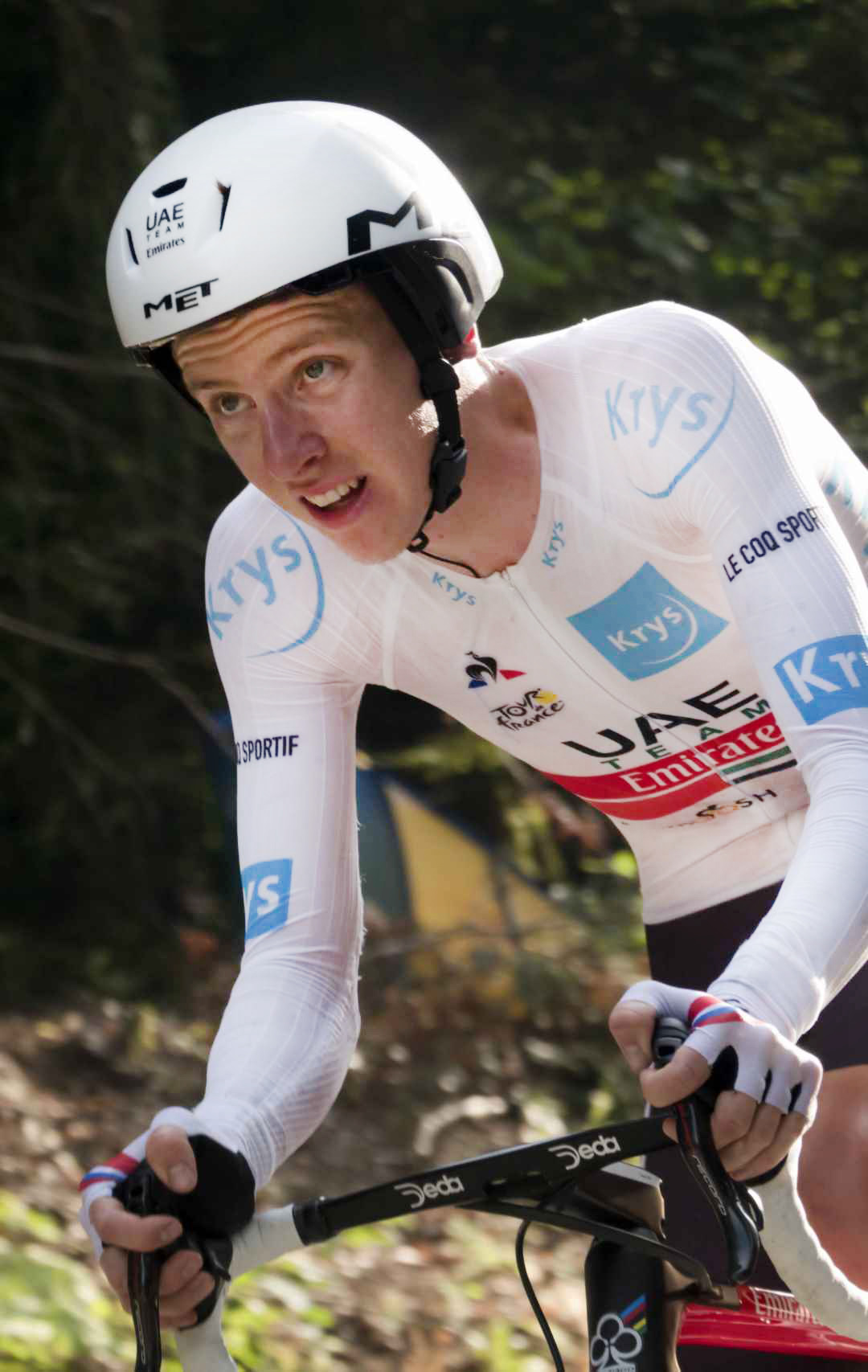
Tadej Pogačar, winner of stage 20

The penultimate stage of the tour was an individual time trial and it featured a Category 1 climb at the end of the stage, with the last portion of the climb having a 20% gradient. Because of this, aside from the yellow jersey (in which Primož Roglič had less than a minute lead over compatriot Tadej Pogačar), the king of the mountains (KoM) jersey was also up for grabs (Richard Carapaz had a 2-point edge over Pogačar).

The stage started with Rémi Cavagna finishing the individual time trial at a faster time with most of the cyclists prior to the final 20 cyclists. Subsequently, two Team Jumbo–Visma teammates were faster than Cavagna, Wout van Aert by almost 30", and Tom Dumoulin, 10" faster than van Aert. Carapaz started slow on the stage in preparation for his jersey defense but was not able to get any points after the stage concluded. Pogačar was slowly chipping away Roglič's lead on the first and second checkpoints, and on the climb, Pogačar was able to overturn the deficit, besting Roglič by almost two minutes. He also became the stage winner while Roglič finished fifth. Since Pogačar climbed the fastest, he also won the KoM jersey over Carapaz. Sam Bennett still owned the green jersey despite not finishing in the top 10.

Stage 20 Result
Rank	Rider	Team	Time
1	Tadej Pogačar (SLO)	UAE Team Emirates	55' 55"
2	Tom Dumoulin (NED)	Team Jumbo–Visma	+ 1' 21"
3	Richie Porte (AUS)	Trek–Segafredo	+ 1' 21"
4	Wout van Aert (BEL)	Team Jumbo–Visma	+ 1' 31"
5	Primož Roglič (SLO)	Team Jumbo–Visma	+ 1' 56"
6	Rémi Cavagna (FRA)	Deceuninck–Quick-Step	+ 1' 59"
7	Damiano Caruso (ITA)	Bahrain–McLaren	+ 2' 29"
8	David de la Cruz (ESP)	UAE Team Emirates	+ 2' 40"
9	Enric Mas (ESP)	Movistar Team	+ 2' 45"
10	Rigoberto Urán (COL)	EF Pro Cycling	+ 2' 54"

General classification after Stage 20
Rank	Rider	Team	Time
1	Tadej Pogačar (SLO)	UAE Team Emirates	84h 26' 33"
2	Primož Roglič (SLO)	Team Jumbo–Visma	+ 59"
3	Richie Porte (AUS)	Trek–Segafredo	+ 3' 30"
4	Mikel Landa (ESP)	Bahrain–McLaren	+ 5' 58"
5	Enric Mas (ESP)	Movistar Team	+ 6' 07"
6	Miguel Ángel López (COL)	Astana	+ 6' 47"
7	Tom Dumoulin (NED)	Team Jumbo–Visma	+ 7' 48"
8	Rigoberto Urán (COL)	EF Pro Cycling	+ 8' 02"
9	Adam Yates (GBR)	Mitchelton–Scott	+ 9' 25"
10	Damiano Caruso (ITA)	Bahrain–McLaren	+ 14' 03"

== Stage 21 ==
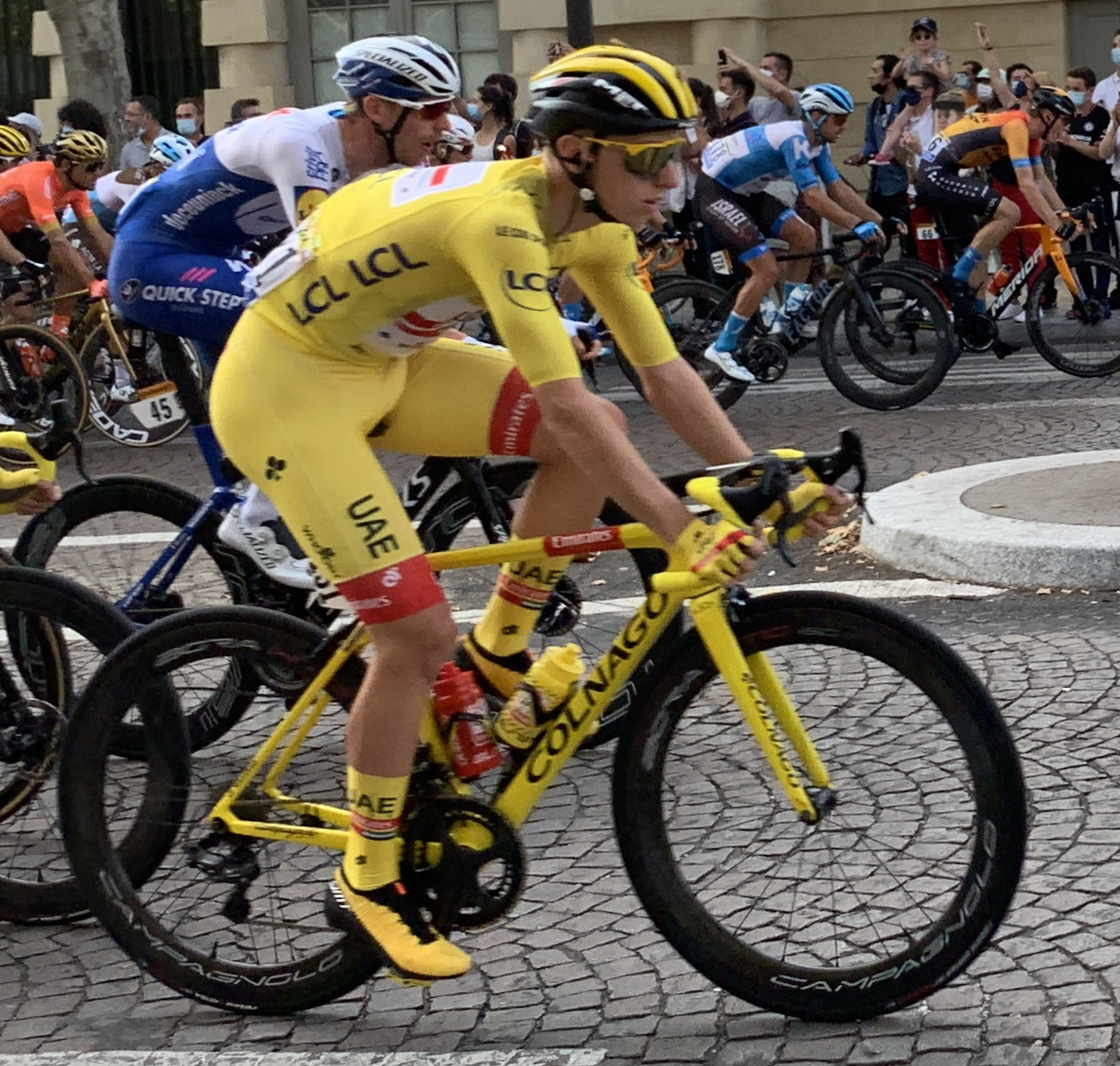
Tadej Pogačar

20 September 2020 – Mantes-la-Jolie to Paris (Champs-Élysées), 122 km (76 mi)

Stage 21 Result
Rank	Rider	Team	Time
1	Sam Bennett (IRL)	Deceuninck–Quick-Step	2h 53' 32"
2	Mads Pedersen (DEN)	Trek–Segafredo	+ 0"
3	Peter Sagan (SVK)	Bora–Hansgrohe	+ 0"
4	Alexander Kristoff (NOR)	UAE Team Emirates	+ 0"
5	Elia Viviani (ITA)	Cofidis	+ 0"
6	Wout van Aert (BEL)	Team Jumbo–Visma	+ 0"
7	Caleb Ewan (AUS)	Lotto–Soudal	+ 0"
8	Hugo Hofstetter (FRA)	Israel Start-Up Nation	+ 0"
9	Bryan Coquard (FRA)	B&B Hotels–Vital Concept	+ 0"
10	Max Walscheid (GER)	NTT Pro Cycling	+ 0"

General classification after Stage 21
Rank	Rider	Team	Time
1	Tadej Pogačar (SLO)	UAE Team Emirates	87h 20' 05"
2	Primož Roglič (SLO)	Team Jumbo–Visma	+ 59"
3	Richie Porte (AUS)	Trek–Segafredo	+ 3' 30"
4	Mikel Landa (ESP)	Bahrain–McLaren	+ 5' 58"
5	Enric Mas (ESP)	Movistar Team	+ 6' 07"
6	Miguel Ángel López (COL)	Astana	+ 6' 47"
7	Tom Dumoulin (NED)	Team Jumbo–Visma	+ 7' 48"
8	Rigoberto Urán (COL)	EF Pro Cycling	+ 8' 02"
9	Adam Yates (GBR)	Mitchelton–Scott	+ 9' 25"
10	Damiano Caruso (ITA)	Bahrain–McLaren	+ 14' 03"
