= Col de la Loze =

Mountain pass in the French Alps

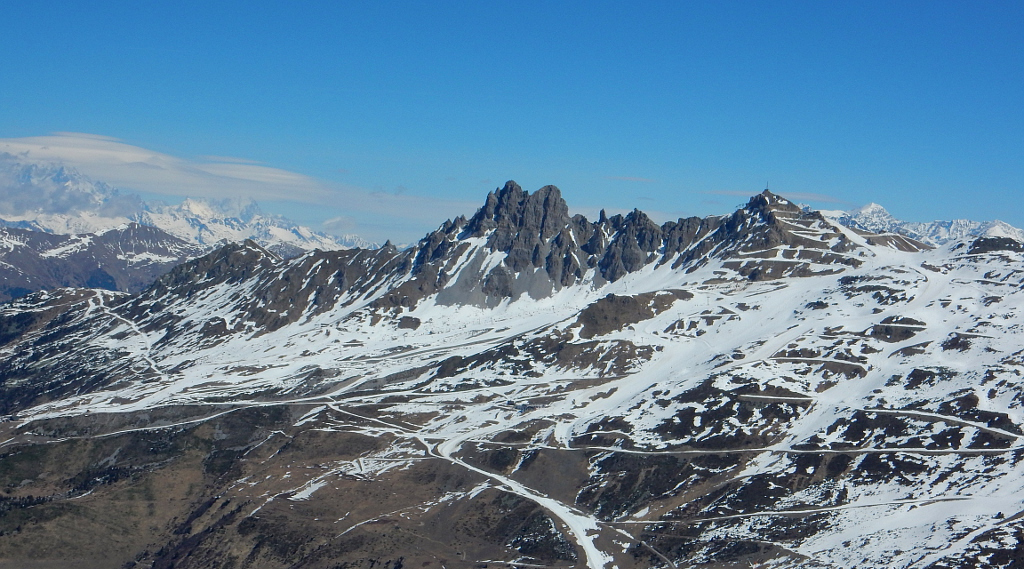

Highest point
- Elevation: 2,304 m (7,559 ft)
- Coordinates: 45°24′18″N 6°36′07″E

Geography
- Location within Alps
- Location: Savoie, France
- Parent range: French Alps

The Col de la Loze is a mountain pass in the French Alps, with an elevation of 2,304 metres (7,559 ft). A path up the mountain was opened in May 2019, and is the seventh-highest mountain pass in France. The ascent featured in the 2020, 2023, and 2025 Tours de France, as well as in the 2019 Tour de l'Avenir.

== Geography ==
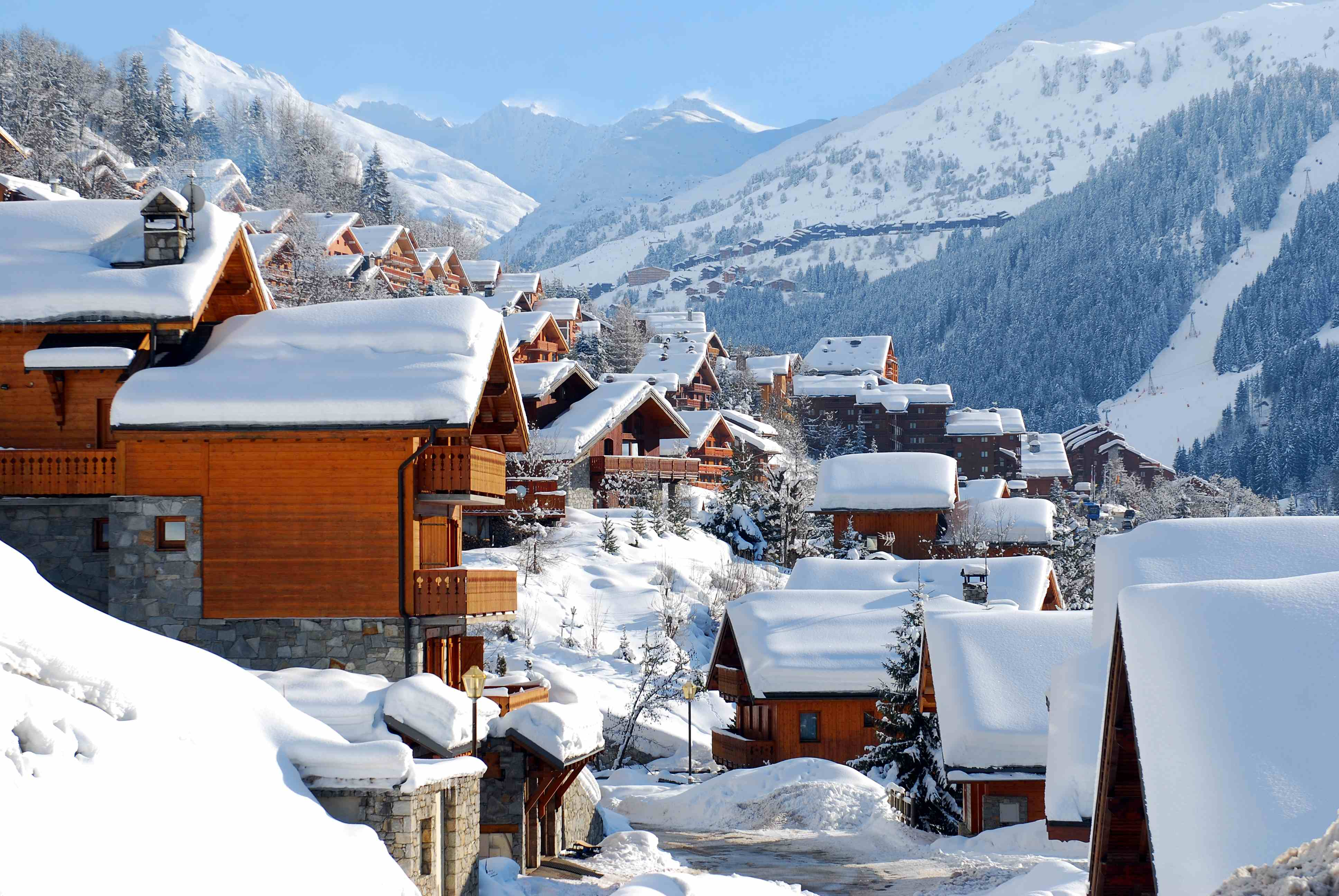
Méribel is a village on the Col de la Loze mountain pass.

Col de la Loze is in Les Trois Vallées, at an elevation of 2,304 metres (7,559 ft). From Col de la Loze, one can ski to the nearby La Tania, and Le Praz. By chairlift, one can get from Col de la Loze to Courchevel and Méribel, and by button lift, one can get to La Tania. From Col de la Loze, one can also cycle to Lac Bleu.

A path up the Col de la Loze was built in 2018 and was officially opened on 12 May 2019. On the official opening day, there was still snow on the mountain, and it was the first French mountain pass to be cleared of snow. Motor vehicles are not permitted on the path. The path is paved on the side toward Courchevel. The path links Col de la Loze to Courchevel, and in 2020 was paved on the side to Méribel. There are future plans to continue the path to Val Thorens. It is the seventh-highest mountain pass in France, and the third-highest mountain pass in the Savoie region.

== Cycling ==
While there are multiple routes to get to the Col de la Loze, the climb through Meribel is the most notorious, and at 14.1 FIETS is the hardest bike climb in France. The climb averages a 7.5% gradient for 22.6 kilometres (14.0 mi) gaining nearly 1700 metres.

On 12 May 2019, the Col de la Loze held the Eiffage time trial event to commemorate its opening. There were 2 races: one over a distance of 22.7 kilometres (14.1 mi), and one over a shorter distance of 8.6 kilometres (5.3 mi).

The first professional cycle race to ascend to Col de la Loze was stage 8 of the 2019 Tour de l'Avenir. The stage was won by Australia's Alexander Evans.

=== Appearances in Tour de France ===
Col de la Loze was the summit finish for stage 17 of the 2020 Tour de France, which was won by Colombian rider Miguel Ángel López. The stage included an ascent of the Col de la Madeleine, which was not in the Tour de l'Avenir stage. The climb up to Col de la Loze was 21.5 kilometres (13.4 mi) long, with an average gradient of 7.5% and a maximum gradient of 24%. The route followed the former path of a 7 kilometres (4.3 mi) ski lift access road used by mechanics. The ascent started in Brides-les-Bains and passed through Méribel, before turning onto the new path up to Col de la Loze. The finish point was the highest point of the 2020 Tour. Col de la Loze was one of two new summit finishes at the Tour, the other one being Grand Colombier. It featured again in the 2023 edition, with the finish taking place at the Courchevel Altiport, and next appeared in the 2025 Tour de France, being won by Ben O'Connor.

| Year | Stage | Category | Start | Finish | Leader at the summit |
|---|---|---|---|---|---|
| 2020 | 17 | HC | Grenoble | Méribel (Col de la Loze) | Miguel Ángel López (COL) |
| 2023 | 17 | HC | Saint-Gervais-les-Bains | Courchevel | Felix Gall (AUT) |
| 2025 | 18 | HC | Vif | Courchevel (Col de la Loze) | Ben O'Connor (AUS) |
