= Alex Evans =

Alex Evans may refer to:

- Alex Evans (baseball) (born 1897), American Negro league baseball player
- Alex Evans (cricketer) (born 2000), English cricketer
- Alex Evans (rugby union), Australian rugby union coach
- Alex Evans (video game developer), English video game developer and co-founder of Media Molecule
- Alex Evans (model) (born 1989), British fashion model and winner of Britain's Next Top Model, Cycle 4
- Alex Evans (cyclist) (born 1997), Australian road cyclist
- Alex Evans, bass guitarist and songwriter with top 20 band Moke (British band)

== See also ==
- Alexander Evans (disambiguation)
