= 2019 Tour de l'Avenir =

2019 edition of the Tour de l'Avenir

Race details
- Dates: 15 August 2019 – 25 August 2019
- Stages: 10
- Distance: 1,036.2 km (643.9 mi)

Results
	Winner	Tobias Foss (Norway)
	Second	Giovanni Aleotti (Italy)
	Third	Ilan Van Wilder (Belgium)
	Points	Matteo Jorgenson (USA)
	Mountains	Jon Agirre (Spain)

The 2019 Tour de l'Avenir was the 56th edition of the Tour de l'Avenir, a UCI 2.NCup stage race for riders aged 23 or younger. The 1,036.2-kilometre (643.9 mi) race consisted of 10 stages. It started on 15 August in Marmande and concluded on 25 August in La Corbière, with Norwegian Tobias Foss winning the general classification.

== Race overview ==
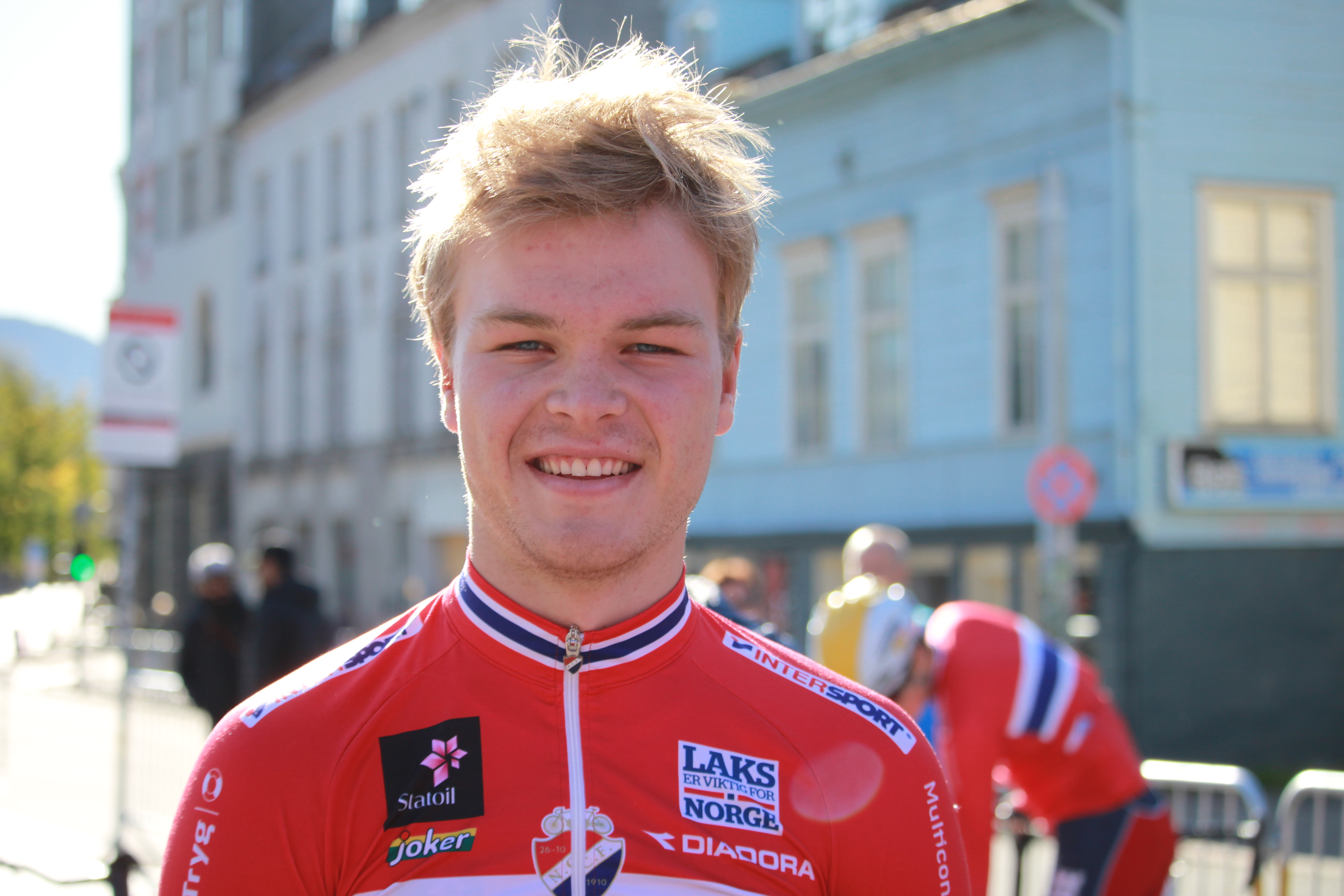
Tobias Foss won the general classification at the race.

A total of 153 riders, from 26 teams participated in the race. There were 23 national teams, two regional teams, and one international team. The Canadian team competed at the event for the first time in eight years. The event consisted of mostly hilly and mountainous stages, with one rest day between stages 6 and 7. Stage 2 of the race was a team time trial.

British rider Ethan Hayter won stage 3, before withdrawing from the race after breaking his collarbone on the fourth stage. Fellow British cyclist Fred Wright won the fourth stage. Ben Healy won the fifth stage, after he broke away from Morten Hulgaard and Matteo Jorgenson around 4 kilometres (2.5 mi) from the stage finish. Healy is an Irish rider, who was competing for the International team. Swiss cyclist Stefan Bissegger won the sixth stage. Briton Tom Pidcock withdrew from the race after crashing within the final 1 kilometre (0.62 mi) of the stage. Stage 8 of the race included an ascent of the Col de la Loze, the seventh highest mountain pass in France. It was the first time that the mountain had been part of a professional cycle race. The route up the Col de la Loze started in the valley and involved a direct descent of the mountain. The stage was won by Australia's Alexander Evans. Hungary's Attila Valter won the ninth stage despite momentarily going the wrong way near to the finish. Going into Stage 10, Norway's Tobias Foss held a lead of 1:10. He managed to hold onto his race lead, finishing seventh at the summit of Le Corbier.

== Route and stages ==
Stage characteristics and winners
Stage	Date	Course	Distance	Type	Winner
1	15 August	Marmande to Marmande	128.8 km (80 mi)	Flat stage	Mathias Norsgaard (DEN)
2	16 August	Eymet to Bergerac	32.1 km (20 mi)	Team time trial	Switzerland (SUI)
3	17 August	Montignac to Mauriac	162.3 km (101 mi)	Hilly stage	Ethan Hayter (GBR)
4	18 August	Mauriac to Espalion	158.2 km (98 mi)	Hilly stage	Fred Wright (GBR)
5	19 August	Espalion to Saint-Julien-Chapteuil	158.9 km (99 mi)	Hilly stage	Ben Healy (IRE)
6	20 August	Saint-Julien-Chapteuil to Privas	124.0 km (77 mi)	Hilly stage	Stefan Bissegger (SUI)
	21 August			Rest day	
7	22 August	Grésy-sur-Isère to La Giettaz	103.8 km (64 mi)	Mountain stage	Harold Tejada (COL)
8	23 August	Brides-les-Bains to Col de la Loze	23.1 km (14 mi)	Mountain stage	Alexander Evans (AUS)
9	24 August	Villaroger to Tignes	67.2 km (42 mi)	Mountain stage	Attila Valter (HUN)
10	25 August	Saint-Colomban-des-Villards to Le Corbier	78.1 km (49 mi)	Mountain stage	Jefferson Cepeda (ECU)

== Classifications ==
Norwegian cyclist Tobias Foss won the general classification, ahead of Italian Giovanni Aleotti, and Belgian Ilan Van Wilder. Foss was the first Norwegian to win the race. American cyclist Matteo Jorgenson won the points classification, ahead of Foss and Mathias Norsgaard. Spanish rider Jon Agirre won the mountains classification ahead of Alexander Evans and Michel Ries.
