= Fernand Lamy =

French composer

Fernand Lamy (8 April 1881 – 18 September 1966) was a French composer, music teacher, conductor and choral conductor.

== Life ==
Born in Chauvigny, Lamy was a disciple and friend of Guy Ropartz. He has written reference works on this composer. He has notably collaborated in the review L'Harmonie du monde. He started his career working on military music. He was later choir conductor and then conductor of the Théâtre des Champs-Élysées. He conducted Russian ballets and worked with Gabriel Astruc. He then worked at the Valenciennes conservatory, of which he was the director, and founded in particular the Association des concerts symphoniques and the Société de musique de chambre. His students include Robert Lannoy, Jean Bertrand and Roberto Benzi. His son is the pianist and organist Jacques Lamy.
