= Marcelle Villin =

French composer and organist (1921–2022)

Marcelle Henriette Marie Villin (8 May 1921 – 29 March 2022) was a French composer and organist who published her music under the name "Marcelle Villin."

== Biography ==
Marcelle Henriette Marie Villin was born in Plomion. She studied music at the Conservatoire de Lille with Kara Chatteley and Edmond Gaujac, and received the Conservatoire's First Prize. Villin later studied at the Collegium Musicum de France and gave organ recitals throughout the United States and France. She was the organist at Sacre Coeur Church in Antibes.

Villin's music has been published by Editions Musicales Transatlantiques, Gerard Billaudot and Henry Lemoine. She died on 29 March 2022, at the age of 100. Her works include:

== Chamber ==
- Badinage (violin and piano)
- Chant d'Amour Mystique (violin and organ)
- Dans ta Demeur, Seigneur (violin and organ)
- Extrait Tuerkesse (violin and piano)
- Lui et Elle (violin and piano)
- Nos Ames s'Elancent vers Toi, Seigneur Jesus (violin and piano or organ)

== Piano/Organ ==
- Adoration pour une Nuit de Noel (organ)
- Alors se Dressant, Il Commanda au Vent et a la Mer
- Attente
- Elle Court la Micheline
- En ce Lieu Savage (etude for left hand)
- (L')Espiegle Jongleur
- Esquisses de Vacances
- Evocations
- Fantaisie
- Gyoniam Ipsi Consolabuntur
- Heures Sylvestres
- Loins dans la Montagne
- Marche Funebre
- Marche Romaine
- Meditation Devant un Crucifix (organ)
- Mon Chien et Moi
- Prelude
- Quatuor s'Amuse
- Scherzo
- Sonate de Noel
- Sunt Unum, Melodie pour un Marriage
- Theatre d'Enfants, Theme and Variations
- Trois Pieces

== Theater ==
- Les Fourberies de Scapin (text by Molière)

== Vocal ==
- Annonce de Pacques (bass solo and chorus)
- Au Christ-roi (cantata; bass solo, tenor solo and chorus)
- Ave Maria
- Cantum Ergo (chorus and organ)
- Chant d'Allegresse pour l'Ascension (chorus)
- Deux Melodies (children's chorus)
- Dormeuse (lullaby)
- Hymne a St. Jeanne d'Arc
- Je Crois en Dieu (chorus)
- Je Vous Salue Marie (children's chorus)
- Jesus en sa Creche (chorus, children's voices and organ)
- Kyrie Eleison (chorus)
- O Navire Immobile
- Pater Noster (bass solo, violin and organ)
- Pres d'un Etang (voice and piano)
- Six Melodies
- Tendre Invocations au Sacre Coeur (bass solo and chorus)
