= Jacques Lamy =

French musician

Jacques Lamy is a French pianist, composer and organist.

== Life ==
Jacques Lamy, son of composer Fernand Lamy is a French pianist and organist. He has been Director of the Henri Duparc Conservatory of Tarbes.

== Bibliography ==
- Trois silhouettes du grand siècle, pour la mémoire des Couperin, Paris, Philippo & Combre, 1975.
- Toccatina en ré majeur pour piano, Paris, Phillo, 1971.
- Deux pièces dans un style ancien pour piano, Paris, Philippo et Combre, 1971.
