= Chauvigny =

Chauvigny Chôvigni (Poitevin–Saintongeais)
- Commune
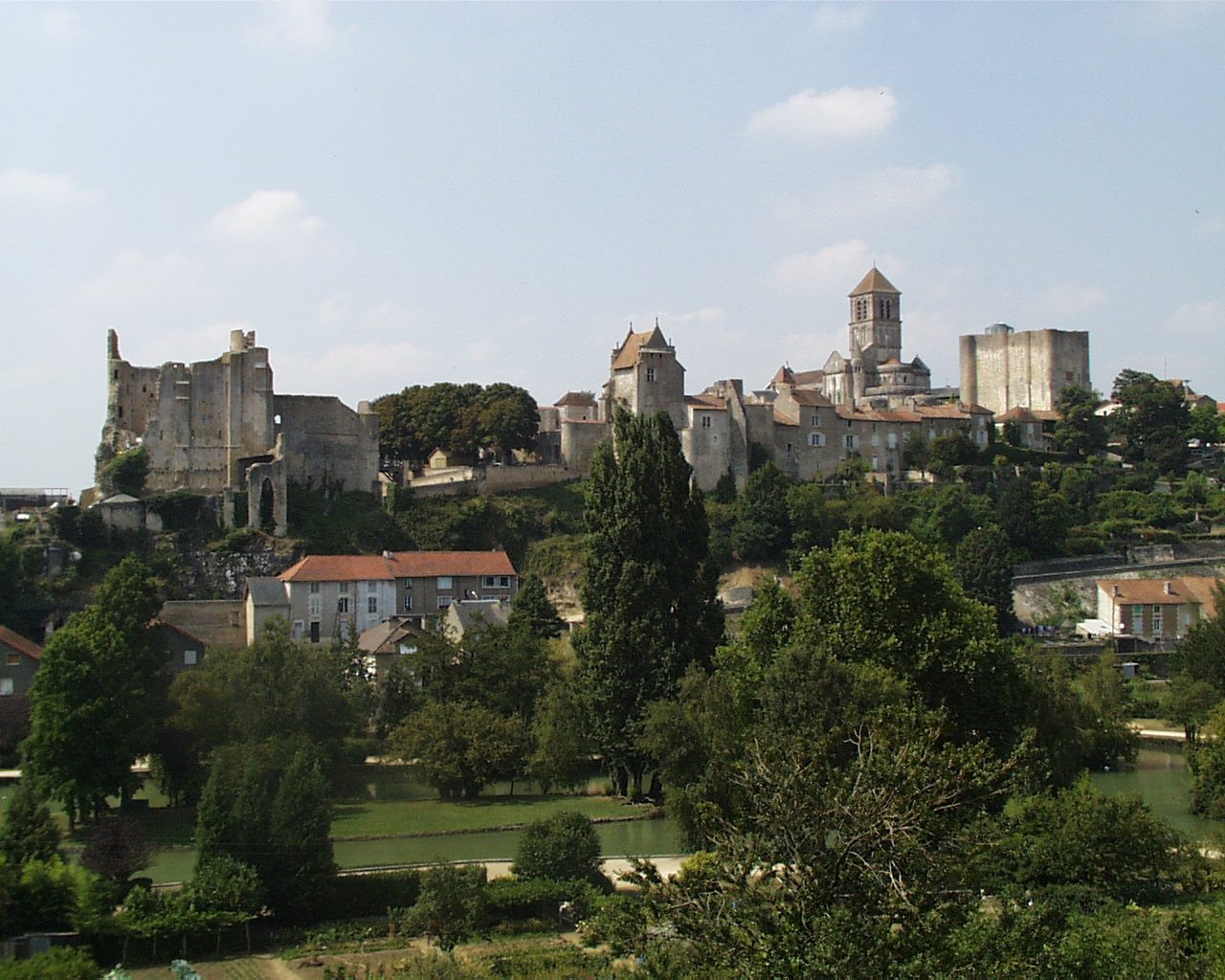
- A general view of Chauvigny

- Coat of arms
- Location of Chauvigny
- Location within France Location within Nouvelle-Aquitaine
- Coordinates: 46°34′10″N 0°38′51″E
- Country: France
- Region: Nouvelle-Aquitaine
- Department: Vienne
- Arrondissement: Montmorillon
- Canton: Chauvigny
- Intercommunality: CU Grand Poitiers

Government
  - Mayor (2020–2026): Gérard Herbert
- Area^{1}: 95.82 km^{2} (37.00 sq mi)
- Highest elevation: 149 m (489 ft)
- Lowest elevation: 61 m (200 ft)
- Population (2023): 7,007
  - Density: 73.13/km^{2} (189.4/sq mi)
- Time zone: UTC+01:00 (CET)
  - Summer (DST): UTC+02:00 (CEST)
- INSEE/Postal code: 86070 /86300
- ^{1} French Land Register data, which excludes lakes, ponds, glaciers > 1 km^{2} (0.386 sq mi or 247 acres) and river estuaries.

Chauvigny (French pronunciation: [ʃoviɲi]; Poitevin: Chôvigni) is a commune in the Vienne department in the Nouvelle-Aquitaine region in western France.

Chauvigny is located 20 miles (32 km) east of Poitiers by rail. The town is situated overlooking the river Vienne and a small brook. Chauvigny is twinned with Billericay in Essex, England.

The composer Fernand Lamy (1881–1966) was born in Chauvigny.

Chauvigny was among the places visited by Roger Fry the British artist, art critic and member of the Bloomsbury group in October 1911 when, after his visit to Paris to see the Salon d’Automne, he joined Clive Bell (husband of the celebrated English artist Vanessa Bell) and Duncan Grant (also a celebrated English artist) on a bicycle tour of the region to explore Romanesque churches. Fry produced a charming painting of Chauvigny

== Population ==
Historical population
Year	Pop.	±% p.a.
1968	6,653	—
1975	6,686	+0.07%
1982	6,565	−0.26%
1990	6,658	+0.18%
1999	7,025	+0.60%
2007	6,895	−0.23%
2012	6,962	+0.19%
2017	7,049	+0.25%
2023	7,007	−0.10%
Source: INSEE

== Sights ==
Chauvigny features two interesting Romanesque churches, both restored in the 19th century. There are also ruins of a château of the bishops of Poitiers and of several other strongholds.

Chauvigny - Romanesque church Saint-Pierre

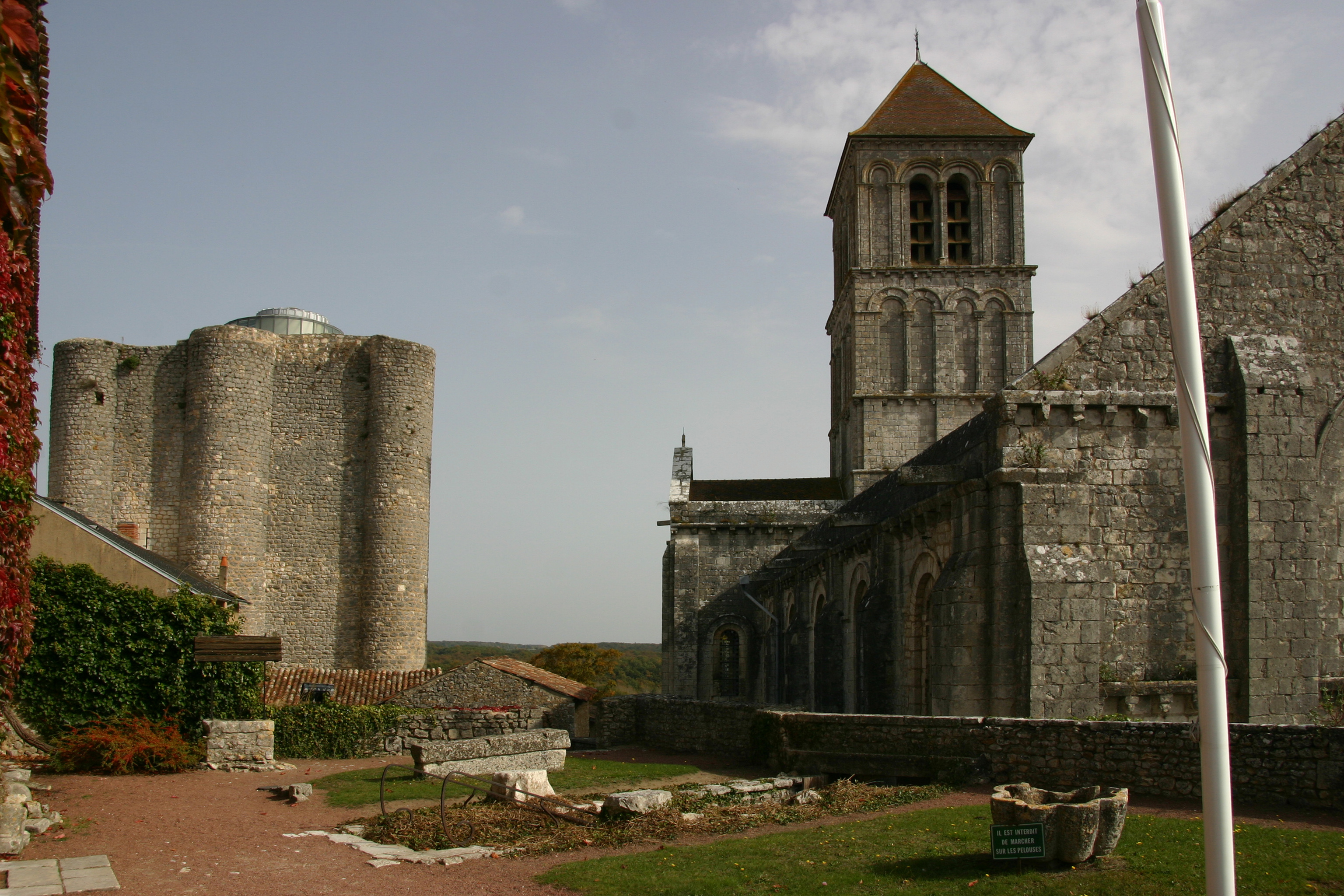

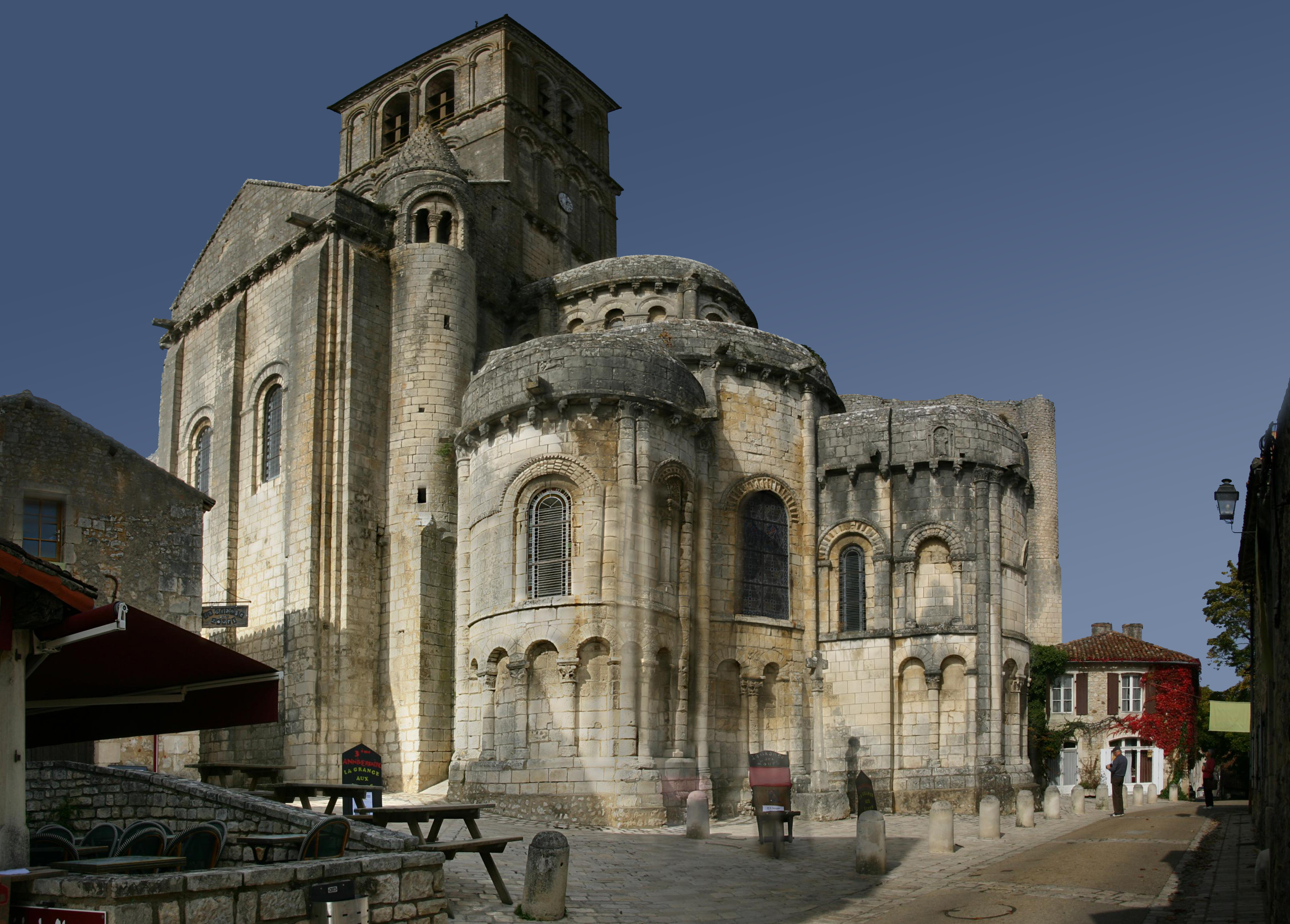

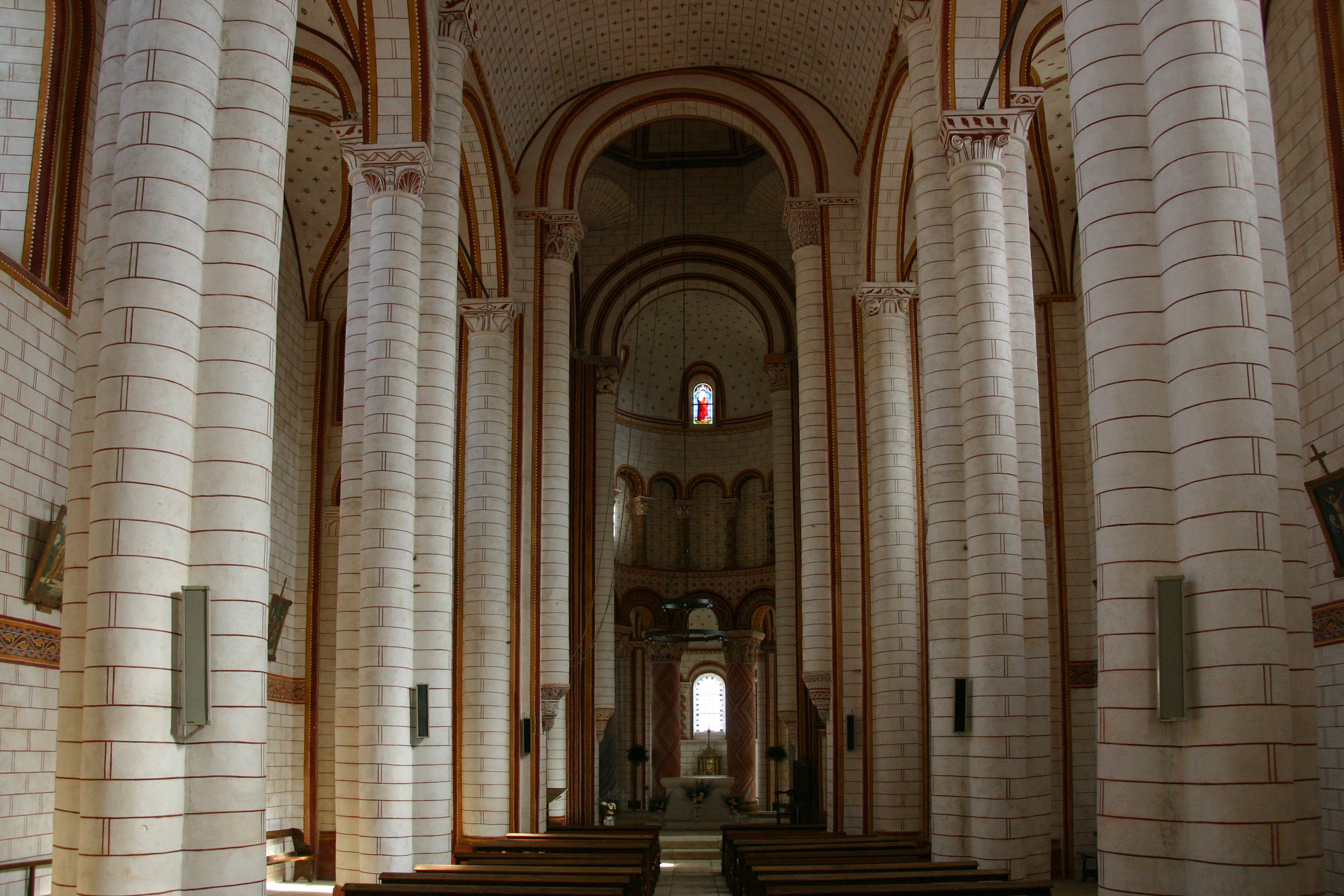

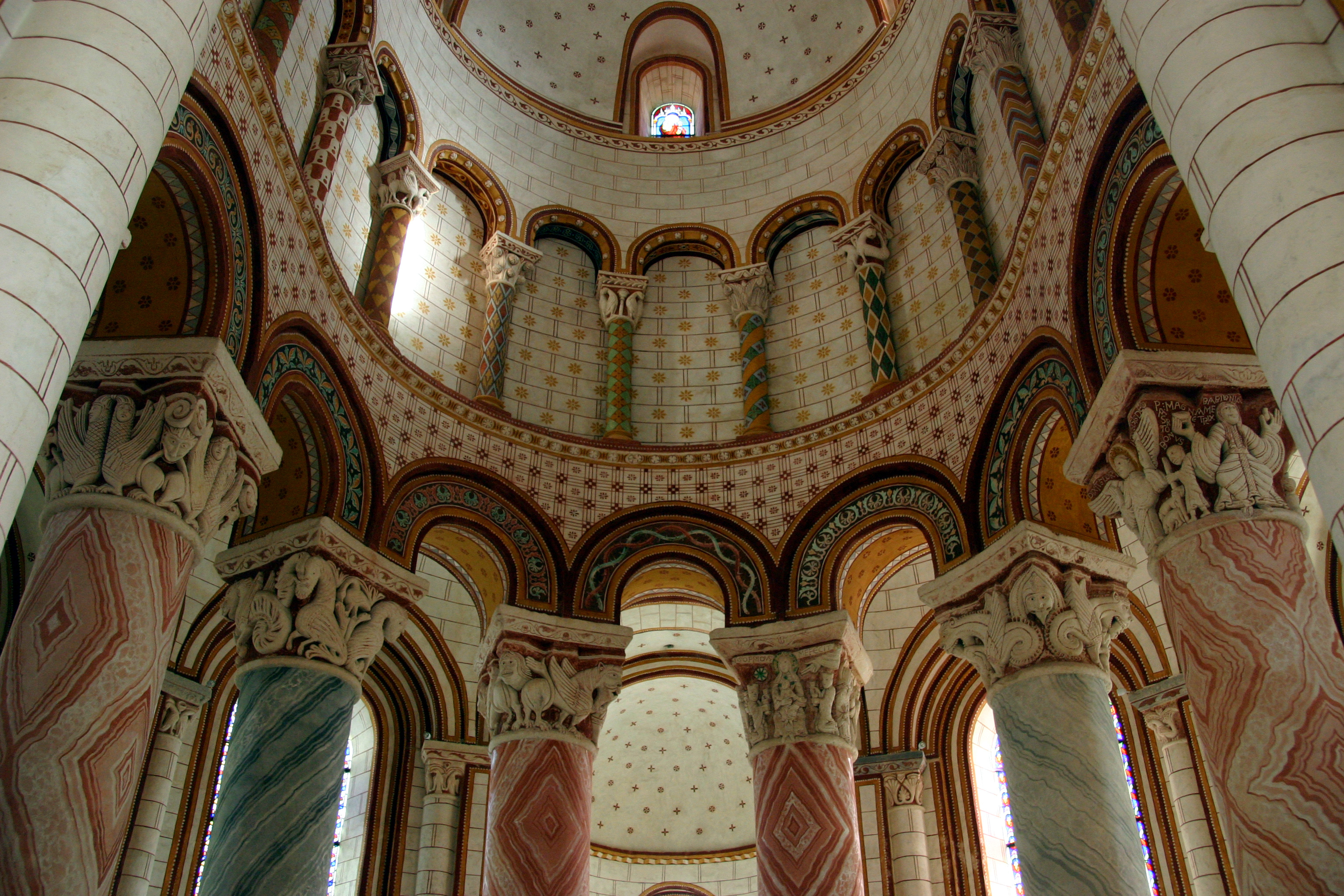

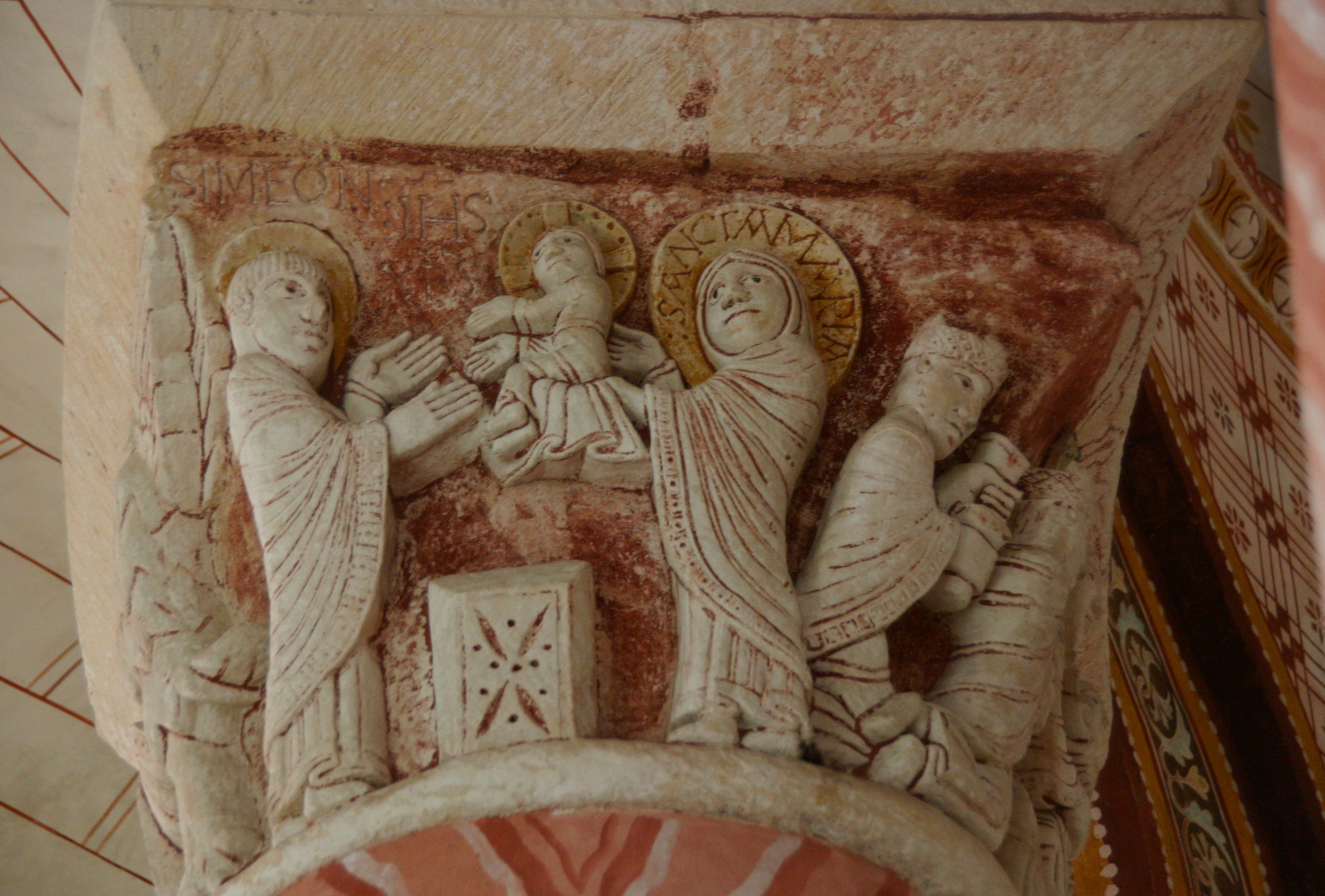

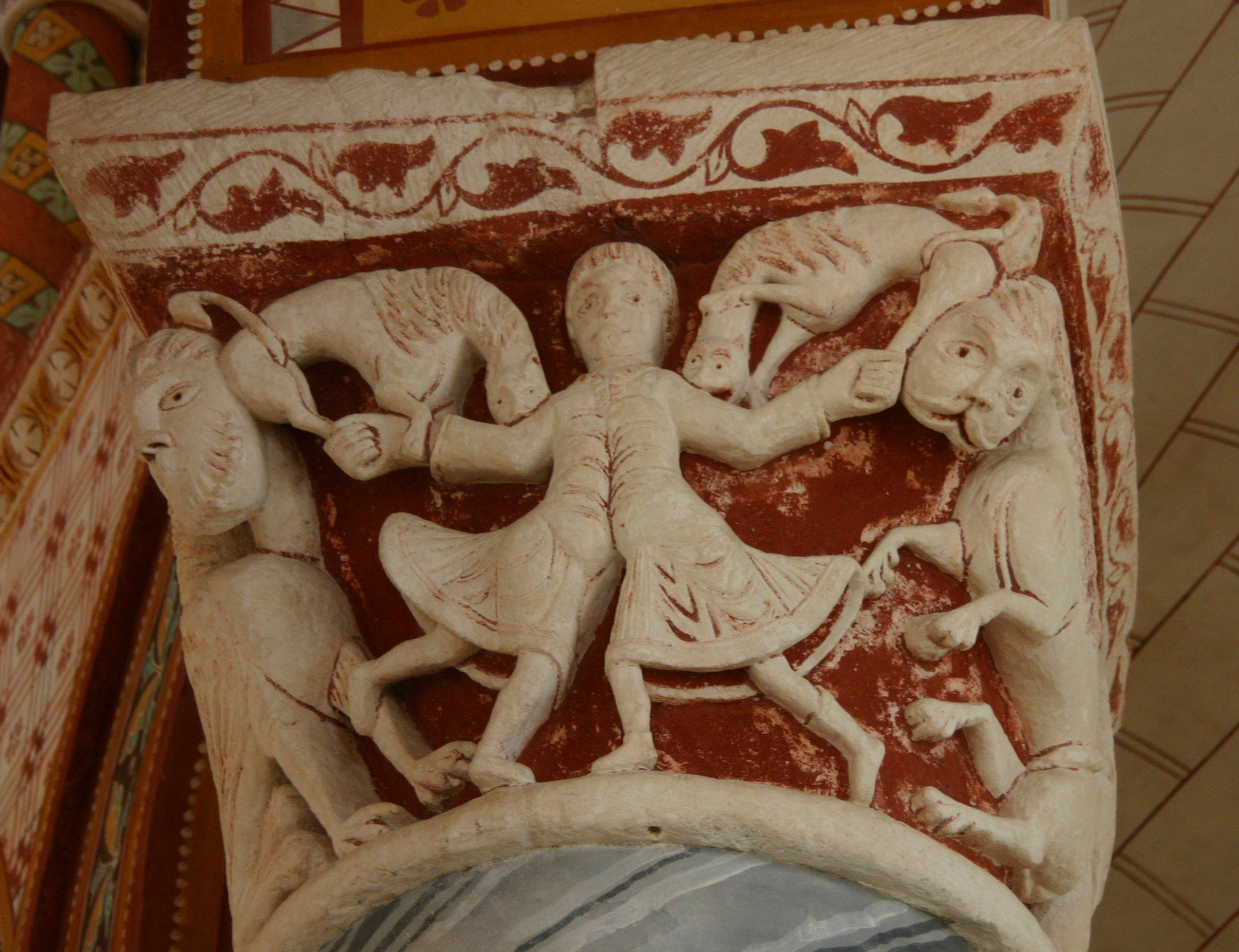

Near Chauvigny is the bone-cavern of Jioux, the entrance to which is fortified by large blocks of stone.

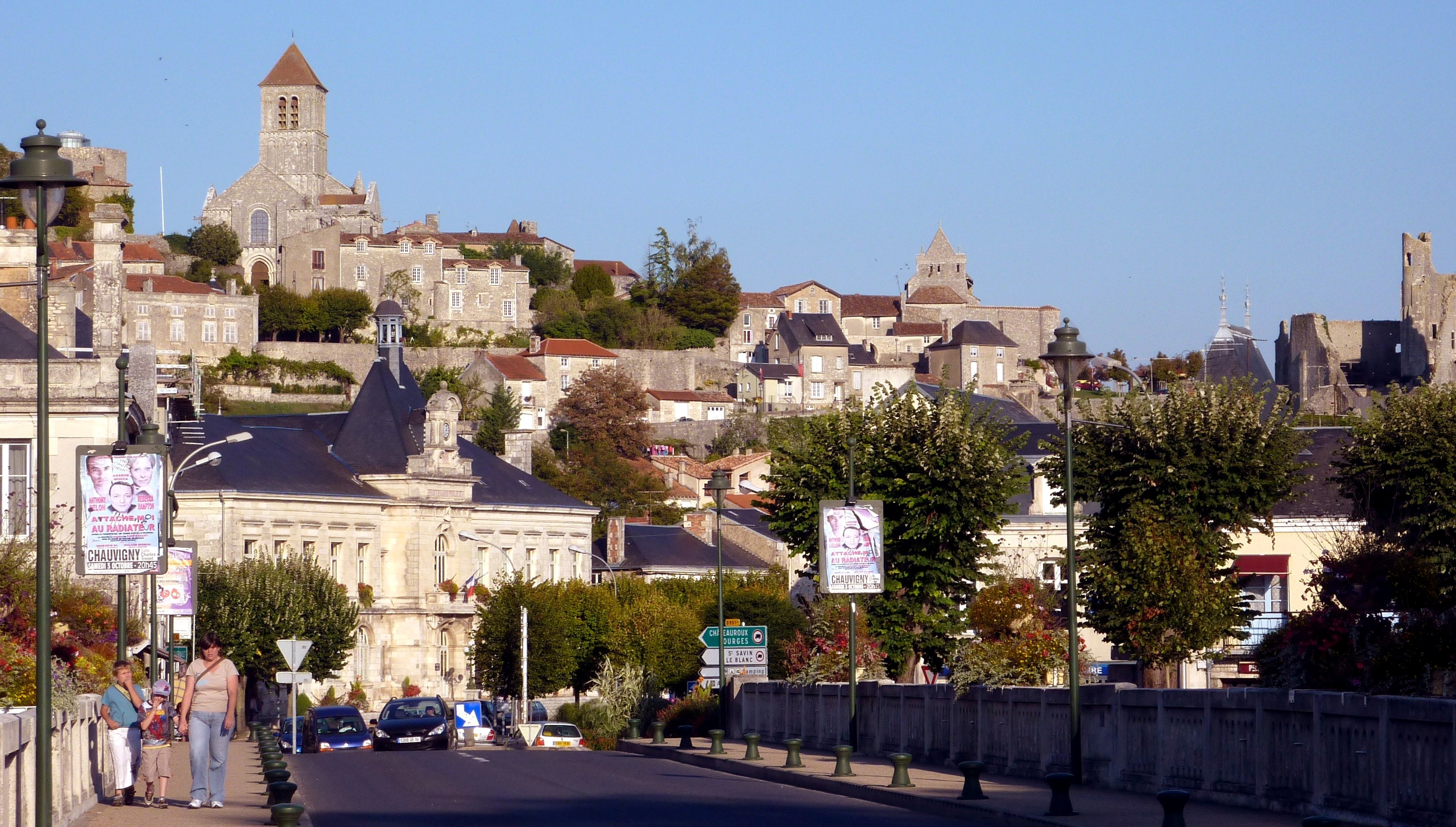
Panorama of Chauvigny

== Economy ==
As of 1911, the town carried on lime-burning and plaster-manufacture, and there were stone quarries in the vicinity. Trade was in wool and feathers.

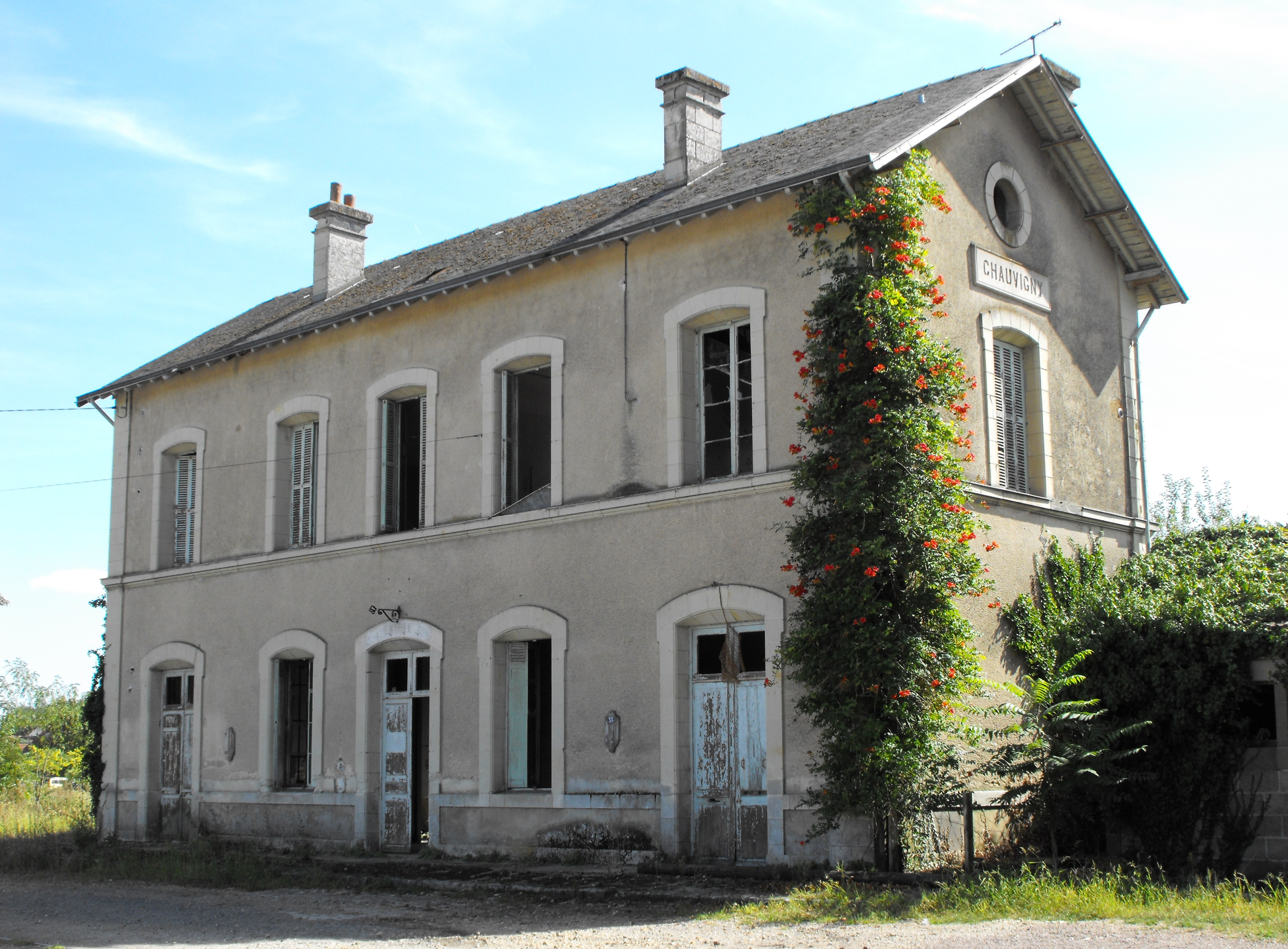
La gare de Chauvigny.

== See also ==
- Communes of the Vienne department
