= Conservatoire de Lille =

Music school in France

Coordinates: 50.642°N 3.062°E

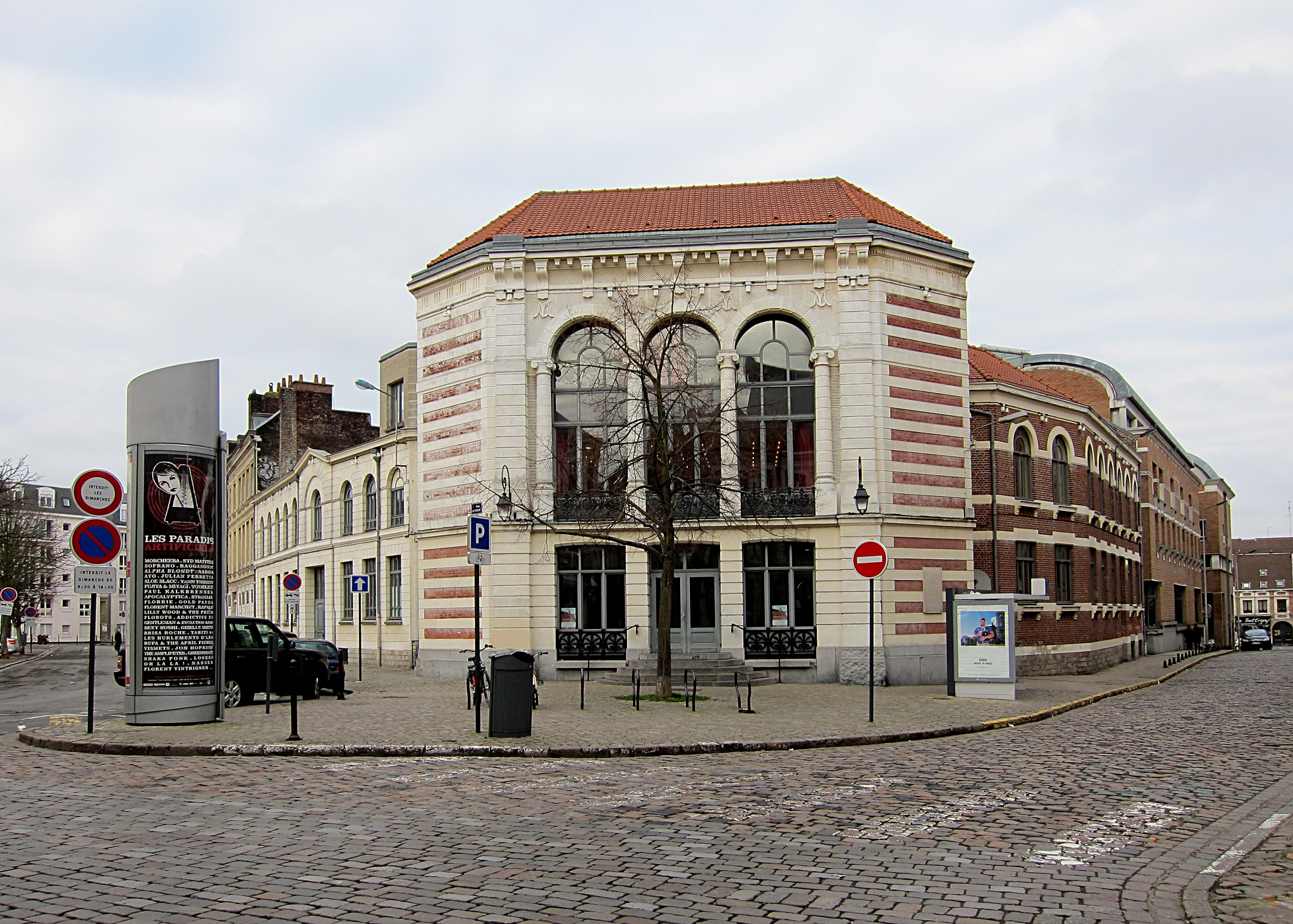

The Conservatoire de Lille is a music school in Lille, France. Founded in 1803, it was originally set out as a music conservatory, later branching out into theatre and dance in the second half of the 20th century.

The conservatory took the place of the Abbey St Pierre, sold and destroyed after the French Revolution. Construction of the building was completed in 1808. The large auditorium (Oval Room) was redesigned in 1897 by Émile Vandenbergh. The renovated parts of the building were completed on 27 February 1988, the organist Philippe Lefebvre then being director.

Pupils at the academy are aged between 5 and 12 years, and are not exclusively from the city of Lille itself. As of 2014, it had around 2,000 students and 140 staff.

It has a 400-seat auditorium and a library with over 40,000 works in a variety of media. Regular concerts and performances are held there, starring both alumni and third parties.

Former students include the actor Hugo Becker and composer Marcelle Villin.

The building has been referred to repeatedly in the publication La Symphonie Dans La Cité: Lille Au XIXe Siècle by Guy Gosselin.
