= Alex Evans (cyclist) =

Australian cyclist (born 1997)

Alexander Evans
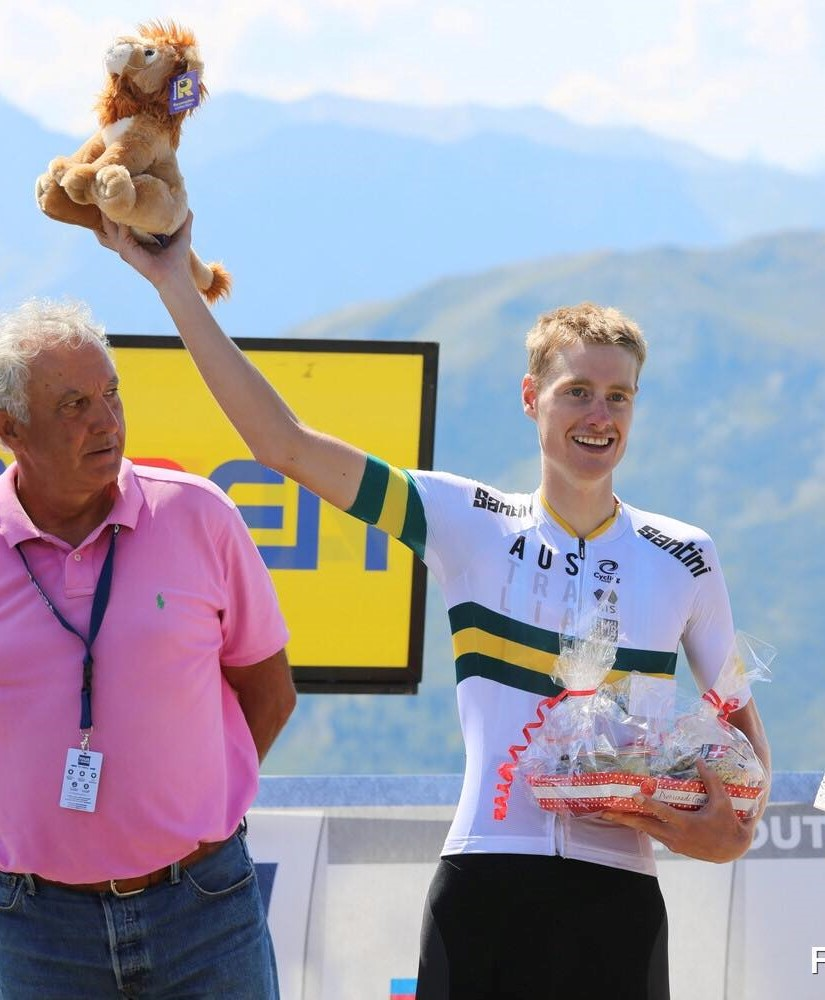

Personal information
- Full name: Alexander Evans
- Born: 28 January 1997 (age 29) Bendigo, Australia
- Height: 1.84 m (6 ft 0 in)
- Weight: 63 kg (139 lb)

Cycling career
- Sport: Cycling
- Current team: St George Continental Cycling Team
- Discipline: Road
- Role: Rider

Amateur teams
- 2017: AMR Renault Race
- 2018: BMC Racing Team (stagiaire)

Professional teams
- 2018: Mobius–BridgeLane
- 2019: SEG Racing Academy
- 2020: Circus–Wanty Gobert
- 2021: Intermarché–Wanty–Gobert Matériaux
- 2022: Maloja Pushbikers
- 2024–: St George Continental Cycling Team

Alexander Evans (born 28 January 1997) is an Australian cyclist, who currently rides for UCI Continental team St George Continental Cycling Team.

== Major results ==
2018
8th Overall Herald Sun Tour
2019
1st Stage 8 Tour de l'Avenir
10th Overall Tour Alsace
2022
9th Overall Oberösterreich Rundfahrt
