= Nans Peters =

French bicycle racer

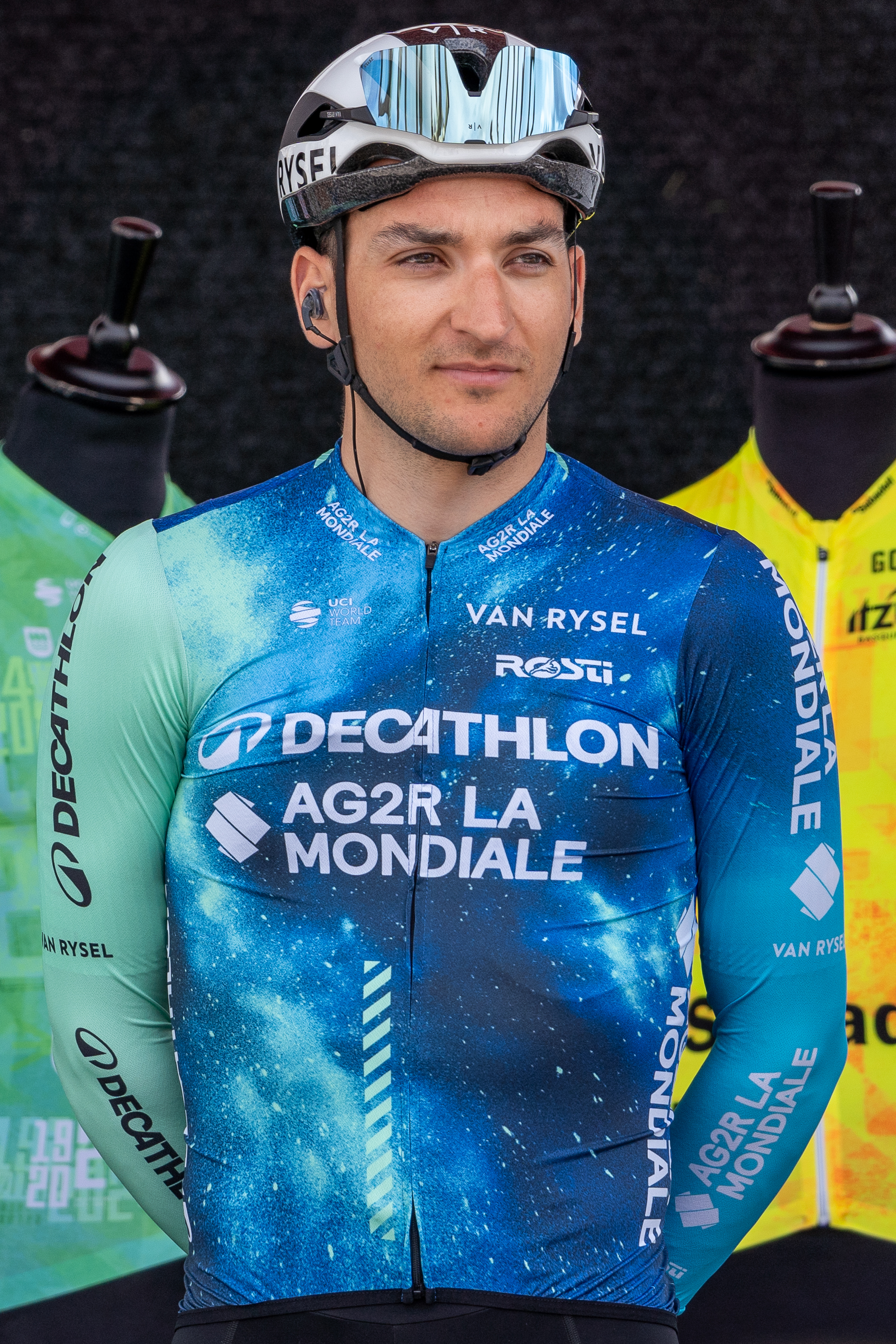
- Peters in Espelette, 2024 Itzulia.

Personal information
- Full name: Nans Peters
- Born: 12 March 1994 (age 32) Grenoble, France
- Height: 1.77 m (5 ft 10 in)
- Weight: 72 kg (159 lb)

Cycling career
- Sport: Cycling
- Current team: Decathlon CMA CGM Team
- Discipline: Road
- Role: Rider
- Rider type: Puncheur

Amateur team
- 2010–2016: Chambéry CF

Professional teams
- 2016: → AG2R La Mondiale (stagiaire)
- 2017–2025: AG2R La Mondiale

Major wins
- Grand Tours Tour de France 1 individual stage (2020) Giro d'Italia 1 individual stage (2019) One-day races and Classics Trofeo Laigueglia (2023)

Nans Peters (born 12 March 1994) is a French cyclist, who retired in 2025 having ridden for UCI WorldTeam Decathlon CMA CGM Team.

== Career ==
=== Amateur career ===
Before turning professional, he set a new record for most selections for the French national Under-23 team, being chosen 20 times: he established himself as the team's road captain, and supported David Gaudu in his victory at the Tour de l'Avenir in 2016.

=== Professional career ===
After turning professional with AG2R La Mondiale in 2017, he was originally slated to make his Grand Tour debut at the 2018 Giro d'Italia, but was unable to compete after breaking his collarbone during the Classic Loire Atlantique during March of that year. In August 2018, he was named in the startlist for the Vuelta a España. In May 2019, he was named in the startlist for the Giro d'Italia, and went on to win stage 17 of the race. In August 2020, he was named in the start list for the Tour de France, and went on to win stage 8 of the race. He took his third professional win at the 2023 Trofeo Laigueglia in a 30 kilometer solo effort.

== Personal life ==
He was named after Nans le berger, a French television serial of the 1970s of which his mother was a fan.

== Major results ==
2012
1st Overall Tour du Valromey
7th Overall Ronde des Vallées

1st Mountains classification
1st Stage 3

2014
3rd Time trial, National Under-23 Road Championships
4th Piccolo Giro di Lombardia
2015
3rd Time trial, National Under-23 Road Championships
4th Overall Tour de l'Ain
4th Ronde van Vlaanderen Beloften
2016
10th Overall ZLM Roompot Tour
2018
5th Overall Tour de l'Ain
2019 (1 pro win)
Giro d'Italia

1st Stage 17
Held after Stages 9–11

3rd Gran Piemonte
3rd Paris–Chauny
3rd Tokyo 2020 Test Event
5th Trofeo Laigueglia
9th Overall Route d'Occitanie
9th Grand Prix Cycliste de Montréal
2020 (1)
Tour de France

1st Stage 8
Combativity award Stage 8

9th Ardèche Classic
2022
8th Tour du Jura
2023 (1)
1st Trofeo Laigueglia
3rd Tour du Doubs
4th Tour du Jura
5th Road race, National Road Championships
2024
10th Boucles de l'Aulne
2025
10th Overall Four Days of Dunkirk

=== Grand Tour general classification results timeline ===
Grand Tour	2018	2019	2020	2021	2022	2023
Giro d'Italia	—	61	—	—	58	—
Tour de France	—	—	65	DNF	—	73
Vuelta a España	72	—	36	—	61	—

Legend
—	Did not compete
DNF	Did not finish
IP	In progress
