= 2020 Tour de France =

Cycling race

2020 UCI World Tour, race 12 of 21
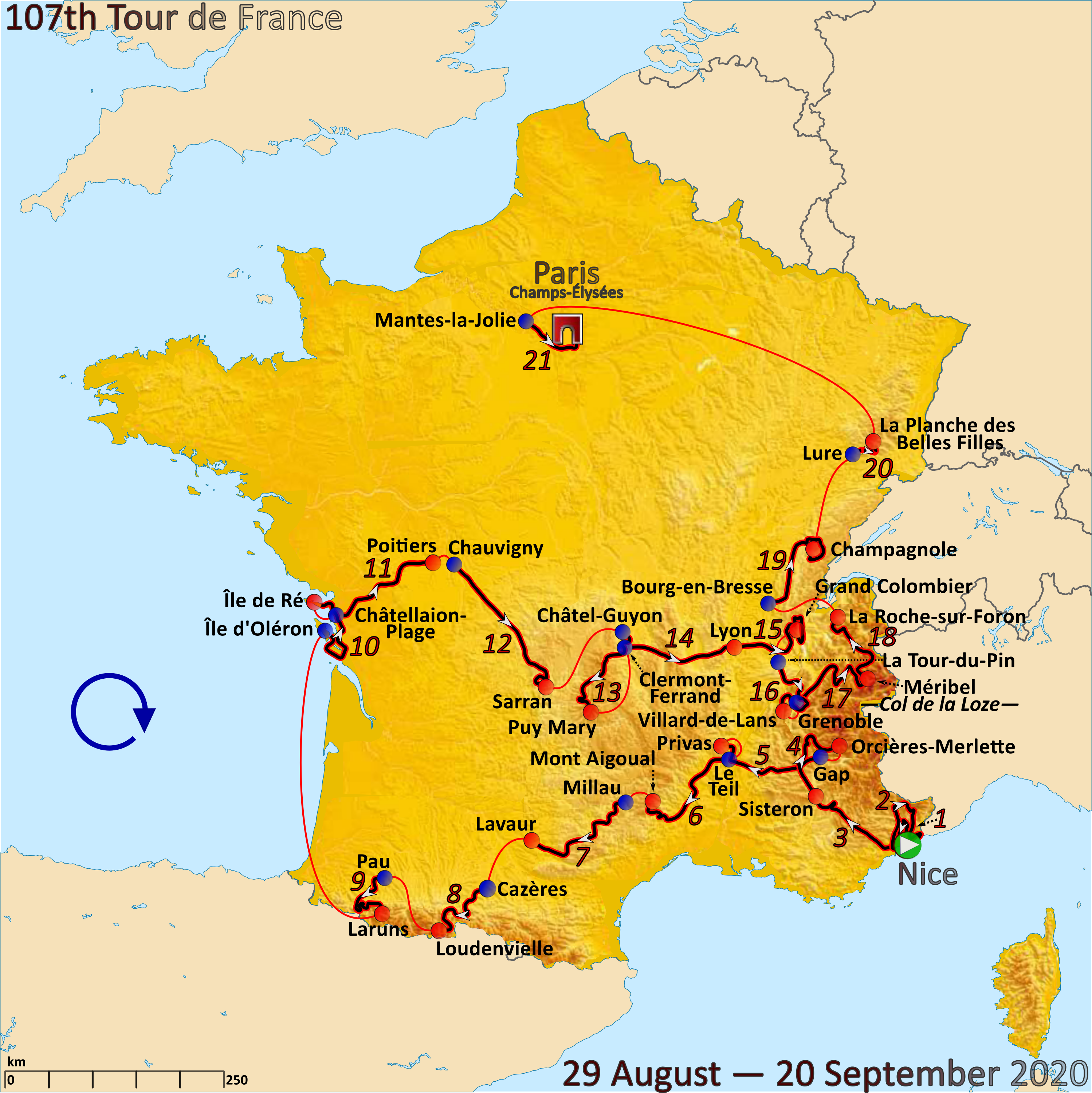
- Route of the 2020 Tour de France

Race details
- Dates: 29 August — 20 September 2020
- Stages: 21
- Distance: 3,484.2 km (2,165.0 mi)
- Winning time: 87h 20' 05"

Results
Jersey awarded to the overall winner	Winner	Tadej Pogačar (SLO)	(UAE Team Emirates)
	Second	Primož Roglič (SLO)	(Team Jumbo–Visma)
	Third	Richie Porte (AUS)	(Trek–Segafredo)
Jersey awarded to the points classification winner	Points	Sam Bennett (IRL)	(Deceuninck–Quick-Step)
Jersey awarded to the mountains classification winner	Mountains	Tadej Pogačar (SLO)	(UAE Team Emirates)
Jersey awarded to the young rider classification winner	Young rider	Tadej Pogačar (SLO)	(UAE Team Emirates)
Jersey awarded to the combativity classification winner	Combativity	Marc Hirschi (SUI)	(Team Sunweb)
Jersey awarded to the team classification winner	Team	(Spain) Movistar Team	

The 2020 Tour de France was the 107th edition of the Tour de France, one of cycling's three Grand Tours. Originally scheduled to start on 27 June 2020, it was postponed until 29 August 2020 due to the COVID-19 pandemic in France. The race began in Nice on 29 August and concluded with its traditional run on the Champs-Élysées on 20 September. A total of 176 riders from 22 teams participated in the race. The overall general classification was won for the first time by a Slovenian, Tadej Pogačar of UAE Team Emirates. His fellow countryman Primož Roglič (Team Jumbo–Visma) finished second, while Australian Richie Porte (Trek–Segafredo) came third.

Alexander Kristoff won the bunch sprint on stage 1 to take the first yellow jersey of the tour. Julian Alaphilippe, who led much of the previous year's tour, took the lead of the race after winning stage 2. Alaphilippe received a 20-second penalty for receiving food too close to the finish on stage 5 and lost his lead to Adam Yates. Yates held the lead for four stages before losing significant time in the mountainous stage 9, handing the lead to Roglič. Roglič held the yellow jersey for 11 stages, but was overtaken during the penultimate stage 20 time trial by Pogačar. With only the traditional procession on the Champs-Élysées remaining, Pogačar held his lead on the final stage.

The points classification was won by Deceuninck–Quick-Step's Sam Bennett, marking the first time that Peter Sagan had not won the points classification in a Tour he finished. The mountains classification and the young rider classification were both won by Pogačar, making him the first rider to win the yellow, polka dot, and white jerseys in the same year. Pogačar is the first rider to win three distinctive jerseys since Eddy Merckx in 1972, the first rider since Laurent Fignon in 1983 to win the Tour in his debut, and the first rider since Cadel Evans in 2011 to win the yellow jersey on the penultimate stage of the race.

Movistar Team won the team classification for the third consecutive year. Marc Hirschi of Team Sunweb was named the overall most combative rider. Pogačar won the most stages, with three.

== Postponement ==
The 2020 Tour was in jeopardy of being cancelled as a result of the COVID-19 pandemic resulting in a virtual Tour being held using Zwift. On 14 April 2020 the International Cycling Union (UCI) announced the start of the 2020 Tour would be postponed until 29 August 2020, with the Giro d'Italia and Vuelta a España to follow in October.

== Teams ==
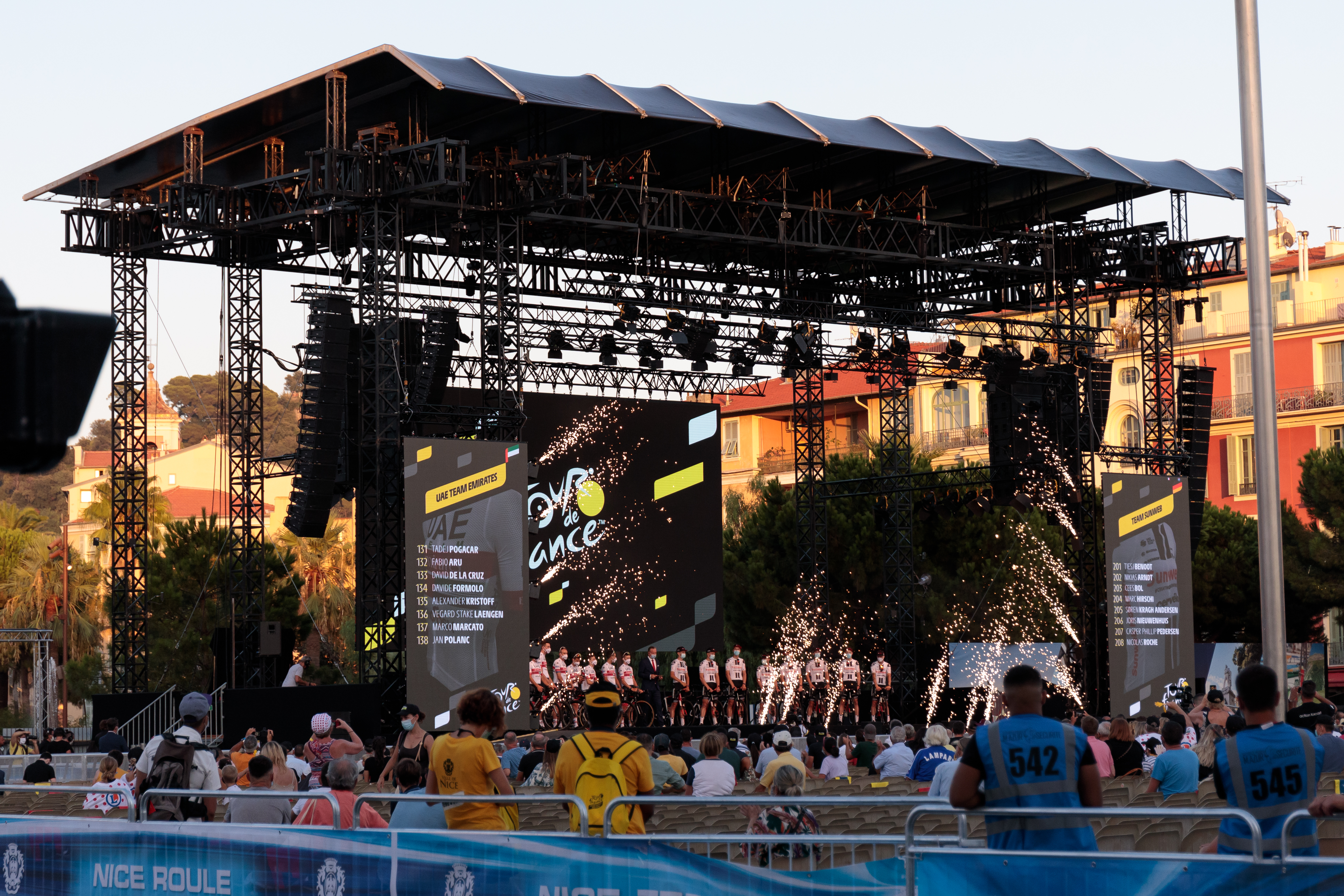
The team presentation in Nice

The 2020 Tour de France peloton consisted of 22 teams. All nineteen UCI WorldTeams were entitled, and obliged, to enter the race. Additionally, Amaury Sport Organisation (ASO), the organisers of the Tour, invited three second-tier UCI ProTeams to participate in the event. The teams were announced on 7 January 2020. With every team fielding eight riders, 176 riders started the race in Nice. As 30 riders abandoned during the race, 146 riders made it to the finish line on the Champs-Élysées in Paris.

Teams that participated:

UCI WorldTeams

- AG2R La Mondiale
- Astana
- Bahrain–McLaren
- Bora–Hansgrohe
- CCC Team
- Cofidis
- Deceuninck–Quick-Step
- EF Pro Cycling
- Groupama–FDJ
- INEOS Grenadiers
- Israel Start-Up Nation
- Lotto–Soudal
- Mitchelton–Scott
- Movistar Team
- NTT Pro Cycling
- Team Jumbo–Visma
- Team Sunweb
- Trek–Segafredo
- UAE Team Emirates

UCI ProTeams

- Arkéa–Samsic
- B&B Hotels–Vital Concept
- Total Direct Énergie

== Pre-race favourites ==
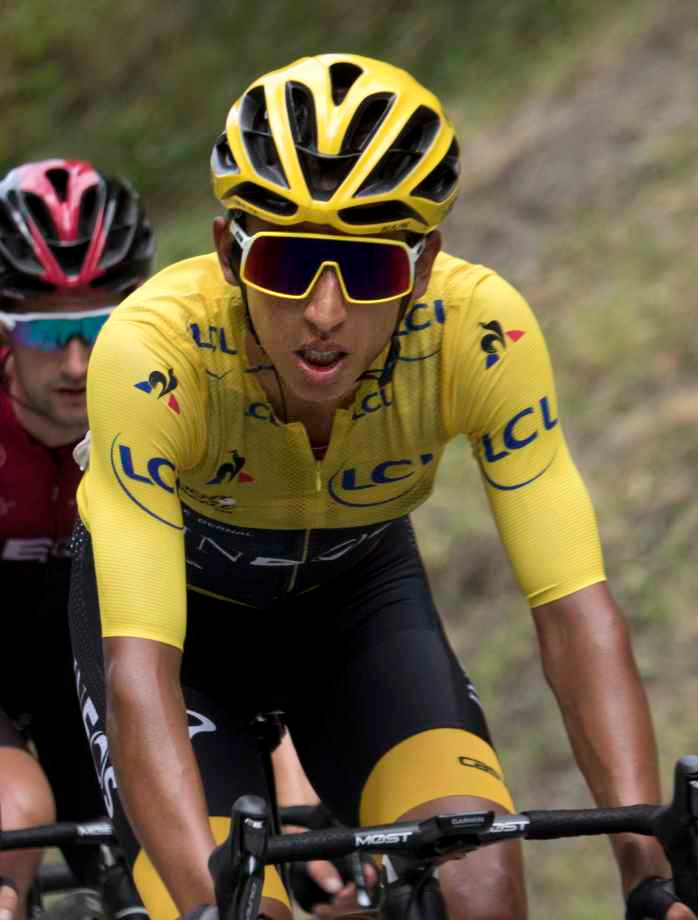
Bernal at the 2019 Tour de France

Pre-race predictions in the media for the general classification changed with the postponement of the Tour. INEOS Grenadiers's Egan Bernal, the defending champion, sought to win a second title. Bernal's teammates, Geraint Thomas, who won in 2018, as well as four-time Tour winner Chris Froome, both did not participate after their poor results in the Critérium du Dauphiné. Team Jumbo–Visma's duo of Primož Roglič, winner of the 2019 Vuelta a España, and Tom Dumoulin, were also seen as top contenders, as was their teammate Steven Kruijswijk, who finished third the previous year.

Other riders considered as contenders included: Miguel Ángel López (Astana), Romain Bardet, Emanuel Buchmann (Bora–Hansgrohe), who finished fourth in the previous year's Tour, Mikel Landa (Bahrain–McLaren), Guillaume Martin (Cofidis), Daniel Martínez (winner of the Critérium du Dauphiné), Nairo Quintana (Arkéa–Samsic), Tadej Pogačar (UAE Team Emirates), who finished third in the 2019 Vuelta a España, Richie Porte, and Bauke Mollema (Trek–Segafredo). An outside contender was Julian Alaphilippe, who wore the yellow jersey for 14 days the previous year and managed to finish fifth, but the Frenchman confirmed that his focus would be on winning stages and not targeting the general classification.

For the points classification, the favourite was Peter Sagan of Bora–Hansgrohe, who holds the record for the most wins of the points classification. Other favourites included Sam Bennett (Deceuninck–Quick-Step); Giacomo Nizzolo (NTT Pro Cycling), who won the Italian National Road Race Championships and the European Road Race Championships; Caleb Ewan (Lotto–Soudal), who won three stages the previous year; and Wout van Aert (Team Jumbo–Visma), winner of the 2020 Strade Bianche and 2020 Milan–San Remo.

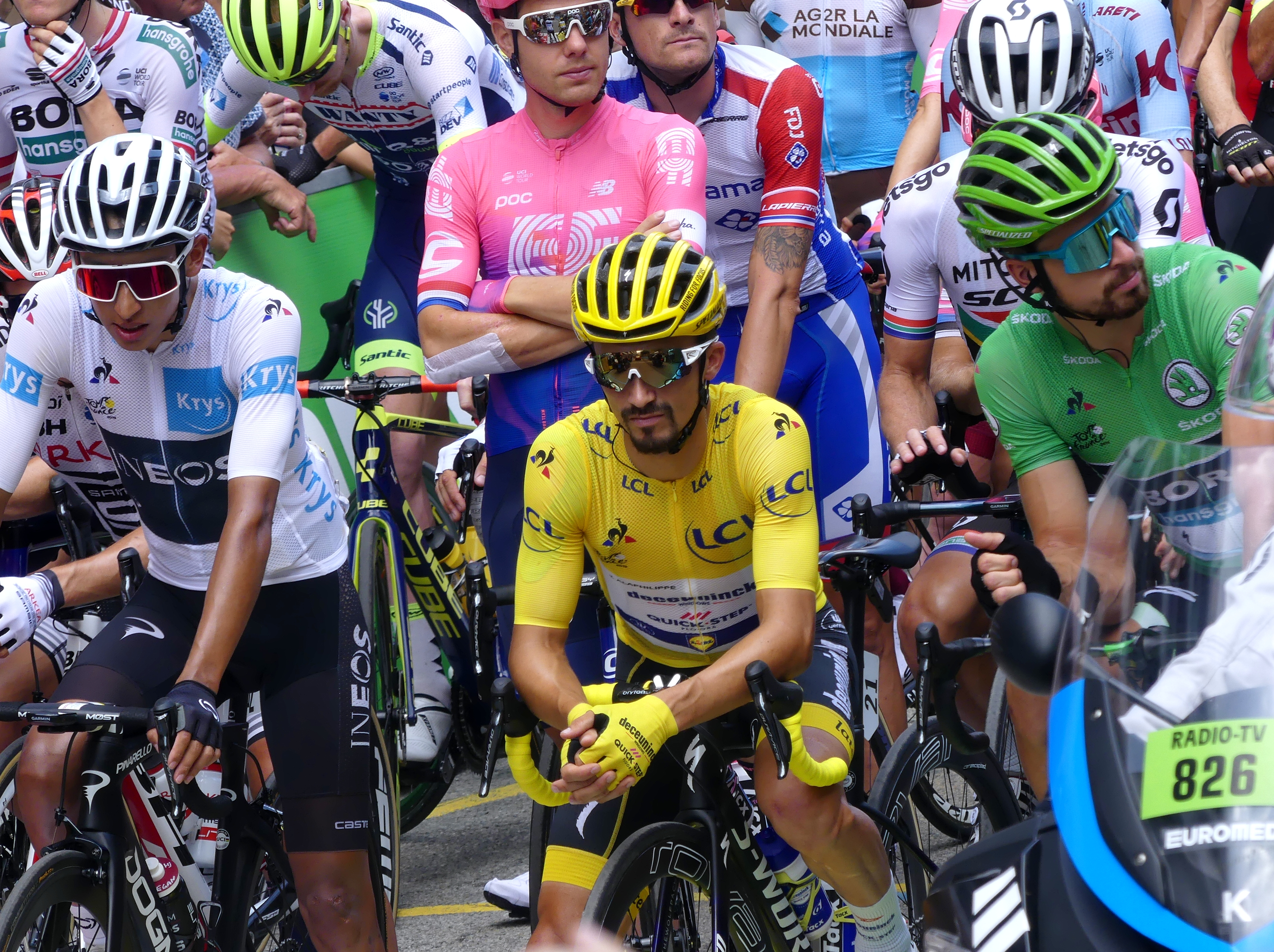
Leaders of the young rider, general and points classifications Egan Bernal, Julian Alaphilippe and Peter Sagan, respectively, lining up before stage 19 of the 2019 Tour de France

Among the contenders for the mountains classification were the past three winners: 2017 winner Warren Barguil (Arkéa–Samsic), 2018 winner Julian Alaphilippe, and 2019 winner Romain Bardet (AG2R La Mondiale).

The two main favourites for the young rider classification were defending champion Egan Bernal and Tour debutant Tadej Pogačar.

Two teams were considered the front-runners for the teams classification; INEOS Grenadiers who previously won the classification in 2017, and Team Jumbo–Visma. Movistar Team, which had won the teams classification in four of the last five Tours, were also expected to challenge for the classification.

== Route and stages ==
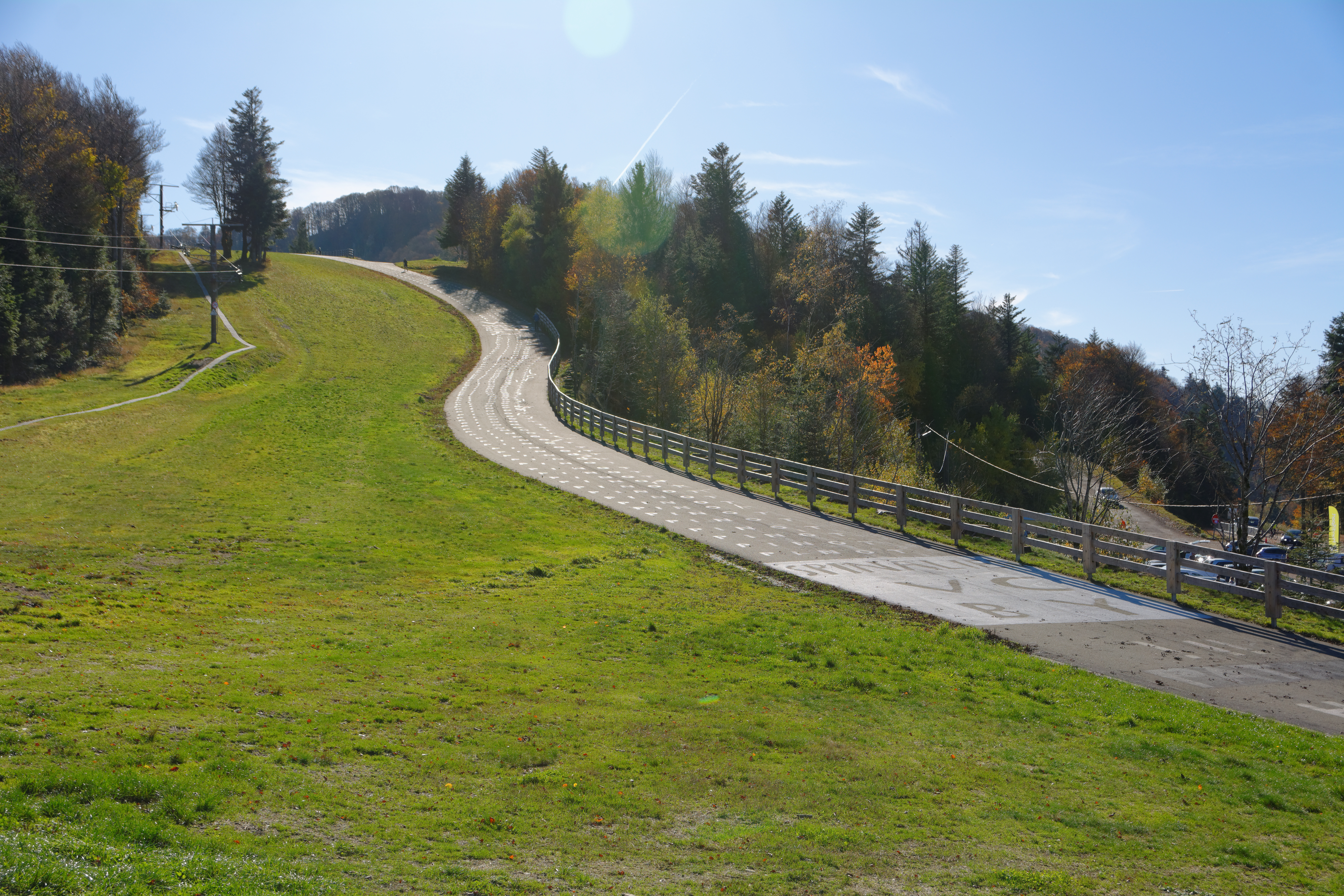
The time trial on stage 20 finished at the top of the La Planche des Belles Filles climb, 5.9 km (3.7 mi) in length with an average gradient of 8.5%.

The start of the 2020 Tour (known as the Grand Départ) took place in Nice. This was the second occasion that the city has held the Grand Départ, the first being for the 1981 Tour de France. This was the 36th occasion on which the Tour de France has visited Nice, and the first time since the 2013 Tour de France. This year's race took place entirely within France.

Stage characteristics and winners
Stage	Date	Course	Distance	Type	Winner
1	29 August	Nice to Nice	156 km (97 mi)	Flat stage	Alexander Kristoff (NOR)
2	30 August	Nice to Nice	186 km (116 mi)	Medium mountain stage	Julian Alaphilippe (FRA)
3	31 August	Nice to Sisteron	198 km (123 mi)	Flat stage	Caleb Ewan (AUS)
4	1 September	Sisteron to Orcières-Merlette	160.5 km (99.7 mi)	Hilly stage	Primož Roglič (SLO)
5	2 September	Gap to Privas	183 km (114 mi)	Flat stage	Wout van Aert (BEL)
6	3 September	Le Teil to Mont Aigoual	191 km (119 mi)	Hilly stage	Alexey Lutsenko (KAZ)
7	4 September	Millau to Lavaur	168 km (104 mi)	Flat stage	Wout van Aert (BEL)
8	5 September	Cazères to Loudenvielle	141 km (88 mi)	Mountain stage	Nans Peters (FRA)
9	6 September	Pau to Laruns	153 km (95 mi)	Mountain stage	Tadej Pogačar (SLO)
	7 September	Charente-Maritime		Rest day	
10	8 September	Île d'Oléron to Île de Ré	168.5 km (104.7 mi)	Flat stage	Sam Bennett (IRL)
11	9 September	Châtelaillon-Plage to Poitiers	167 km (104 mi)	Flat stage	Caleb Ewan (AUS)
12	10 September	Chauvigny to Sarran	218 km (135 mi)	Hilly stage	Marc Hirschi (SUI)
13	11 September	Châtel-Guyon to Puy Mary	191.5 km (119.0 mi)	Medium mountain stage	Daniel Martínez (COL)
14	12 September	Clermont-Ferrand to Lyon	194 km (121 mi)	Hilly stage	Søren Kragh Andersen (DEN)
15	13 September	Lyon to Grand Colombier	174.5 km (108.4 mi)	Mountain stage	Tadej Pogačar (SLO)
	14 September	Isère		Rest day	
16	15 September	La Tour-du-Pin to Villard-de-Lans	164 km (102 mi)	Mountain stage	Lennard Kämna (GER)
17	16 September	Grenoble to Méribel (Col de la Loze)	170 km (110 mi)	Mountain stage	Miguel Ángel López (COL)
18	17 September	Méribel to La Roche-sur-Foron	175 km (109 mi)	Mountain stage	Michał Kwiatkowski (POL)
19	18 September	Bourg-en-Bresse to Champagnole	166.5 km (103.5 mi)	Flat stage	Søren Kragh Andersen (DEN)
20	19 September	Lure to La Planche des Belles Filles	36.2 km (22.5 mi)	Mountain time trial	Tadej Pogačar (SLO)
21	20 September	Mantes-la-Jolie to Paris (Champs-Élysées)	122 km (76 mi)	Flat stage	Sam Bennett (IRL)
	Total		3,484.2 km (2,165.0 mi)		

== Race overview ==
=== Grand Départ and the first week ===
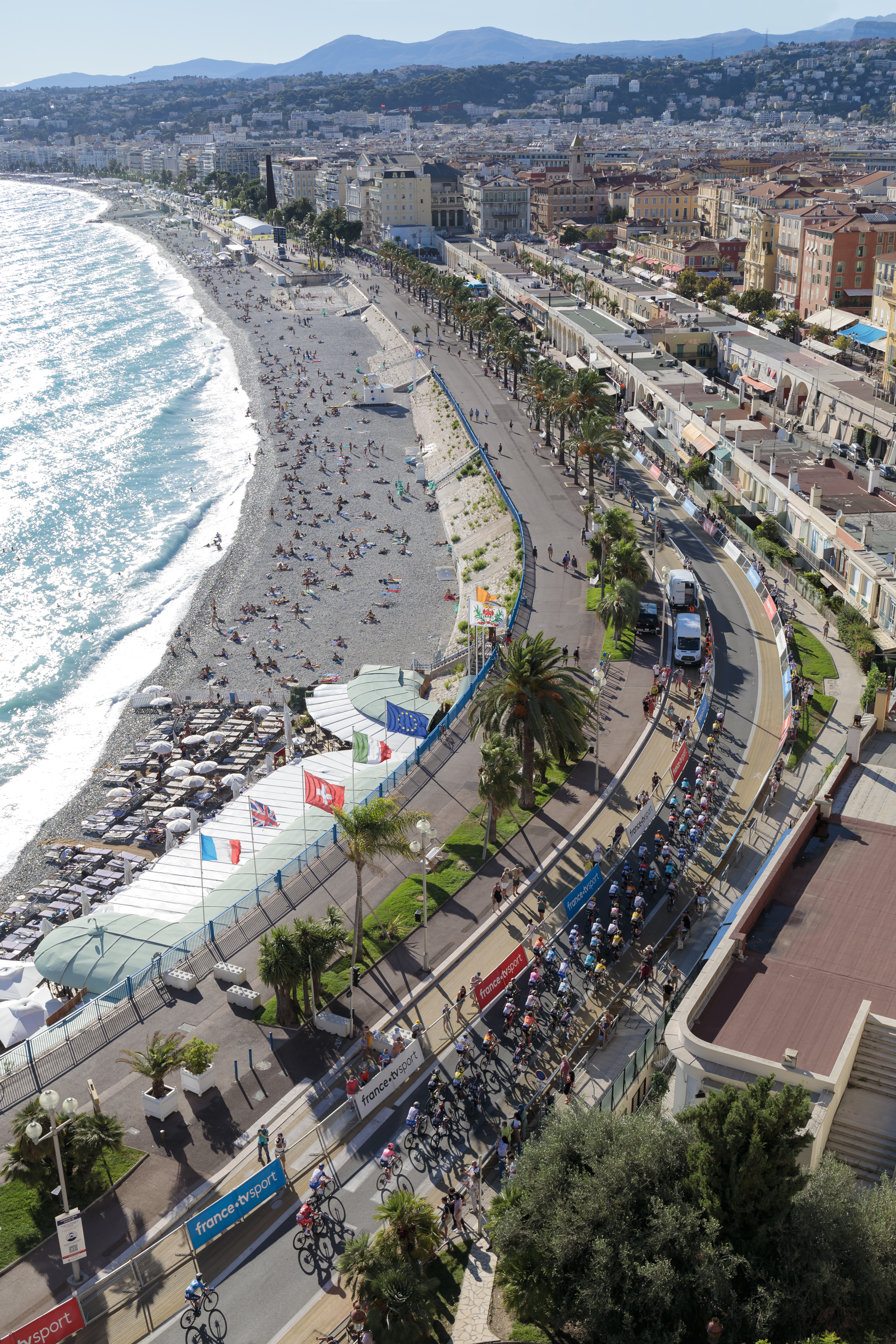
The peloton in Nice on stage 2

The first three stages of the Tour would begin in Nice, France, in late August due to the worldwide pandemic. Stage one was intended to be a flat sprinter's stage around the city, and began as expected with a three rider breakaway. The break was caught early in the stage, after racing for the King of the Mountains points were split equally, with the jersey won by Fabien Grellier for getting there first. With 100 km to go, an unseasonable driving rainstorm moved in causing the roads to become treacherous throughout the remainder of the day. Despite the peloton calling a truce in the interest of safety, Miguel Ángel López, John Degenkolb, Philippe Gilbert, Caleb Ewan, Rafael Valls, Julian Alaphilippe, George Bennett and many other riders were involved in crashes, causing several of them to abandon.

With 3 km to go there was a large pileup along the Promenade des Anglais in downtown Nice. The race jury decided anyone involved in this crash would receive the same time as the winner. Alexander Kristoff was involved in this crash, but because the sprinters' teams and leadout trains were not operating at top speed, as they would under normal conditions, he was able to make his way back to the front and beat the defending World Champion Mads Pedersen, as well as Bol, Bennett, Sagan and Viviani to win the stage and take the yellow jersey.

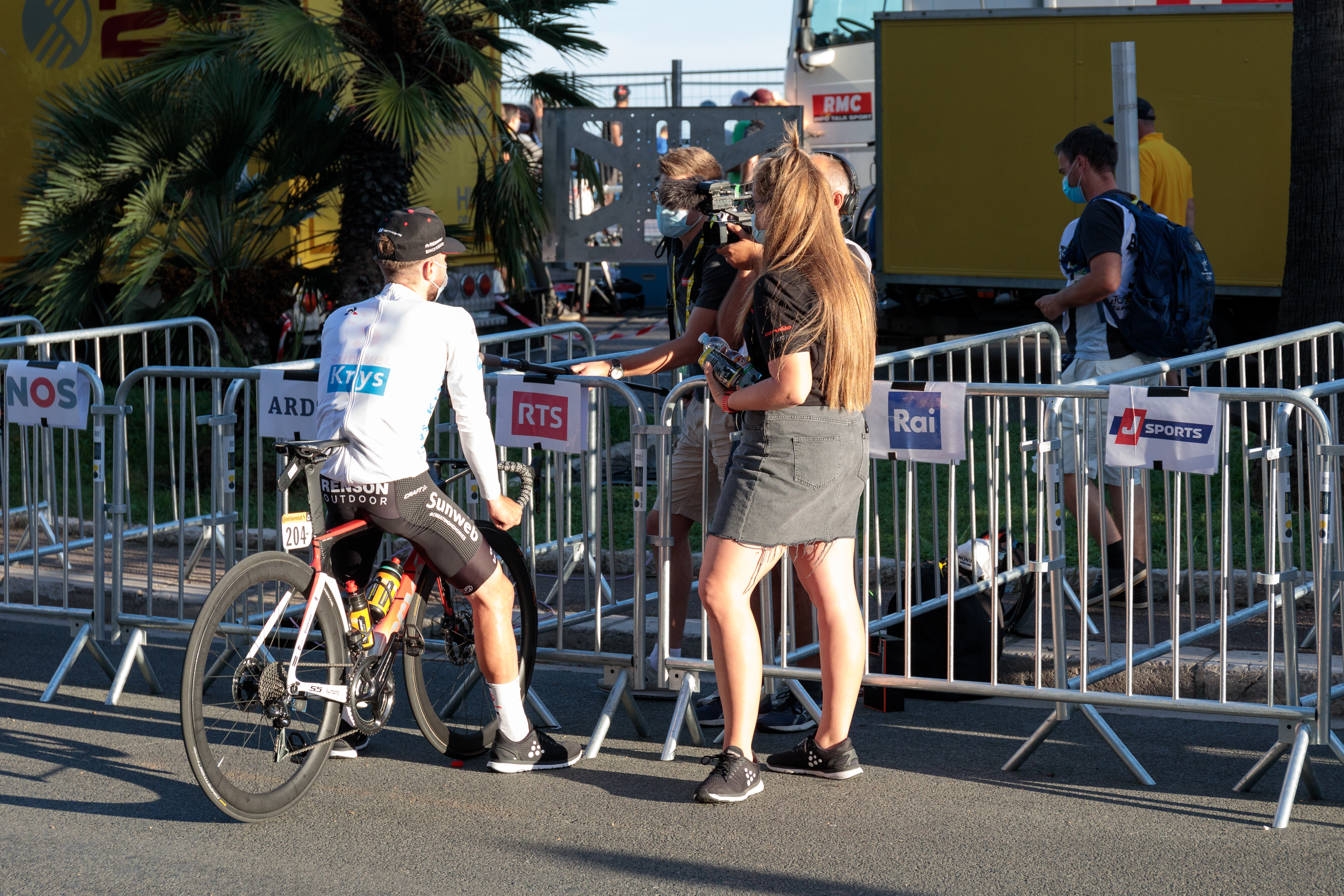
Marc Hirschi wearing a face mask is interviewed after the 2nd stage. The journalist is maintaining a physical distance between him and the cyclist using a pole with the microphone attached to the end.

Stage two saw better weather, as well as two Category 1 climbs. The previous stage, Gilbert fractured a kneecap and Valls broke his leg, and neither started the stage. Attacks began early with Cosnefroy, Asgreen, Skujiņš, Gogl, Trentin, Sagan, Postlberger and Perez forming the escape bunch, but were unable to gain more than three minutes from the peloton. Cosnefroy attacked on the Col de la Colmiane, reaching the summit alone to claim the KOM points. By the time the main field reached the summit, the gap had closed to two minutes, as many riders were dropped from the peloton including the yellow jersey of Kristoff and Mads Pedersen. By the climb of the Col d'Eze with 40 km to go, the breakaway group had been caught and Nicolas Roche was the first over the top. With 13 km to go in the stage, on the day's final climb, Alaphilippe attacked and was joined by Adam Yates and Marc Hirschi. Led by the Jumbo squad of Primož Roglič and Tom Dumoulin, the peloton chased, but the trio managed to stay away on the descent and build a small gap. During the pursuit, Michał Kwiatkowski bumped into Dumoulin, causing a violent crash and interrupting the pace Team Jumbo was setting in pursuit of the breakaway. Approaching the finish line on the Promenade des Anglais, the peloton was only two seconds behind as Alaphilippe won the day and the yellow jersey for the second time in his career, as Hirschi, Yates, Greg Van Avermaet and Sergio Higuita rounded out the top 5.

Stage three departed the Allianz Riviera en route to Sisteron. Jérôme Cousin, Perez and Cosnefroy were involved in the breakaway, with the latter two racing for the right to wear the polka dot jersey in the early stages. Perez won enough points to take the jersey from Cosnefroy and was therefore in the virtual jersey when they both fell back from the group to rejoin the peloton, leaving Cousin on his own with over a hundred kilometres to go. Perez, however, crashed into his team car, and then the side of the mountain on the descent when the car suddenly stopped in front of him and he was forced to abandon the race. Cosnefroy retained the jersey as a result and would be in good position to defend it over the next few stages. Cousin was caught with 16 km to go. The sprint finish saw Sam Bennett appear to be in very good position to claim his first ever stage in the Tour de France when a late charging Ewan came by Sagan, Hugo Hofstetter, Giacomo Nizzolo as well as Bennett to take the win.

Stage four was anticipated to be the first test among the GC riders to see who was in the best form being as the stage finished with a climb. In the same region that Luis Ocaña had his famous solo breakaway in 1971. The breakaway of six riders formed and took the majority of the intermediate sprint and mountains points with one of the riders, Tiesj Benoot crashing and actually splitting his seatpost in two. Benoot avoided serious injury and continued the race as the breakaway eventually fragmented with the final escapee in Krists Neilands being caught as the final climb began. Wout van Aert and Sepp Kuss set the pacemaking late in the stage shaking off everyone but the group of favorites. Kuss drove a dominant pace all the way up the climb when with 500 meters to go Guillaume Martin attacked and Kuss peeled off as his teammate Roglič and the rest of the favorites pursued. Roglič won the stage definitively with Tadej Pogačar coming in 2nd, Martin finishing 3rd, Nairo Quintana in 4th and Alaphilippe finishing 5th retaining the yellow jersey. Other favorites in Defending champ Egan Bernal, Dumoulin, Lopez, Mikel Landa and 2nd place overall Adam Yates also came across in good order. Stage five was a flat stage in which several breakaways were attempted, but none actually succeeded. Cosnefroy grabbed the two points to stay in the polka dot jersey while Sam Bennett took the intermediate sprint points and finished 3rd at the finish line, behind Cees Bol and stage winner Wout van Aert, to claim the green jersey from Sagan. The yellow jersey also switched riders as race leader Julian Alaphilippe accepted food inside 20 km to go, which is a penalty for safety reasons, and was docked twenty seconds. As a result, Yates took over the maillot jaune, although he was less than pleased to learn that he was being awarded it in this manner as he stated, "Nobody wants to take the jersey like this. I was on the bus and we were about to leave for the hotel when I got the call.... tomorrow I'll give it everything to defend the jersey..." This was the second time being involved in a controversial swapping of the yellow jersey for Yates as during the 2016 edition when Chris Froome ended up running up Mont Ventoux Yates finished the stage and was temporarily officially in yellow by a few seconds over Froome, until after the stage was over and the Jury decided to give Froome the same time as Bauke Mollema who had also been involved in the incident, which allowed Froome to keep his lead.

Stage six began at Le Teil and finished at Mont Aigoual, a climb made famous by writer and semi-pro cyclist Tim Krabbé. The stage saw a large group of riders form an escape bunch including Van Avermaet, Roche, Cavagna, Powless, Herrada, Lutsenko, Oss and Edvald Boasson Hagen. Their gap eventually exceeded six minutes and Herrada, Van Avermaet, Lutsenko and Powless would survive to finish ahead of the peloton with Lutsenko riding away from everyone and soloing to victory. Yates would perform well and defend his yellow jersey with a three-second advantage over Roglič, with the majority of the other GC contenders about ten seconds behind him. Stage seven saw a major split in the main field due in part to the weather, with very high crosswinds creating splits in the peloton, and due to the extreme pace set very early on in the stage by the Ineos Grenadiers and Team Bora on the first climb of the day, who were trying to drop the competition of Peter Sagan who was aiming to reclaim the green jersey from Bennett. The plan worked out for both teams as not only were the sprinters and contenders for the stage win in Bennett, Nizzolo, Kristoff, Bol and Ewan left behind, but so were many of Bernal's competitors in the GC who lost over a minute by the end of the day. Riders who had their hopes at victory or a podium finish take a serious hit included Mollema, Pogačar, Landa, Porte and Carapaz while Bernal, Roglič, Dumoulin, Lopez, Yates, Urán, Pinot, Bardet, Quintana and Guillaume Martin survived in the lead group securing their position. The most significant breakaway attempt of the day came from veteran Belgian rider Thomas De Gendt, who rode solo for about 60 kilometers, but he was caught by the lead group long before the finish. At the finish line Wout van Aert took his second stage win in three days besting Boasson Hagen and Bryan Coquard at the line. Yates remained in the overall lead, Sagan was back in the green jersey and Bernal took the white jersey from Pogačar.

=== The second week and Pyrenees ===
Stage eight was a mountain stage where a breakaway of thirteen riders eventually formed and began to build a gap. Being as none of the escaped riders were a threat to the GC contenders the peloton allowed them to extend their advantage. The intermediate sprint was won by Cousin with Cosnefroy defending the polka dot jersey taking maximum points on the first climb of the day which was the infamous Col de Menté. With the gap back to the main field continuously growing it became clear the breakaway riders would fight amongst themselves for the stage win on the upcoming Port de Balès and Col de Peyresourde. Nans Peters and Ilnur Zakarin had the strongest legs and fought for the stage win, with Peters attacking and dropping Zakarin to solo to victory. Toms Skujiņš and Carlos Verona both rode strongly, and eventually caught and dropped Zakarin to round out the stage podium. Zakarin crossed 4th and in 5th was Neilson Powless, who wasn't even supposed to be in the breakaway as Team EF intended to get either Dani Martínez or Hugh Carthy into the break, but Powless was in the right place at the right time when the attacks came. When asked about it following the race he stated, "It's amazing... it's incredible. If my role was to sit in the group and support Rigo... I’d be happy, and that will be my role soon enough."

Among the GC contenders there were some shakeups, notably including top French contender Pinot seeing his chances slip away due to a back injury, Alaphilippe struggling and also losing over ten minutes and Tom Dumoulin losing two minutes. Gaining time was Tadej Pogačar, who attacked on the final climb making up some of the time he lost in the crosswinds the previous day, putting himself back into the top 10 in the process.

Stage nine was the second Pyreneean mountain stage. Four riders had abandoned the race the previous stage leaving 168 riders to sign in and start the stage. The breakaway attempts were thwarted from early on in the day as Jumbo and Ineos attempted to control and dictate the pace for the benefit of Roglič and Bernal. Cosnefroy jumped out front in the first 10 km in defense of the polka dot jersey and Swiss rider Marc Hirschi made a serious attack to escape but it never materialized. EF Pro Cycling and Trek–Segafredo also attempted to get a breakaway formed and Alaphilippe of Deceuninck–Quick-Step took a shot at trying to get away as well. Tom Dumoulin became the most powerful super-domestique in the race when he sacrificed himself for the team during the previous stage and in conjunction with the climbing abilities of George Bennett, Wout van Aert and Sepp Kuss team Jumbo was proving to be the strongest team in the Tour. For the previous decade it has unquestionably been Team Sky/Ineos Grenadiers, however they were missing both Chris Froome and Geraint Thomas. Even without these former champs Ineos was still a threat to defend as champs and the jockeying of these teams controlled the race until Marc Hirschi broke free with 90 km to go on the first Cat-1 climb of the day. About eight other riders tried bridging the gap up to him and formed an escape group including Thibaut Pinot attempting to set something up for his Groupama–FDJ teammates to go for a stage win, Sébastien Reichenbach among them. Also taking their shot was Warren Barguil, Omar Fraile, Lennard Kämna and Dani Martínez, but they were not able to catch Hirschi, who had a gap extending beyond +2:00 and was the only rider up the road. Fabio Aru of team UAE Team Emirates, who had come into the race as team leader, fell into difficulty and off the back leaving Pogačar, who was riding in his first Tour, as the GC hope for the team. At most Hirschi had a gap exceeding +4:30 but by the time he began the final climb on the Col de Marie-Blanque a minute had been shaved off that. Van Aert and Kuss of Team Jumbo–Visma viciously attacked the climb at the head of the elite group and as the summit approached Hirschi's lead had been cut to about +0:30. Pogačar launched an attack with about 3 km to go, which was answered by most of the GC riders but the yellow jersey of Adam Yates began to fall behind. Egan Bernal was the next rider to attack and of the final group only Roglič, Landa and Pogačar went with him. With 2 km to go Hirschi, who had been riding solo for 88 km, pulled up as he realized he had been caught. He was not dropped however, so hope for the stage win was not yet lost, and these five riders rode on towards the finish. Hirschi launched his sprint first, however Pogačar and Roglič bested him on the line with Pogačar becoming the youngest stage winner in decades and Roglič becoming the first Slovenian rider to wear the yellow jersey as the majority of the other GC riders limited their losses to about ten seconds or so, not including time bonuses. Bernal was now in 2nd +0:21 behind, Guillaume Martin was in 3rd at +0:28 with Quintana, Bardet, Uran and Pogačar not far behind him.

Following the rest day stage ten was slated to be a flat stage along the Atlantic coast from the island of Oléron to the island of Île de Ré. Before the start of the stage it was revealed that Director of the Tour de France Christian Prudhomme had tested positive for COVID-19. He was not in any contact with riders or team members so the race wasn't affected but he did move into isolation for seven days. The attacks came as soon as 'the race is on' was declared with Stefan Küng of Team FDJ and Michael Schär of CCC Team being the two riders who escaped the peloton. The pace of the main field was for the most part controlled by Deceuninck and Lotto–Soudal as they intended the stage to finish in a bunch sprint. It would as the escapees never extended their lead much beyond +2:00 and were back within the bunch about 70 kilometers into the race at which point team Ineos Grenadiers and EF Pro Cycling took control of the pace. There were a few crashes, including one between 7th place Pogačar and 3rd place Guillaume Martin, neither of whom lost time but they both had to put in a hard chase to get back to the group. Küng attacked again on the bridge to Île de Ré but was brought back and with 10 km to go the leadout trains began to form for the upcoming sprint. Coquard, Greipel, Pedersen and Elia Viviani were all there in the end but the podium was filled by Sagan, Ewan and Sam Bennett, who claimed his first stage win in the Tour de France. Bennett also reclaimed the green jersey from Sagan and would not relinquish the Maillot Vert for the rest of the Tour. This would end up becoming the first time Peter Sagan finished a Tour de France where he did not win the Points Competition.

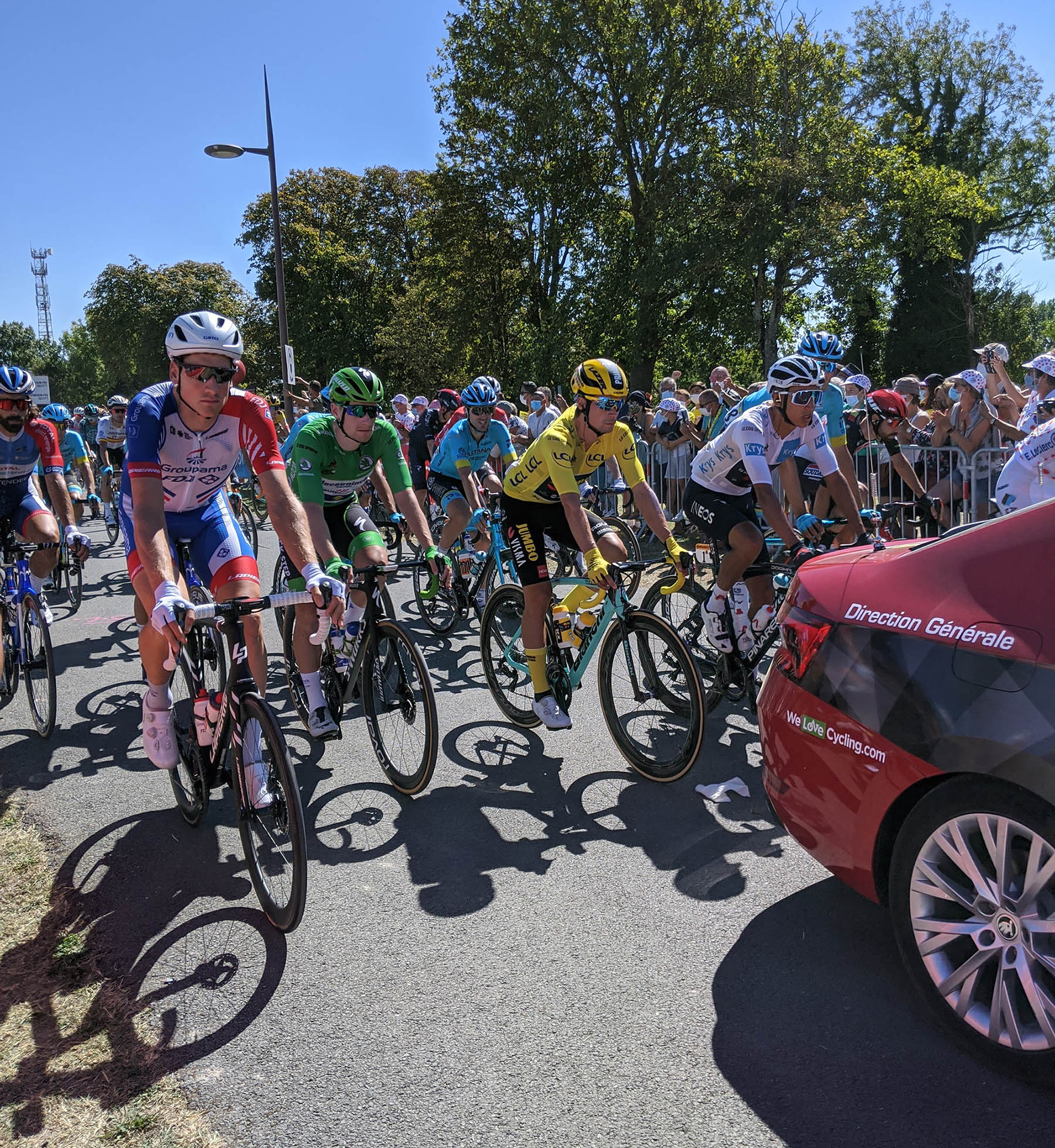
The front of the peloton near the start of stage 11, led by classification leaders Sam Bennett (green), Primož Roglič (yellow), and Egan Bernal (white)

Stage eleven was another flat stage suited perfectly for a bunch sprint and this is what it turned out to be once the Most Combative Rider and only breakaway rider in Mathieu Ladagnous was caught by the bunch. In the final kilometers the leadout trains formed for Sagan and Bennett, who were fighting for the green jersey, as well as those going for the stage win in Coquard, Hoffstetter, Pedersen, Ewan, Van Aert, Mezgec and Clément Venturini of AG2R La Mondiale who was being led out by Oliver Naesen. Ewan won the day in a photo-finish with Sagan initially finishing 2nd followed by Bennett in 3rd. Ewan said of the win, "Once you have one you want two, and now I have two. I want a third on the Champs-Élysées... I didn't know if I'd won because I threw my bike and was looking down... but sometimes you can just feel it." Sagan was found guilty of improper sprinting and relegated to the bottom of the standings for the stage. This decision moved Bennett up to 2nd for the stage and made a notable difference in the green jersey standings.

Stage twelve saw a six rider breakaway that was caught with less than 50 km to go, but the Most Combative Rider would not come from this escape group due to the way the stage ended. Team Sunweb had lost their GC hope in Tom Dumoulin in the off-season, and the rider they intended to support during the Tour, former green jersey winner Michael Matthews, was absent with injury so they had come into the race with nothing to hope for but stage wins. They had several riders survive in the final group and two of them attacked near the end of the stage but it was Marc Hirschi who was able to stay away. His teammates Roche, Benoot and Kragh-Andersen refused to cooperate with Reichenbach, Rolland, Schachmann, Quentin Pacher and the others trying to chase him down. After coming up just short twice already, Hirschi won the stage in convincing fashion with no changes coming in the overall situation.

Stage thirteen saw numerous breakaway attempts early in the day but none of them managed to escape. About 60 km into the stage a large group of strong riders managed to get away and work together to continuously extend their advantage. Seventeen riders in the total including Geschke, Madouas, Schachmann, Alaphilippe, Powless, Kämna, Dani Martínez and Pierre Rolland among others. As the stage progressed their advantage grew and eventually reached +11:00 before it started coming down meaning the stage winner would come from this group. Late in the stage Powless of Team EF would attack and be joined by Schachmann of Team Bora, but eventually both of them would fall back and it would be their teammates Martínez and Kämna who would fight for the stage win with Martínez taking the victory by surging ahead in the final hundred meters before it came down to a sprint. Back down the road in the overall situation Primož Roglič attacked in an effort to build on his small lead. His attack worked as many of the GC contenders lost half a minute or more. Pogačar joined Roglič and stayed with him, as a result jumping from 7th place to 2nd place while Bernal dropped to 3rd. Bardet came into the day in 4th but along with Mollema suffered a crash and had to abandon the race. Martin fell out of the top 10 as Richie Porte rode strongly and broke into the top 10 for the first time.

Stage fourteen was a 194-kilometer-long hilly stage with four categorized climbs, three small ones and a single Cat-2, the Col du Béal. It was a tailor-made stage for Sagan, who had won several stages like this throughout his career and had more stage wins than any other rider in the Tour. His team, Bora–Hansgrohe, intended to control the breakaways as well as the entire peloton in order to put him in position to win. The early breakaway consisted of Stefan Küng and Edward Theuns with Theuns winning the maximum intermediate sprint points and Küng dropping him on the climbs to claim the KOM points. They were caught after being away for about 100 km and the surviving peloton controlled the race from then on. Sagan was able to claim more points than Bennett in the sprints but Team Sunweb was working hard to control the bunch as they had several surviving riders including Benoot, Andersen, Hirschi and even their sprinter Cees Bol, virtually any one of whom would be capable of winning the stage. Inside 12 km to go numerous attacks came one after another from some of the strongest riders in the sport including Van Avermaet, Alaphilippe, Sagan, De Gendt, Benoot and Hirschi but all of these attempts were contained. The only rider to stay away was Søren Kragh Andersen who launched his attack with 3 km to go, which nobody was able to match. Andersen crossed the line alone claiming his first Tour stage win and +0:15 later Simone Consonni and Luka Mezgec rounded out the podium ahead of Peter Sagan who finished 4th. The overall situation at the end of the second week remained static. Roglič and Team Jumbo were firmly in command of the race as he maintained his lead of just under a minute on Pogačar and defending champ Bernal and just over a minute on Urán and Quintana. The hardest part of the Tour was just ahead however, as beginning in stage fifteen there would be four consecutive high mountain stages in the Alps, which would be followed by more climbing with a difficult individual time trial.

=== The third week: the Alps, the time trial and the Champs-Élysées ===
There were several attempts to get a breakaway formed early in stage fifteen but the accelerations of Sagan and Bennett fighting for intermediate sprint points frustrated all attempts. Eventually a group of eight would break free but they were unable to gain enough time to threaten for a stage win. Matteo Trentin of CCC Team, who was in 3rd place in the points competition, attacked the breakaway and gained a lead of about twenty seconds while claiming the maximum intermediate sprint points, but he was eventually caught by the other breakaway riders. Back down the road in the main field there was a fairly serious crash when Bob Jungels accidentally grazed the front tire of Sergio Higuita causing the latter to viciously crash into the pavement. He remounted and tried to ride on but before long the pain set in and Higuita realized he might have been seriously hurt and had to abandon. He was taken to the hospital as a precaution; fortunately x-rays showed no broken bones. Later in the stage Michael Gogl of NTT Pro Cycling broke clear of the other breakaway riders and built a bit of a gap. Eventually Pierre Rolland of B&B Hotels–Vital Concept would also leave the rest of the escapees behind to join Gogl. These two were the final two riders up the road when the group of favorites caught them at the foot of the final climb, the Col du Grand Colombier, with Rolland being awarded Most Combative Rider. On this climb Jumbo-Visma riders Van Aert, Bennett, Kuss and Dumoulin set a vicious pace that put many riders into serious difficulty including Guillaume Martin, Egan Bernal and Nairo Quintana. The climb was seventeen kilometers long and about halfway through Yates attacked and got away briefly, but was only able to stay away for a kilometer or so before he was caught. As it neared the final kilometer one of the only riders still strong enough to attack after the assault of the Jumbo-Visma riders was Richie Porte. He went clear and only Roglič, Pogačar and Miguel Ángel López went with him. In the end Pogačar accelerated ahead of Roglič to take the stage victory as Porte crossed 3rd +0:05 later with Lopez in 4th three seconds beyond Porte. Coming in +0:15 behind Roglič and Pogačar was Enric Mas, Sepp Kuss, who had put in much of the work for Roglič, Mikel Landa and Adam Yates with Rigoberto Urán and veteran rider Alejandro Valverde of Movistar Team a few seconds after that. Quintana was able to limit his losses and remain in the top 10, but Bernal was not and this effectively ended the championship reign of Team Ineos. Stage winner Pogačar commented after the stage, "I don't know what happened to Bernal, but Team Jumbo–Visma set a terrible pace and some riders paid for it." Overall Roglič was still in command of the maillot jaune by +0:40 over Pogačar and +1:34 over Rigoberto Urán, with López, Yates, Porte and Landa within about two minutes going into the final rest day.

Following the rest day the testing of the riders, trainers and staff continued as usual. Throughout the race a handful of staff from four different teams had come back positive but all 785 personnel inside the 'race bubble' tested negative prior to stage sixteen, so all 156 riders still in the race signed in to start. It was a mostly clear day, about 75 degrees and included five categorized climbs with two Cat-2's and a Cat-1 among them. With less climbing than other high mountain stages major changes in the GC were not anticipated, but there would be no shortage of riders hoping for a stage win. As such the attacks and breakaway attempts began almost as soon as 'the race is on' was declared. Eight kilometers into the stage Pinot, Alaphilippe, Richard Carapaz of Team Ineos and twenty-two other riders went clear. Nine kilometers later Carapaz attacked again shaking up this group. By the time of the sixty kilometer mark there were twenty-three riders in the breakaway. The surviving peloton was content to let this group get away as Tony Martin and Robert Gesink took their turns for Jumbo-Visma at the front of the main field. Eventually the breakaway would have a gap exceeding +12:00, which would continue to widen, but the size of the group would be whittled down as the race rolled on. With 35 kilometers to go Quentin Patcher attacked and rode off the front of the group. After following a long turn at the front by Andrey Amador four others rode off in pursuit of Patcher with Carapaz, Reichenbach, Kämna and Alaphilippe. Several of these riders had claimed KOM points but Benoît Cosnefroy would still be in the polka dot jersey at the end of the day. As the stage neared the finish nearly +17:00 separated the leaders on the road from the group of favorites and eighteen of the breakaway riders would finish ahead of the elite group. Lennard Kämna launched the decisive move reaching the finish line more than a minute ahead of Carapaz, who would be awarded the only red number for his combativeness. None of the breakaway riders were a threat to the overall leaders and there were no major attacks or changes in the standings among them.

Stage seventeen was the queen stage and being as it included two Cat-HC climbs where the riders would climb above 6,000 feet in elevation on both occasions, it was the type of stage which could decide the Tour. Right from the start about twenty riders broke clear either chasing sprint points or trying to form an escape bunch to go for the stage win. Among them Thomas De Gendt tried his luck to attack the breakaway and built a bit of a gap. By the time they reached the first climb, Col de la Madeleine five riders were at the front. Carapaz, Alaphilippe and Kämna were battling each other for the second day in a row and Gorka Izagirre and Dan Martin were right there among them. Kämna was the first to fall back as this group would have a gap of better than six minutes before it started coming down. Martin eventually got dropped as the gap to the breakaway continued to steadily wither due to Damiano Caruso and Pello Bilbao of Team Bahrain–McLaren driving a hard pace at the front of the yellow jersey group for the benefit of Mikel Landa. As a result, the next riders over the first climb were in the elite group and Pogačar took the 3rd place mountains points which was enough for him to take the polka dot jersey from Cosnefroy. Going up the final climb, the Col de la Loze Carapaz was the only rider left out front but his gap was being reduced with each passing kilometer. Carapaz was eventually caught and as the stage approached the finish the pace set by Roglič dropped all of the surviving contenders except for Porte, Pogačar, 'Superman' Lopez and his own teammate Sepp Kuss. It would be Lopez who launched the decisive move to claim the stage win and while both Roglič and Pogačar tried to chase him down he won the stage as Roglič added +0:15 to his lead over Pogačar and beyond that to everybody else in the race. Roglič now had a lead of +0:57 on Pogačar as Lopez jumped up to third on the podium at +1:26 behind. Porte, Yates, Uran and Landa were now all beyond +3:00 from Roglič, but separated from one another by barely twenty seconds.

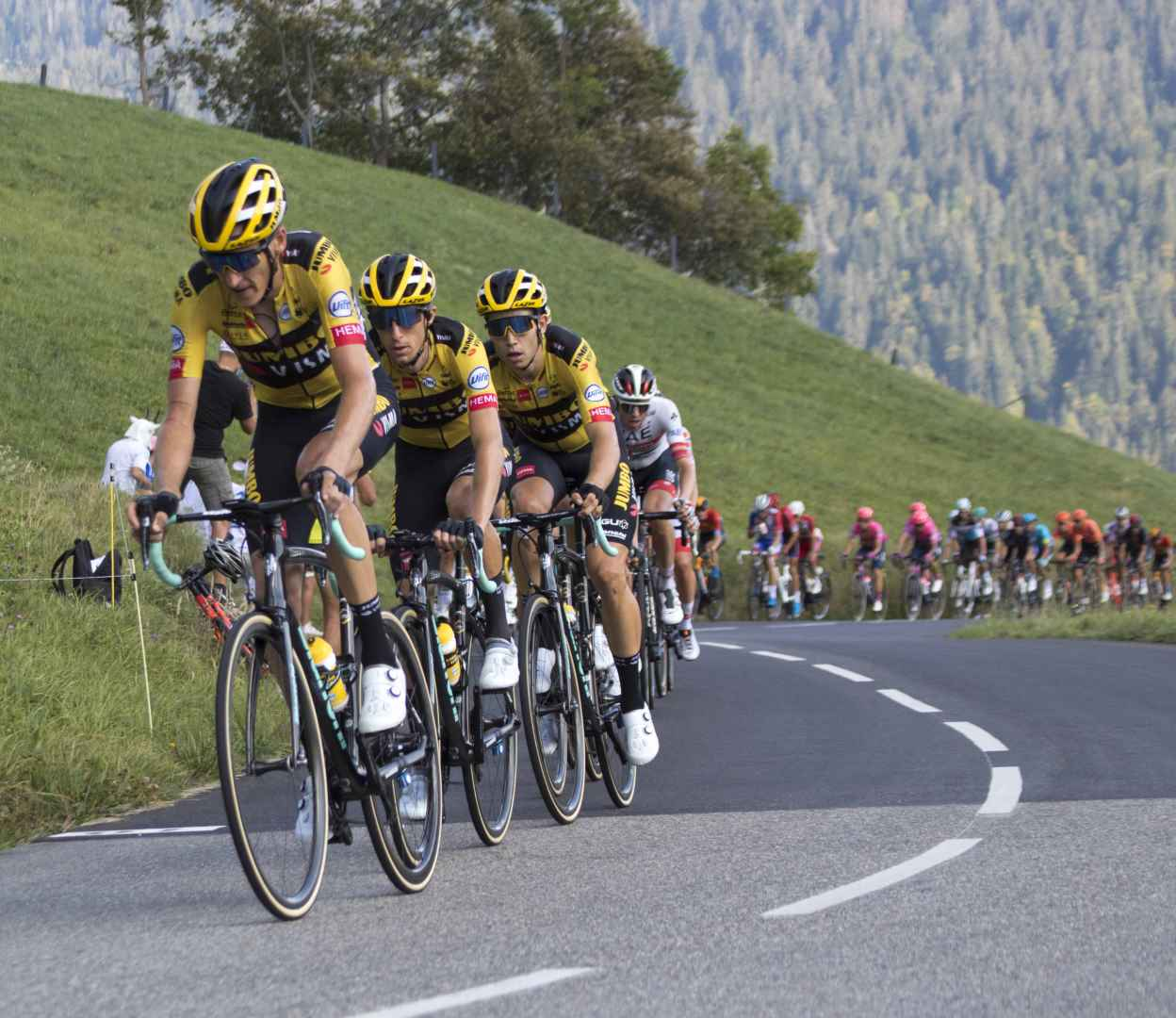
Team Jumbo–Visma lead the peloton on stage 18

Egan Bernal, Stefan Küng, Mikel Nieve and Jens Debusschere either did not start, did not finish or finished outside the time limit on stage seventeen leaving 150 riders to sign in at the start of stage eighteen. In the case of Mikel Nieve this was notable because prior to his abandon he had finished every grand tour he had started his entire career, eighteen of them in a row, and finished inside the top 25 of every one of them. There was a neutral start to the stage, but after this section was cleared 'the race is on' was declared and the attacks came quickly. Sagan and Bennett continued battling for the green jersey with Bennett extending his lead by another five points at the first sprint of the day. 32 riders broke clear initially, but on the first climb of the day it would be reduced to 19. About an hour into the stage the active rider with the 2nd most career wins, German rider André Greipel of Team Arkéa–Samsic, called it quits and abandoned. Carapaz, Alaphilippe and Marc Hirschi were fighting amongst themselves for KOM points being as they were all within striking distance of the polka dot jersey of Pogačar. Hirschi took some points early but he would eventually crash while trying to rejoin the breakaway group, which he would never get back to, although he would be named most combative rider for the third time in the Tour. In the end the day belonged to Team Ineos as the final surviving riders were both Ineos riders in Michał Kwiatkowski and Richard Carapaz. They both celebrated while casually cruising across the finish line with Kwiatkowski getting the stage victory and Carapaz securing the polka dot jersey from Pogačar. Among the GC riders Mikel Landa launched a furious attack to escape from the yellow jersey group and several highly placed riders lost time including Quintana, Yates and Uran. Richie Porte also fell back after getting a flat tire on the gravel section but he was able to make it back to the elite group meaning places 1-4 were the same as the previous day. 5th place was now occupied by Landa and in 6th place Enric Mas of Movistar Team was the only other rider within +5:00 of Roglič. With the high mountains finished Roglič seemed to be in a secure position as far as winning the Tour, but after the stage he was not about to declare the race over yet as he commented, "After the time trial there will be a decision known of the rankings but also tomorrow is another day to be really focused. It's far from being really safe."

Stage nineteen saw an early breakaway by Rémi Cavagna who attacked four kilometers into the stage. Not long after a chase group formed with the intent of bridging up to him. In this group was Geoffrey Soupe of Team Total Direct Énergie, Cyril Barthe, Dylan van Baarle and Max Walscheid. Also in this chase group was Guillaume Martin, although his presence was not welcome in the breakaway because he was highly placed in the general classification which meant the peloton would be far more likely to increase their pace to prevent any advantage where the escape group might threaten for the stage win. Martin however, did not care as he was concerned with winning the Tour de France, but once he realized he could not realistically break back into the top 10 he fell back into the bunch. By the halfway point of the stage all of these chase riders would be back in the fold as Cavagna was still up the road with about a two-minute gap. He too would be caught before long and then later in the stage another breakaway of twelve riders went off the front. In this group were the three riders fighting for the green jersey in Bennett, Sagan and Matteo Trentin, who was not far behind Sagan in the points competition, on this last stage to win serious points before the finale in Paris. Sagan attacked this group twice, trying to make it a decisive victory over Bennett but he could never break away. The only one who did break free was Søren Kragh Andersen who had gotten away from a similar breakaway group a week earlier. With sixteen kilometers left he got out in front and his advantage only grew from there. The Dane would win the stage by nearly a minute as Luka Mezgec and Jasper Stuyven rounded out the stage podium. The overall situation remained exactly the same going into the penultimate individual time trial of stage twenty.

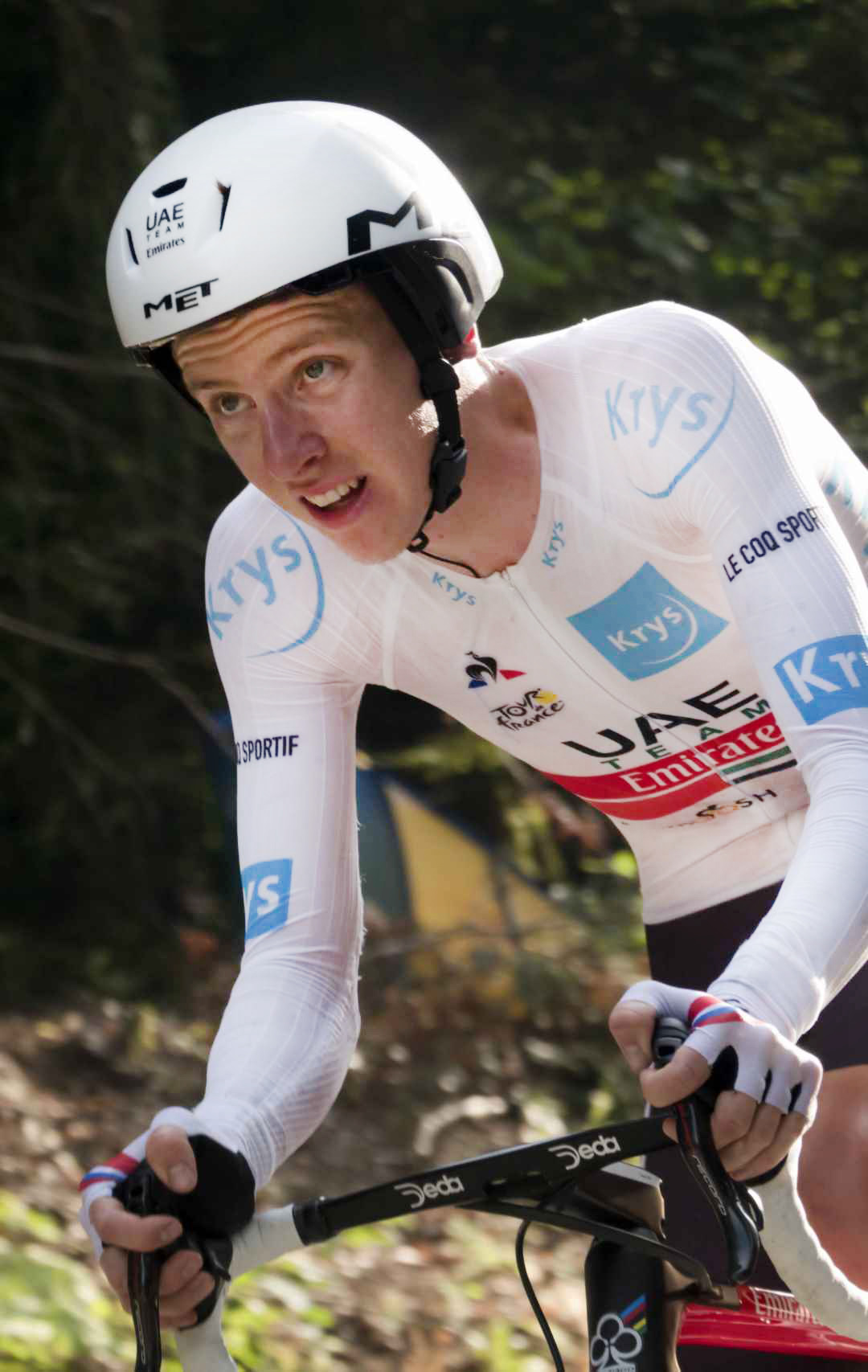
Tadej Pogačar riding the time trial on stage 20

Stage twenty was a 36.2 km (22.5 mi) long time trial up the La Planche des Belles Filles climb, 5.9 km (3.7 mi) in length with an average gradient of 8.5% and a maximum gradient of 14%. Of the early riders to complete the time trial, the best time of the day was put in by Rémi Cavagna, who would lead the race for several hours. Wout van Aert would eventually beat his time. Ninth place rider Tom Dumoulin would beat Van Aert's time by ten seconds to put himself in first position, placing him in serious contention for the stage win. Landa did not threaten to win the stage but rode strongly enough to jump to 4th place overall for the second time in his career. Fourth place rider Richie Porte, who fell short of Dumoulin's time by less than a second, moved into 3rd place overall. Porte took the final podium position, becoming just the second Australian rider to make a Tour de France podium. Lopez would fall to 5th place in the general classification. Primož Roglič, wearing the maillot jaune, was the final rider to take the start gate two minutes after 2nd place Pogačar. By the time he hit the first checkpoint he too was riding strongly, but was a few seconds behind Pogačar, who was absolutely flying by this point. The performance was touted as "historic" and received comparisons to the LeMond-Fignon tour finish. As Pogačar approached the finish it was all but certain that he was going to win his third stage, win the white jersey, take the polka dot jersey from Carapaz and win the Tour de France by close to, if not over a minute. Pogačar gained a minute and 56 seconds on Roglič, winning the stage, the general classification, mountains classification, and young rider's classification in the process. Pogačar became the first rider to win the tour on a penultimate time trial since Cadel Evans in 2011 and the first since Laurent Fignon to win the race in his Tour debut and the first since Eddy Merckx to win three jerseys in a single Tour.

Stage twenty one was the celebration ride into Paris for Pogačar and UAE Team Emirates. Once the circuit finish around the Champs-Élysées began the stage turned into the sprinters teams containing any attacks to see to it this coveted sprinters stage ended in a bunch sprint. As the finish approached Max Walscheid, Caleb Ewan, Wout van Aert, Bryan Coquard, former Champs-Élysées winner Alexander Kristoff of Team UAE, Elia Viviani of Team Cofidis and Hugo Hofstetter of Team Israel Start-Up Nation all fought their way to the front. But in the end Sagan Pedersen and Sam Bennett filled the podium, with Bennett taking the win.

The final podiums included Sam Bennett in the green jersey, Marc Hirschi as the Most Combative Rider and the team competition was won by Movistar Team for the 3rd year in a row. The white jersey, polka dot jersey and yellow jersey were all won by Tadej Pogačar.

== Classification leadership and minor prizes ==
Four main individual classifications and a team competition were contested in the race. The most important was the general classification, calculated by adding each rider's finishing times on each stage. Time bonuses (time subtracted) were awarded at the end of every stage apart from the time trial stages. The first three riders received 10, 6, and 4 seconds, respectively. In an effort to animate racing in the general classification, time bonuses of 8, 5, and 2 seconds respectively were also awarded for the first three riders across a mountain summit, given out on eight climbs. These occurred on stages 2, 6, 8, 9, 12, 13, 16, and 18. For crashes within the final 3 km (1.9 mi) of a stage, not including time trials and summit finishes, any rider involved received the same time as the group he was in when the crash occurred. The rider with the lowest cumulative time was the winner of the general classification and was considered to be the overall winner of the Tour.

Additionally, there was a points classification. Riders received points for finishing among the highest placed in a stage finish, or in intermediate sprints during the stage. The points available for each stage finish were determined by the stage's type, and sprints, with the first fifteen places in all receiving points. In flat stages, 50 points were given to the stage winner, down to 2 points for 15th place. In hilly stages, the winner gained 30 points, also down to 2 points. In mountain stages, individual time trials and intermediate sprints, 20 points were given to the winners, down to 1 point. The cyclist with the most points led the classification, and was identified with a green jersey.

There was also a mountains classification. Most stages of the race included one or more categorised climbs, in which points were awarded to the riders that reached the summit first. The climbs were categorised as fourth-, third-, second-, and first-category and hors catégorie, with the more difficult climbs rated lower. Mountains ranked hors catégorie gave 20 points to the first rider to cross the summit, down to 2 points to the 8th cyclist. For first-category climbs, 6 riders received points, with 10 for the first rider to reach the summit. Second-, third- and fourth-category climbs gave 5, 2 and 1 points to the first rider respectively. Double points were awarded at the top of the Méribel Col de la Loze in the seventeenth stage, the highest point in the 2020 Tour at 2,304 m (7,559 ft) above sea level. The cyclist with the most points led the classification, and wore a white jersey with red polka dots.

The final individual classification was the young rider classification, which was identical to the general classification, but including only riders under 26 years. In order to compete in the classification, riders were required to be born after 1 January 1995. The leader of the young rider classification wore a white jersey.

The classification for the teams was calculated by adding together the times of the first three cyclists of a team on each stage; the leading team was the one with the lowest cumulative time. The number of stage victories and placings per team determined the outcome of a tie. The riders on the team that led this classification were identified with yellow number bibs on the back of their jerseys and yellow helmets.

In addition, there was a combativity award given after each stage to the rider considered, by a jury, to have "made the greatest effort and who demonstrated the best qualities of sportsmanship". No combativity awards were given for the time trials and the final stage. The winner wore a red number bib for the following stage. At the conclusion of the Tour, the overall super-combativity award was awarded by a jury.

A total of €2,293,000 was awarded in cash prizes in the race. The overall winner of the general classification received €500,000, with the second and third placed riders receiving €200,000 and €100,000 respectively. All finishers in the top 160 were awarded money. The holders of the classifications were awarded on each stage they led; the final winners of the points and mountains were awarded €25,000, while the best young rider and most combative rider were awarded €20,000. The team classification winners earned €50,000. €11,000 was awarded to the winners of each stage of the race, with smaller amounts given to places 2–20. There was also a special award with a prize of €5000: the Souvenir Henri Desgrange, given to the first rider to pass the summit of the highest climb in the Tour, the Col de la Loze on stage 17.

Classification leadership by stage
Stage	Winner	General classification	Points classification	Mountains classification	Young rider classification	Team classification	Combativity award
1	Alexander Kristoff	Alexander Kristoff	Alexander Kristoff	Fabien Grellier	Mads Pedersen	Trek–Segafredo	Michael Schär
2	Julian Alaphilippe	Julian Alaphilippe	Alexander Kristoff	Benoît Cosnefroy	Marc Hirschi	Trek–Segafredo	Benoît Cosnefroy
3	Caleb Ewan	Julian Alaphilippe	Peter Sagan	Benoît Cosnefroy	Marc Hirschi	Trek–Segafredo	Jérôme Cousin
4	Primož Roglič	Julian Alaphilippe	Peter Sagan	Benoît Cosnefroy	Tadej Pogačar	EF Pro Cycling	Krists Neilands
5	Wout van Aert	Adam Yates	Sam Bennett	Benoît Cosnefroy	Tadej Pogačar	EF Pro Cycling	Wout Poels
6	Alexey Lutsenko	Adam Yates	Sam Bennett	Benoît Cosnefroy	Tadej Pogačar	EF Pro Cycling	Nicolas Roche
7	Wout van Aert	Adam Yates	Peter Sagan	Benoît Cosnefroy	Egan Bernal	EF Pro Cycling	Daniel Oss
8	Nans Peters	Adam Yates	Peter Sagan	Benoît Cosnefroy	Egan Bernal	EF Pro Cycling	Nans Peters
9	Tadej Pogačar	Primož Roglič	Peter Sagan	Benoît Cosnefroy	Egan Bernal	Movistar Team	Marc Hirschi
10	Sam Bennett	Primož Roglič	Sam Bennett	Benoît Cosnefroy	Egan Bernal	Movistar Team	Stefan Küng
11	Caleb Ewan	Primož Roglič	Sam Bennett	Benoît Cosnefroy	Egan Bernal	Movistar Team	Mathieu Ladagnous
12	Marc Hirschi	Primož Roglič	Sam Bennett	Benoît Cosnefroy	Egan Bernal	Movistar Team	Marc Hirschi
13	Daniel Martínez	Primož Roglič	Sam Bennett	Benoît Cosnefroy	Tadej Pogačar	EF Pro Cycling	Maximilian Schachmann
14	Søren Kragh Andersen	Primož Roglič	Sam Bennett	Benoît Cosnefroy	Tadej Pogačar	EF Pro Cycling	Stefan Küng
15	Tadej Pogačar	Primož Roglič	Sam Bennett	Benoît Cosnefroy	Tadej Pogačar	Movistar Team	Pierre Rolland
16	Lennard Kämna	Primož Roglič	Sam Bennett	Benoît Cosnefroy	Tadej Pogačar	Movistar Team	Richard Carapaz
17	Miguel Ángel López	Primož Roglič	Sam Bennett	Tadej Pogačar	Tadej Pogačar	Movistar Team	Julian Alaphilippe
18	Michał Kwiatkowski	Primož Roglič	Sam Bennett	Richard Carapaz	Tadej Pogačar	Movistar Team	Marc Hirschi
19	Søren Kragh Andersen	Primož Roglič	Sam Bennett	Richard Carapaz	Tadej Pogačar	Movistar Team	Rémi Cavagna
20	Tadej Pogačar	Tadej Pogačar	Sam Bennett	Tadej Pogačar	Tadej Pogačar	Movistar Team	no award
21	Sam Bennett	Tadej Pogačar	Sam Bennett	Tadej Pogačar	Tadej Pogačar	Movistar Team	no award
Final		Tadej Pogačar	Sam Bennett	Tadej Pogačar	Tadej Pogačar	Movistar Team	Marc Hirschi

- On stage 2, Peter Sagan, who was third in the points classification, wore the green jersey, because first placed Alexander Kristoff wore the yellow jersey as leader of the general classification, and second placed Mads Pedersen wore the white jersey as the leader of the young rider classification.
- On stage 18, Enric Mas, who was second in the young rider classification, wore the white jersey, because first placed Tadej Pogačar wore the polka-dot jersey as the leader of the mountains classification.
- On stage 21, Enric Mas, who was second in the young rider classification, wore the white jersey, because first placed Tadej Pogačar wore the yellow jersey as the leader of the general classification. For the same reason, Richard Carapaz, who was second in the mountains classification, wore the polka-dot jersey.

== Final classification standings ==
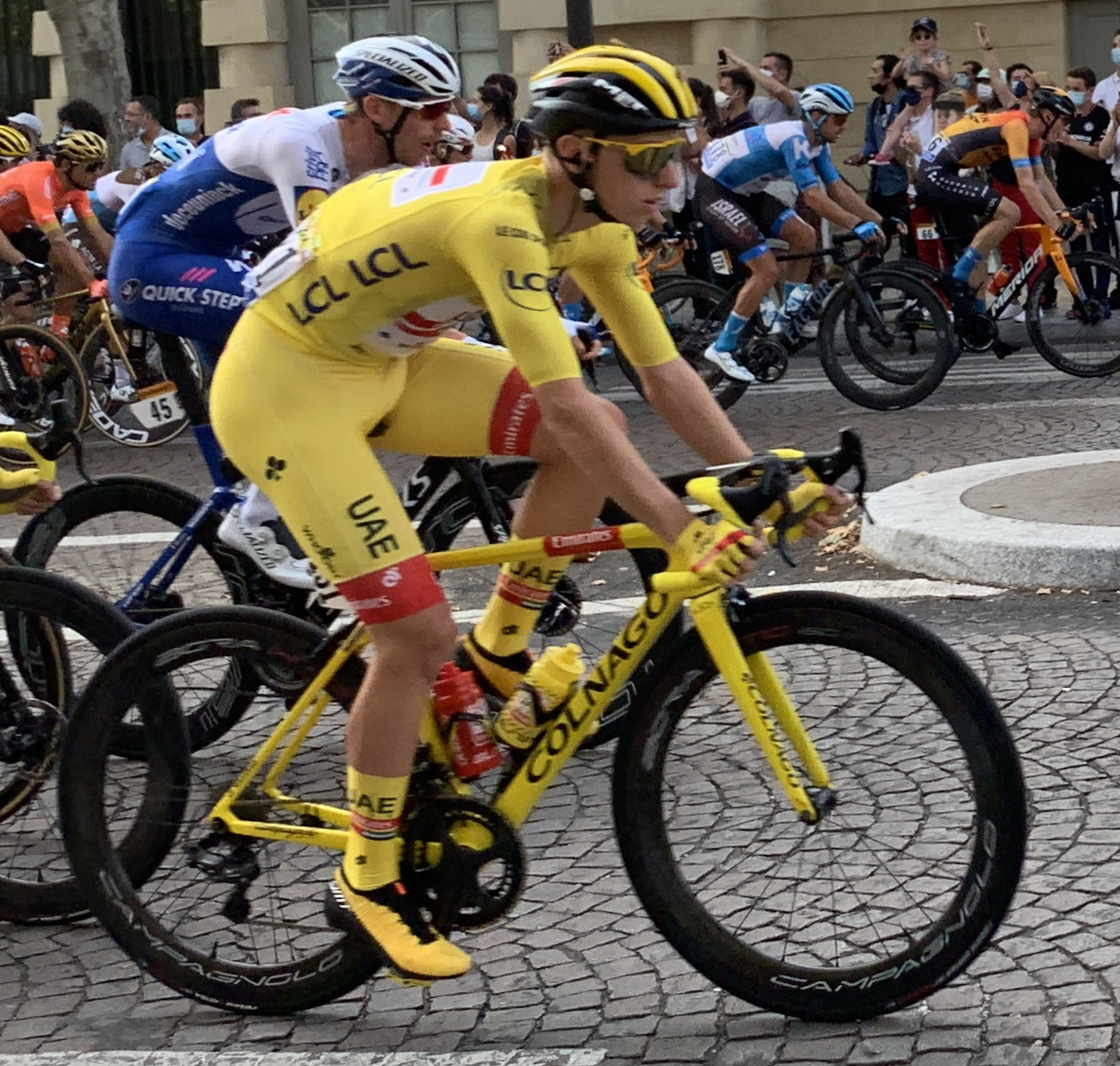
Winner of the general classification Tadej Pogačar (pictured in Paris on stage 21)

Legend
A yellow jersey.	Denotes the winner of the general classification	A white jersey with red polka dots.	Denotes the winner of the mountains classification
A green jersey.	Denotes the winner of the points classification	A white jersey.	Denotes the winner of the young rider classification
A white jersey with a yellow number bib.	Denotes the winner of the team classification	A white jersey with a red number bib.	Denotes the winner of the combativity award

=== General classification ===
Final general classification (1–10)
Rank	Rider	Team	Time
1	Tadej Pogačar (SLO)	UAE Team Emirates	87h 20' 05"
2	Primož Roglič (SLO)	Team Jumbo–Visma	+ 59"
3	Richie Porte (AUS)	Trek–Segafredo	+ 3' 30"
4	Mikel Landa (ESP)	Bahrain–McLaren	+ 5' 58"
5	Enric Mas (ESP)	Movistar Team	+ 6' 07"
6	Miguel Ángel López (COL)	Astana	+ 6' 47"
7	Tom Dumoulin (NED)	Team Jumbo–Visma	+ 7' 48"
8	Rigoberto Urán (COL)	EF Pro Cycling	+ 8' 02"
9	Adam Yates (GBR)	Mitchelton–Scott	+ 9' 25"
10	Damiano Caruso (ITA)	Bahrain–McLaren	+ 14' 03"

Final general classification (11–146)
Rank	Rider	Team	Time
11	Guillaume Martin (FRA)	Cofidis	+ 16' 58"
12	Alejandro Valverde (ESP)	Movistar Team	+ 17' 41"
13	Richard Carapaz (ECU)	INEOS Grenadiers	+ 25' 53"
14	Warren Barguil (FRA)	Arkéa–Samsic	+ 31' 04"
15	Sepp Kuss (USA)	Team Jumbo–Visma	+ 42' 20"
16	Pello Bilbao (ESP)	Bahrain–McLaren	+ 55' 56"
17	Nairo Quintana (COL)	Arkéa–Samsic	+ 1h 03' 07"
18	Pierre Rolland (FRA)	B&B Hotels–Vital Concept	+ 1h 08' 26"
19	Carlos Verona (ESP)	Movistar Team	+ 1h 19' 54"
20	Wout van Aert (BEL)	Team Jumbo–Visma	+ 1h 20' 31"
21	Marc Soler (ESP)	Movistar Team	+ 1h 31' 53"
22	Gorka Izagirre (ESP)	Astana	+ 1h 36' 12"
23	Esteban Chaves (COL)	Mitchelton–Scott	+ 1h 38' 45"
24	Sébastien Reichenbach (SUI)	Groupama–FDJ	+ 1h 39' 27"
25	Kenny Elissonde (FRA)	Trek–Segafredo	+ 1h 40' 06"
26	Mikaël Cherel (FRA)	AG2R La Mondiale	+ 1h 40' 51"
27	Valentin Madouas (FRA)	Groupama–FDJ	+ 1h 42' 43"
28	Daniel Martínez (COL)	EF Pro Cycling	+ 1h 55' 12"
29	Thibaut Pinot (FRA)	Groupama–FDJ	+ 1h 59' 54"
30	Michał Kwiatkowski (POL)	INEOS Grenadiers	+ 2h 06' 32"
31	Romain Sicard (FRA)	Total Direct Énergie	+ 2h 13' 02"
32	Luis León Sánchez (ESP)	Astana	+ 2h 13' 47"
33	Lennard Kämna (GER)	Bora–Hansgrohe	+ 2h 15' 39"
34	George Bennett (NZL)	Team Jumbo–Visma	+ 2h 15' 49"
35	Alexis Vuillermoz (FRA)	AG2R La Mondiale	+ 2h 16' 19"
36	Julian Alaphilippe (FRA)	Deceuninck–Quick-Step	+ 2h 19' 11"
37	Hugh Carthy (GBR)	EF Pro Cycling	+ 2h 20' 31"
38	Emanuel Buchmann (GER)	Bora–Hansgrohe	+ 2h 21' 57"
39	Rudy Molard (FRA)	Groupama–FDJ	+ 2h 26' 53"
40	Jan Polanc (SLO)	UAE Team Emirates	+ 2h 29' 54"
41	Dan Martin (IRL)	Israel Start-Up Nation	+ 2h 30' 25"
42	Robert Gesink (NED)	Team Jumbo–Visma	+ 2h 30' 35"
43	Bob Jungels (LUX)	Deceuninck–Quick-Step	+ 2h 33' 30"
44	Jesús Herrada (ESP)	Cofidis	+ 2h 34' 50"
45	Harold Tejada (COL)	Astana	+ 2h 37' 02"
46	Alexey Lutsenko (KAZ)	Astana	+ 2h 39' 37"
47	Hugo Houle (CAN)	Astana	+ 2h 39' 54"
48	Simon Geschke (GER)	CCC Team	+ 2h 44' 27"
49	Nicolas Edet (FRA)	Cofidis	+ 2h 48' 44"
50	Greg Van Avermaet (BEL)	CCC Team	+ 2h 49' 50"
51	Niklas Eg (DEN)	Trek–Segafredo	+ 2h 50' 04"
52	Thomas De Gendt (BEL)	Lotto–Soudal	+ 2h 51' 56"
53	Quentin Pacher (FRA)	B&B Hotels–Vital Concept	+ 2h 54' 17"
54	Marc Hirschi (SUI)	Team Sunweb	+ 2h 54' 34"
55	Nelson Oliveira (POR)	Movistar Team	+ 3h 01' 41"
56	Neilson Powless (USA)	EF Pro Cycling	+ 3h 03' 09"
57	Maximilian Schachmann (GER)	Bora–Hansgrohe	+ 3h 03' 28"
58	Søren Kragh Andersen (DEN)	Team Sunweb	+ 3h 06' 26"
59	Dylan van Baarle (NED)	INEOS Grenadiers	+ 3h 07' 42"
60	Omar Fraile (ESP)	Astana	+ 3h 13' 41"
61	Oliver Naesen (BEL)	AG2R La Mondiale	+ 3h 22' 04"
62	Alberto Bettiol (ITA)	EF Pro Cycling	+ 3h 24' 55"
63	Felix Großschartner (AUT)	Bora–Hansgrohe	+ 3h 25' 17"
64	Nicolas Roche (IRL)	Team Sunweb	+ 3h 27' 13"
65	Nans Peters (FRA)	AG2R La Mondiale	+ 3h 27' 46"
66	Winner Anacona (COL)	Arkéa–Samsic	+ 3h 32' 40"
67	Jan Hirt (CZE)	CCC Team	+ 3h 34' 58"
68	Ben Hermans (BEL)	Israel Start-Up Nation	+ 3h 37' 12"
69	Michael Schär (SUI)	CCC Team	+ 3h 38' 55"
70	José Joaquín Rojas (ESP)	Movistar Team	+ 3h 40' 49"
71	Jasper Stuyven (BEL)	Trek–Segafredo	+ 3h 40' 52"
72	David de la Cruz (ESP)	UAE Team Emirates	+ 3h 41' 20"
73	Michael Valgren (DEN)	NTT Pro Cycling	+ 3h 41' 45"
74	Imanol Erviti (ESP)	Movistar Team	+ 3h 48' 00"
75	Tiesj Benoot (BEL)	Team Sunweb	+ 3h 48' 50"
76	Matej Mohorič (SLO)	Bahrain–McLaren	+ 3h 49' 02"
77	Andrey Amador (CRC)	INEOS Grenadiers	+ 3h 49' 04"
78	Cyril Gautier (FRA)	B&B Hotels–Vital Concept	+ 3h 51' 57"
79	Matteo Trentin (ITA)	CCC Team	+ 3h 52' 10"
80	Dario Cataldo (ITA)	Movistar Team	+ 3h 52' 51"
81	Toms Skujiņš (LAT)	Trek–Segafredo	+ 3h 53' 09"
82	Vegard Stake Laengen (NOR)	UAE Team Emirates	+ 3h 53' 17"
83	Jack Bauer (NZL)	Mitchelton–Scott	+ 4h 00' 34"
84	Peter Sagan (SVK)	Bora–Hansgrohe	+ 4h 04' 15"
85	Krists Neilands (LAT)	Israel Start-Up Nation	+ 4h 11' 03"
86	Pierre-Luc Périchon (FRA)	Cofidis	+ 4h 14' 28"
87	Pavel Sivakov (RUS)	INEOS Grenadiers	+ 4h 15' 38"
88	Luka Mezgec (SLO)	Mitchelton–Scott	+ 4h 17' 07"
89	Jens Keukeleire (BEL)	EF Pro Cycling	+ 4h 18' 47"
90	Dries Devenyns (BEL)	Deceuninck–Quick-Step	+ 4h 20' 41"
91	Tejay van Garderen (USA)	EF Pro Cycling	+ 4h 22' 20"
92	Casper Pedersen (DEN)	Team Sunweb	+ 4h 24' 13"
93	Sonny Colbrelli (ITA)	Bahrain–McLaren	+ 4h 24' 42"
94	Mathieu Ladagnous (FRA)	Groupama–FDJ	+ 4h 24' 52"
95	Dayer Quintana (COL)	Arkéa–Samsic	+ 4h 25' 50"
96	Cyril Barthe (FRA)	B&B Hotels–Vital Concept	+ 4h 27' 07"
97	Daryl Impey (RSA)	Mitchelton–Scott	+ 4h 28' 39"
98	Tom Van Asbroeck (BEL)	Israel Start-Up Nation	+ 4h 33' 17"
99	Christopher Juul-Jensen (DEN)	Mitchelton–Scott	+ 4h 34' 03"
100	Alessandro De Marchi (ITA)	CCC Team	+ 4h 34' 06"
101	Edvald Boasson Hagen (NOR)	NTT Pro Cycling	+ 4h 34' 19"
102	Kévin Ledanois (FRA)	Arkéa–Samsic	+ 4h 35' 48"
103	Joris Nieuwenhuis (NED)	Team Sunweb	+ 4h 38' 50"
104	Clément Venturini (FRA)	AG2R La Mondiale	+ 4h 39' 08"
105	Daniel Oss (ITA)	Bora–Hansgrohe	+ 4h 40' 46"
106	Connor Swift (GBR)	Arkéa–Samsic	+ 4h 41' 59"
107	Christophe Laporte (FRA)	Cofidis	+ 4h 44' 30"
108	Anthony Turgis (FRA)	Total Direct Énergie	+ 4h 44' 57"
109	Roman Kreuziger (CZE)	NTT Pro Cycling	+ 4h 45' 26"
110	Wout Poels (NED)	Bahrain–McLaren	+ 4h 47' 23"
111	Marco Marcato (ITA)	UAE Team Emirates	+ 4h 48' 47"
112	Simone Consonni (ITA)	Cofidis	+ 4h 53' 50"
113	Rémi Cavagna (FRA)	Deceuninck–Quick-Step	+ 4h 58' 46"
114	Kasper Asgreen (DEN)	Deceuninck–Quick-Step	+ 5h 00' 04"
115	Hugo Hofstetter (FRA)	Israel Start-Up Nation	+ 5h 00' 14"
116	Benoît Cosnefroy (FRA)	AG2R La Mondiale	+ 5h 00' 43"
117	Fabien Grellier (FRA)	Total Direct Énergie	+ 5h 01' 32"
118	Tony Martin (GER)	Team Jumbo–Visma	+ 5h 05' 28"
119	Edward Theuns (BEL)	Trek–Segafredo	+ 5h 08' 10"
120	Nils Politt (GER)	Israel Start-Up Nation	+ 5h 09' 02"
121	Ryan Gibbons (RSA)	NTT Pro Cycling	+ 5h 09' 32"
122	Bryan Coquard (FRA)	B&B Hotels–Vital Concept	+ 5h 10' 32"
123	Geoffrey Soupe (FRA)	Total Direct Énergie	+ 5h 10' 40"
124	Mads Pedersen (DEN)	Trek–Segafredo	+ 5h 11' 03"
125	Jonas Koch (GER)	CCC Team	+ 5h 12' 04"
126	Nikias Arndt (GER)	Team Sunweb	+ 5h 13' 11"
127	Tim Declercq (BEL)	Deceuninck–Quick-Step	+ 5h 14' 52"
128	Amund Grøndahl Jansen (NOR)	Team Jumbo–Visma	+ 5h 17' 28"
129	Luke Rowe (GBR)	INEOS Grenadiers	+ 5h 17' 50"
130	Michael Mørkøv (DEN)	Deceuninck–Quick-Step	+ 5h 26' 21"
131	Mathieu Burgaudeau (FRA)	Total Direct Énergie	+ 5h 27' 38"
132	Alexander Kristoff (NOR)	UAE Team Emirates	+ 5h 28' 28"
133	Clément Russo (FRA)	Arkéa–Samsic	+ 5h 28' 45"
134	Max Walscheid (GER)	NTT Pro Cycling	+ 5h 29' 38"
135	Elia Viviani (ITA)	Cofidis	+ 5h 30' 01"
136	Maxime Chevalier (FRA)	B&B Hotels–Vital Concept	+ 5h 31' 30"
137	Kévin Reza (FRA)	B&B Hotels–Vital Concept	+ 5h 31' 37"
138	Sam Bennett (IRL)	Deceuninck–Quick-Step	+ 5h 32' 33"
139	Guy Niv (ISR)	Israel Start-Up Nation	+ 5h 34' 43"
140	Cees Bol (NED)	Team Sunweb	+ 5h 38' 16"
141	Niccolò Bonifazio (ITA)	Total Direct Énergie	+ 5h 42' 13"
142	Jasper De Buyst (BEL)	Lotto–Soudal	+ 5h 43' 07"
143	Marco Haller (AUT)	Bahrain–McLaren	+ 5h 46' 27"
144	Caleb Ewan (AUS)	Lotto–Soudal	+ 5h 50' 25"
145	Frederik Frison (BEL)	Lotto–Soudal	+ 6h 01' 48"
146	Roger Kluge (GER)	Lotto–Soudal	+ 6h 07' 02"

=== Points classification ===
Final points classification (1–10)
Rank	Rider	Team	Points
1	Sam Bennett (IRL)	Deceuninck–Quick-Step	380
2	Peter Sagan (SVK)	Bora–Hansgrohe	284
3	Matteo Trentin (ITA)	CCC Team	260
4	Bryan Coquard (FRA)	B&B Hotels–Vital Concept	181
5	Wout van Aert (BEL)	Team Jumbo–Visma	174
6	Caleb Ewan (AUS)	Lotto–Soudal	170
7	Julian Alaphilippe (FRA)	Deceuninck–Quick-Step	150
8	Tadej Pogačar (SLO)	UAE Team Emirates	143
9	Søren Kragh Andersen (DEN)	Team Sunweb	138
10	Michael Mørkøv (DEN)	Deceuninck–Quick-Step	138

=== Mountains classification ===
Final mountains classification (1–10)
Rank	Rider	Team	Points
1	Tadej Pogačar (SLO)	UAE Team Emirates	82
2	Richard Carapaz (ECU)	INEOS Grenadiers	74
3	Primož Roglič (SLO)	Team Jumbo–Visma	67
4	Marc Hirschi (SUI)	Team Sunweb	62
5	Miguel Ángel López (COL)	Astana	51
6	Benoît Cosnefroy (FRA)	AG2R La Mondiale	36
7	Pierre Rolland (FRA)	B&B Hotels–Vital Concept	36
8	Richie Porte (AUS)	Trek–Segafredo	36
9	Nans Peters (FRA)	AG2R La Mondiale	32
10	Lennard Kämna (GER)	Bora–Hansgrohe	27

=== Young rider classification ===
Final young rider classification (1–10)
Rank	Rider	Team	Time
1	Tadej Pogačar (SLO)	UAE Team Emirates	87h 20' 05"
2	Enric Mas (ESP)	Movistar Team	+ 6' 07"
3	Valentin Madouas (FRA)	Groupama–FDJ	+ 1h 42' 43"
4	Daniel Martínez (COL)	EF Pro Cycling	+ 1h 55' 12"
5	Lennard Kämna (GER)	Bora–Hansgrohe	+ 2h 15' 39"
6	Harold Tejada (COL)	Astana	+ 2h 37' 02"
7	Niklas Eg (DEN)	Trek–Segafredo	+ 2h 50' 04"
8	Marc Hirschi (SUI)	Team Sunweb	+ 2h 54' 34"
9	Neilson Powless (USA)	EF Pro Cycling	+ 3h 03' 09"
10	Pavel Sivakov (RUS)	INEOS Grenadiers	+ 4h 15' 38"

=== Team classification ===
Final team classification (1–10)
Rank	Team	Time
1	(Spain) Movistar Team	262h 14' 58"
2	(Netherlands) Team Jumbo–Visma	+ 18' 31"
3	Bahrain–McLaren	+ 57' 10"
4	(United States) EF Pro Cycling	+ 1h 16' 43"
5	(United Kingdom) INEOS Grenadiers	+ 1h 32' 01"
6	(United States) Trek–Segafredo	+ 1h 39' 39"
7	(Kazakhstan) Astana	+ 1h 47' 15"
8	(France) AG2R La Mondiale	+ 2h 58' 47"
9	(United Arab Emirates) UAE Team Emirates	+ 3h 06' 46"
10	(Australia) Mitchelton–Scott	+ 3h 25' 10"

== Bibliography ==
- Race regulations (PDF). Paris: Amaury Sport Organisation. 2020.
- UCI cycling regulations (PDF). Part 2, road races. Aigle, Switzerland: Union Cycliste Internationale. 12 June 2020.
