= 2023 Trofeo Laigueglia =

2023 UCI ProSeries

Race details
- Dates: 1 March 2023
- Stages: 1
- Distance: 201.3 km (125.1 mi)
- Winning time: 5h 08' 28"

Results
	Winner	Nans Peters (FRA)	(AG2R Citroën Team)
	Second	Andrea Vendrame (ITA)	(AG2R Citroën Team)
	Third	Alessandro Covi (ITA)	(UAE Team Emirates)

The 2023 Trofeo Laigueglia was a one-day road cycling race that took place on 1 March 2023 in and around Laigueglia. It was the 60th edition of the Trofeo Laigueglia and was rated as a 1.Pro event as part the 2023 UCI ProSeries.

== Teams ==
Twenty teams were invited to the race. There were nine UCI WorldTour teams, six UCI ProTeams, and five UCI Continental teams. Of the starting peloton of 135 riders, only 35 finished.

UCI WorldTeams

- AG2R Citroën Team
- Arkéa–Samsic
- Cofidis
- EF Education–EasyPost
- Groupama–FDJ
- Ineos Grenadiers
- Intermarché–Circus–Wanty
- Trek–Segafredo
- UAE Team Emirates

UCI ProTeams

- Green Project–Bardiani–CSF–Faizanè
- Bingoal WB
- Eolo–Kometa
- Lotto–Dstny
- Team Corratec
- Team Novo Nordisk

UCI Continental teams

- Beltrami TSA–Tre Colli
- Biesse–Carrera
- General Store–Essegibi–Fratelli Curia
- Team Colpack–Ballan
- Team Technipes #inEmiliaRomagna

== Result ==
Result
Rank	Rider	Team	Time
1	Nans Peters (FRA)	AG2R Citroën Team	5h 02' 25"
2	Andrea Vendrame (ITA)	AG2R Citroën Team	+ 46"
3	Alessandro Covi (ITA)	UAE Team Emirates	+ 46"
4	Lorenzo Rota (ITA)	Intermarché–Circus–Wanty	+ 46"
5	Clément Champoussin (FRA)	Arkéa–Samsic	+ 46"
6	Romain Grégoire (FRA)	Groupama–FDJ	+ 46"
7	Jefferson Alexander Cepeda (ECU)	EF Education–EasyPost	+ 1' 33"
8	Benoît Cosnefroy (FRA)	AG2R Citroën Team	+ 1' 46"
9	Diego Ulissi (ITA)	UAE Team Emirates	+ 1' 55"
10	Georg Zimmermann (GER)	Intermarché–Circus–Wanty	+ 1' 55"
