= Vivian (personal name) =

- Pronunciation: /vɪviˈɛn/ viv-ee-EN /ˈvɪviən/ VIV-ee-ən
- Gender: Unisex

Origin
- Origin: Latin
- Region of origin: Western Christianity (Western Roman Empire)

Other names
- Related names: Vivien, Viviana, Viviane, Vivienne, Vivianne, Bibiana, Bibiane

Vivian (and variants such as Vivien and Vivienne) is a given name, and less often a surname, derived from a Latin name of the Roman Empire period, masculine Vivianus and feminine Viviana, which survived into modern use because it is the name of two early Christian female martyrs as well as of a male saint and bishop.

== History and variants ==
The Latin name Vivianus is recorded from the 1st century. It is ultimately related to the adjective vivus "alive", but it is formed from the compound form vivi- and the adjectival -ānus suffix used to form cognomina.

The latinate given name Vivianus was of limited popularity in the medieval period in reference to Saint Vivianus, a 5th-century bishop of Saintes; the feminine name was that of Saint Viviana (Bibiana), a 4th-century martyr whose veneration in Rome is ascertained for the 5th century.

In Arthurian legend, Vivian in its various spellings is one of the names of the Lady of the Lake.

The name was brought to England with the Norman invasion, and is occasionally recorded in England in the 12th and 13th centuries. The masculine given name appears with greater frequency in the early modern period. The spelling Vivian was historically used only as a masculine name, and is still used as such in the UK with this spelling, but in the 19th century was also increasingly given to girls and thus evolved into a unisex name; by the mid 20th century, it has been almost exclusively given as a feminine name in the United States. Use of Vivian as a feminine name peaked in popularity in the United States in 1920 at rank 64, but declined in the second half of the 20th century, falling below rank 500 in the 1980s. Its popularity has again picked up somewhat since the 1990s, as of 2012 having attained rank 140.

Variants of the feminine name include Viviana, Viviane, and Vivienne. The French feminine spelling Vivienne in the United States rose sharply in recent years from below rank 1,000 (no statistical record) to rank 322 in the period 2009–2012. The Italian or Latin form Viviana has enjoyed some popularity since the 1990s, reaching rank 322 in 2000. The spelling Vivien is the French masculine form, but in English speaking countries it has long been used as a feminine form, due to its appearance as the name of the Arthurian Lady of the Lake in Tennyson's Idylls of the King of 1859. For the masculine name, the variant Vyvyan has sometimes been used, based on the Cornish surname itself derived from the given name. The intermediary form Vyvian is also occasionally found.

The Gaelic name Ninian has sometimes been identified as a corruption of Vivian, but it is now considered more likely derived from Welsh Nynniaw, which is itself of uncertain origin, but likely renders Nennius. Bébinn is an unrelated, genuinely Gaelic name which has on occasion been rendered as Vivian in English.

== As a surname ==
The given name Vivian was introduced to Norman England in the 11th or 12th century and over time gave rise to a variety of British surnames, including Videan, Vidgen, Vidgeon, Fiddian, Fidgeon, Phythian, and Phethean.

The Vyvyan family has been a prominent family of Cornwall since the 16th century. The Vyvyan baronetcy was created in the Baronetage of England for Sir Richard Vyvyan in 1645. Baron Vivian was created in the Peerage of the United Kingdom in 1841.

Notable bearers of the surname include:

- C. T. Vivian (1924–2020), American minister and author
- Daniel Vivian (born 1999), Spanish footballer
- Henry Vivian (trade unionist) (1868–1930), English trade unionist and politician
- Herbert Vivian (1865–1940), British journalist and leader of the Neo-Jacobite Revival
- Ivor Vivian (born 1933), Australian politician
- Jennifer Vyvyan (1925–1974), English classical soprano singer
- John Lambrick Vivian (1830–1896), genealogist of Devon and Cornwall
- Joseph Vivien (1657–1735), French painter
- Renée Vivien (1877–1909), British poet in the French language
- Weston E. Vivian (1924–2020), American politician
- William Vyvyan, 14th-century English MP

== Given name ==
=== Masculine given name ===
==== Vivian ====
- Vivian Anderson (born 1956), English football coach and defender
- Vivian Balakrishnan (born 1961), Singaporean politician
- Vivian Bendall (born 1938), English Conservative politician
- Vivian Blake (1956–2010), Jamaican criminal
- Vivian Blake (politician) (1921–2000), Jamaican politician and chief justice of the Bahamas
- Vivian Bose (1891–1983), judge of the Supreme Court of India
- Vivian de Buffrénil (born 1950), French histologist and palaeobiologist
- Vivian Campbell (born 1962), Northern Irish heavy metal guitarist
- Vivian Cook (linguist) (1940–2021), English linguist and professor of Applied Linguistics at Newcastle University
- Vivian Crawford (1879–1922), English first-class cricketer
- Vivian Dsena (born 1988), Indian TV actor
- Vivian Ellis (1904–1996), English musical comedy composer
- Vivian Frederick Maynard FitzSimons (1901–1975), South African herpetologist
- Sir Vivian Fuchs (1908–1999), English explorer to first cross Antarctica overland
- Vivian Hunter Galbraith (1889–1976), English historian and Regius Professor of Modern History at Oxford University|Oxford
- Vivian H. H. Green (1915–2005), rector of Lincoln College, Oxford, and inspiration for John le Carré's character George Smiley
- Vivian Harris (born 1978), Guyanese boxer
- Vivian Wilson Henderson (1923–1976), American educator and human rights activist
- Vivian Imerman (born 1955), South African businessman and former CEO of Del Monte Foods
- Vivian Jackson (1946–2010), Jamaican reggae musician also known as Yabby You
- Clive Vivian Leopold James (Clive James, 1939–2019), Australian author
- Vivian M. Lewis (1869–1950), American politician
- Sir Vivian Naylor-Leyland, 3rd Baronet (1924–1987), British aristocrat and banker
- Viv Prince (1941–2025), English drummer with The Pretty Things
- Sir Viv Richards (born 1952), Antiguan cricketer and sports commentator
- Vivian Roy Stanley Schokman (1887–1953), Sri Lankan Burgher politician and physician
- Major General Vivian Street (1912–1970), British army officer, also known for his charitable work, particularly as chairman of the Save the Children fund
- Vivian Van Damm (1895–1960), English impresario of the Windmill Theatre, London
- Vivian Wilson (disambiguation), several people
- Vivian Wineman (born 1950), commercial lawyer, president of the Board of Deputies of British Jews 2009–2015
- Vivian Woodward (1879–1954), English centre forward footballer

==== Vivien ====
- Vivien Thomas (1910–1985), American surgical technician

==== Vivion ====
- Vivion de Valera (1910–1982), Irish politician, eldest son of Éamon de Valera and Sinéad de Valera

==== Vyvyan ====
- Vyvyan Adams (1900–1951), British Conservative Party politician
- Vyvyan Donnithorne (1886–1968), British Anglican missionary to China
- Vyvyan Evans (born 1968), British professor of Linguistics
- Vyvyan Evelegh (1898–1958), British Army Second World War major-general
- Vyvyan Holland (1886–1967), English author/translator, second son of Oscar Wilde
- Vyvyan Holt (1896–1960), British soldier, diplomat, and Oriental scholar
- Vyvyan Pope (1891–1941), British Army Second World War lieutenant-general

==== Vyvian ====
- Vyvian Pike (born 1969), English cricketer

==== Stage name or nickname ====
- "Vivian", a nickname given to Chaim Herzog in the 1940s
- Vivian Stanshall, stage name of Victor Anthony Stanshall (1943–1995), English comedic musician

=== Feminine given name ===
==== Late antiquity ====
The spelling of these names may differ depending on tradition.

- Saint Vibiana (3rd century)
- Saint Vivian (4th century)

==== Vivian ====
- Vivian Abenshushan (born 1972), Mexican writer and editor
- Vivian Ayers Allen (1923–2025), American poet, playwright, cultural activist, museum curator and classicist
- Vivian Inez Archibald (born 1945), British Virgin Islander politician
- Vivian Bang (born 1983), American actress
- Vivian Barbot (born 1941), Canadian politician
- Vivian Cardoso dos Santos (born 1997), Brazilian footballer
- Vivian Cheruiyot (born 1983), Kenyan long-distance runner
- Vivian Chukwuemeka (born 1975), Nigerian shot putter
- Vivian Conley (1922–1993), American civil rights activist
- Vivian Dandridge (1921–1991), American actress
- Vivian Fine (1913–2000), American composer
- Vivian Flowers (born c. 1969), American politician
- Vivian Garrison (1933–2013), American applied medical anthropologist
- Vivian Glover (born 1947), American writer and television producer
- Vivian Gornick (born 1935), American author
- Vivian Green (born 1979), American R&B singer
- Vivian Holt (1885–1945), American singer
- Vivian Ikechukwu (born 1997), Nigerian footballer
- Vivi Janiss (1911–1988), American actress
- Vivian Annabelle Johnson (1912–1985), American physicist
- Vivian Joseph (born 1948), American figure skater
- Vivian Kong (born 1994), Hong Kong fencer
- Vivian Kubrick (born 1960), American-born English filmmaker and composer
- Vivian Lau (born 1979), Hong Kong boccia player
- Vivian Maier (1926–2009), American photographer
- Vivian Nouri (born 1993), known professionally as Nouri, New Zealand recording artist of Kurdish descent
- Vivian Oparah (born 1996), British actress
- Vivian Polania (1987 or 1988 – 2025), Colombian constitutional lawyer, criminal judge and social media influencer
- Vivian Rubianti (born 1944), Indonesian entrepreneur and the first legally recognized transgender person in the country
- Vivian Schuyler Key (1905–1990), American artist, designer
- Vivian Silver (1949–2023), Canadian-Israeli peace activist
- Vivian Blanche Small (1875–1946), president, Lake Erie College
- Vivian Vance (1909–1979), American actress
- Vivian Weeks (born 2000), American musician
- Vivian Wilson (born 2004), American social media personality and model, eldest living child of Elon Musk and Justine Wilson

==== Vivien ====
- Vivien Bishop (born 1945), New Zealand painter
- Vivien Cardone (born 1993), American actress
- Vivien Duffield (born 1946), British philanthropist
- Vivien Hailstone (1913–2000), Native American designer and educator
- Vivien Kirk, New Zealand mathematician
- Vivien Knight (1953–2009), British art historian and gallerist
- Vivien Leigh, born Vivian Mary Hartley (1913–1967), English Academy Award-winning actress
- Vivien Neves (1947–2002), British glamour model
- Vivien Sansour (born 1978), Palestinian visual artist

==== Viviane ====
- Viv Albertine (born 1954), British guitarist, songwriter and author
- Viviane Araújo (born 1986), Brazilian mixed martial artist
- Viviane Bampassy, Senegalese politician
- Viviane Biviga, Gabonese politician
- Vivi Fernandez (born 1977), Brazilian model
- Viviane Hagner (born 1977), German violinist
- Viviane Loschetter (born 1959), Luxembourgish politician
- Viviane Ndour, Senegalese singer
- Viviane Nicaise (born 1952), Belgian cartoonist and colorist
- Viviane Romance (1912–1991), French actress
- Viviane Sigg (born 1980), German politician
- Viviane Tabar, American neurosurgeon

==== Vivianne ====
- Vivianne Blanlot (born 1956), Chilean economist and politician
- Vivianne Crowley, English author, university lecturer, psychologist, and teacher of the Wiccan religion
- Vivianne Fock Tave, Seychellois diplomat
- Vivianne Miedema (born 1996), Dutch forward footballer
- Vivianne Pasmanter (born 1971), Brazilian actress
- Viviane Ventura, mother of Sheherazade Goldsmith and author

==== Vivienne ====
- Vivienne Anderson, New Zealand professor of education
- Vivienne Boyd (1926–2011), New Zealand politician
- Vivienne Binns (1940–2026), Australian artist
- Vivienne Chandler (1947–2013), French actress and photographer
- Vivienne Faull (born 1955), British Anglican bishop and Lord Spiritual
- Vivienne Goonewardene (1916–1996), Sri Lankan politician
- Vivienne Newton Gray (1917–1988), American educator in Liberia
- Vivienne Haigh-Wood Eliot (1888–1947), first wife of poet and writer T. S. Eliot
- Vivienne Malone-Mayes (1932–1995), American mathematician and professor
- Vivienne Medrano (born 1992), Salvadorian American animator, illustrator, comic creator, and voice actress
- Vivienne Ming, American theoretical neuroscientist and artificial intelligence expert
- Vivienne Osborne (1896–1961), American stage and film actress
- Vivienne (Florence Vivienne Mellish; 1889–1982), British photographer and singer
- Vivienne Roumani (born 1950), Libyan filmmaker
- Vivienne Segal (1897–1992), American actress
- Vivienne de Silva Boralessa (1930–2017), Sri Lankan singer
- Vivienne Spence (born 1965), Jamaican track and field athlete
- Vivienne Trumpy (1917–1975), stage name Vivi Gioi, Italian actress
- Vivienne de Watteville (1900–1957), British travel writer
- Vivienne Westwood (1941–2022), English fashion designer
- Vivienne Wild, British astrophysicist

==== Vyvienne ====
- Vyvienne Long, Irish musician

==== Vyvyan ====
- Vyvyan Lorrayne, South African ballerina

==== Vyvyane ====
- Vyvyane Loh, Chinese Hui-Shien, Malaysian-American novelist, choreographer, and physician

==== As a pseudonym or adopted name ====
- Vivean Gray, British TV and film actress (adopted name of Jean Vivra Gray)
- Vivian Chow (born 1967), Hong Kong singer and actress
- Vivian Hsu (born 1975), Taiwanese singer, actress and model
- The Vivienne (1992–2025), stage name of James Lee Williams, British drag queen
- Vivienne Pinay, Filipino-American drag queen
- Vivienne Poy (born 1941), Canadian politician
- Vivienne Tam (born 1957), Hong Kong fashion designer

== Fictional characters ==
- Vivien, the Lady of the Lake, in Tennyson's Idylls of the King (1859) and elsewhere
- Vivian Alamain, on the American soap opera Days of Our Lives
- Vyvyan "Vyv" Basterd, a punk rock fan and medical student, a main character of the British sitcom The Young Ones
- Vivian Grey, hero of Benjamin Disraeli's eponymous first novel, published in 1826
- Vivian Kudo (Yukiko Kudo), in the manga series Case Closed
- Vivien de Monbranc, hero of a 12th-century French chanson de geste
- Vivienne (Dragon Age), a character from the video game Dragon Age: Inquisition who can be recruited as a party member
- Vivian (Paper Mario), one of the player's partners in the role-playing video game Paper Mario: The Thousand-Year Door
