= Viviana (given name) =

Viviana is a feminine given name.

== Arts ==
- Viviana Andreattini (born 1960), stage name Vivien Vee, Italian singer
- Viviana Di Chiara (born 1992), Italian artist
- Viviana Durante (born 1967), Italian ballet dancer
- Viviana Gibelli (born 1966, Caracas), Venezuelan entertainer
- Viviana Gorbato (1950 – 2005), Argentine journalist, writer, and university professor
- Viviana Mazza (born 1978), Italian journalist
- Viviana Guzmán (born 1964), Chilean entertainer
- Viviana Ortiz (born 1986), Puerto Rican entertainer
- Viviana Ramos, Venezuelan pageant titleholder
- Viviana Rivero (born 1966), Argentine writer
- Viviana Serna (born 1990), Colombian actress
- Viviana Sofronitsky, Canadian pianist
- Viviana Spinosa (born 1984), Colombian artist.

== Politics ==
- Viviana Agundiz (born 1968), Mexican politician
- Viviana Bonilla (born 1983), Ecuadorian lawyer and politician
- Viviana Martín Salazar, Costa Rican politician

== Sports ==
- Viviana Ballabio (born 1967), Italian basketball player
- Viviana Bontacchio (1959–2012), Italian footballer
- Viviana Chávez (born 1987), Argentinean marathon runner
- Viviana Ferrari (born 1992), Uruguayan team handball player
- Viviana González (born 1958), Argentine tennis player
- Viviana Schiavi (born 1982), Italian footballer
- Viviana Velásquez, Colombian cyclist

== Other ==
- Viviana Alder (born 1957), Argentinian researcher
- Viviana Díaz (born 1950), Chilean human rights campaigner
- Viviana Zelizer (born 1946), American sociologist
- Viviana Zocco (born 1962), Argentine businesswoman

== See also ==
- Viviana (disambiguation)
- Vivianna Torun Bülow-Hübe, Swedish silversmith
- Bibiana (disambiguation), a variant of the name
- Vivian (given name), a variant of the name
- Vivien (disambiguation), a variant of the name
- Vivienne, a variant of the name
- Vivianus
