= Bibiana =

Bibiana can refer to:

== Places ==
- Bibiana, Piedmont, Italian commune
- Santa Bibiana, church in Rome

== Name ==
- Bibiana of Rome, fourth-century Italian saint
- Bibiana Aído (b. 1977), Spanish politician
- Bibiana Beglau (b. 1971), German actress
- Bibiana Candelas (b. 1983), Mexican volleyball player
- Bibiana Fernández (b. 1954), Spanish actress
- Bibiana Ferrea (b. 1981), Argentine handball player
- Bibiana Ng (b. 1977), Malaysian shooter
- Bibiana Olama (b. 1982), Equatoguinean athlete
- Bibiana Perez (b. 1970), Italian skier
- Bibiana Rodríguez (b. 1969), Mexican politician
- Bibiana Campos Seijo, Spanish editor, publisher, and media executive
- Bibiana Steinhaus (b. 1979), German football referee

== See also ==
- Bibiana (disambiguation)
- Bibiane
- Vivian (given name)
- Viviana (disambiguation)
- Bibianna, Greater Poland Voivodeship, Polish village
