= Saint Vivian =

Saint Vivian may refer to:

- Saint Vimin (died 579), Scottish abbot and bishop
- Bibiana of Rome (died c. 360), Roman virgin and martyr

== See also ==
- Saint Vivianus
- Saint-Vivien (disambiguation)
