= Demetria of Rome =

4th century Catholic saint

Saint Demetria
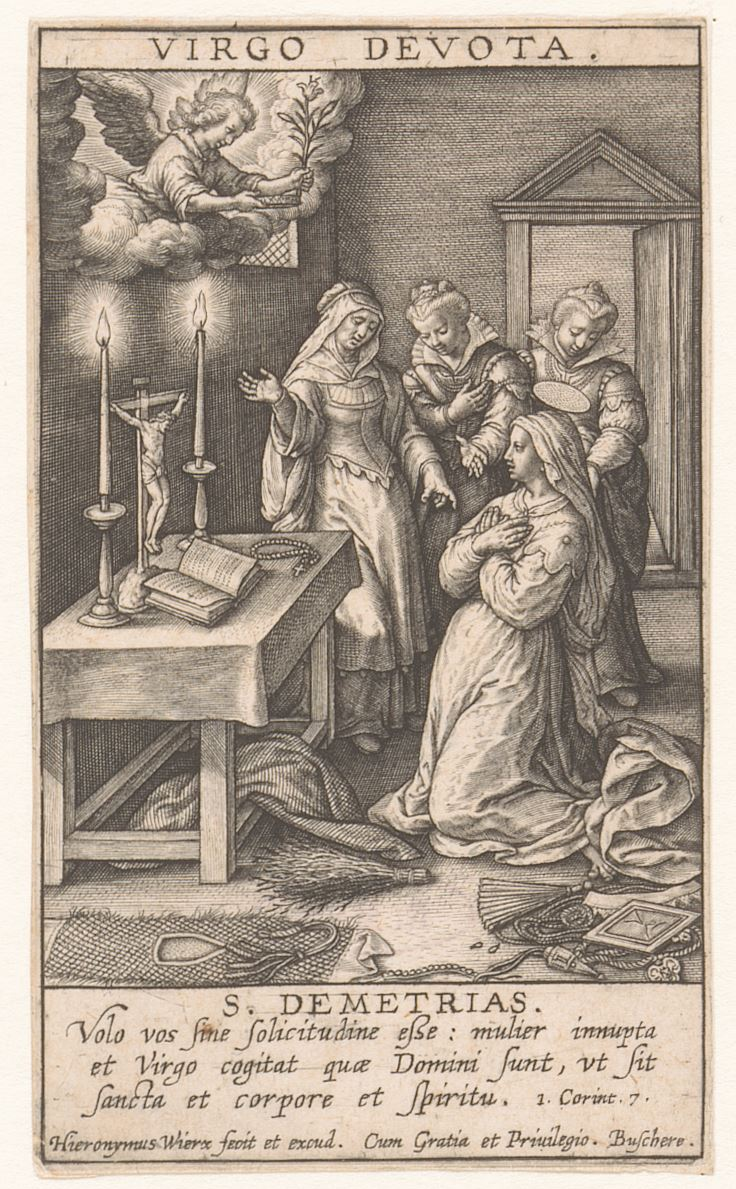
- Image of Saint Demetria with a caption from 1 Cor: "I want you to be without anxiety: the unmarried woman and the virgin are anxious about the affairs of the Lord, so that they may be holy in body and spirit."

Virgin martyr
- Died: 362; Rome
- Venerated in: Roman Catholic Church
- Canonized: pre-congregation
- Feast: 21 June

Demetria of Rome (d. 362) was an early Christian virgin, martyr, and is venerated as a saint. She is mentioned in the Roman Martyrology on 21 June.

== Life ==
Demetria's parents were Flavianus and Dafrosa, and her sister was Bibiana, who all became saints; the entire family was martyred under the Roman emperor Julian, during his anti-Christian campaign after he came to power in 361. After Dafosa was killed, Demetria and Bibiana were put under house arrest; as historian Agnes Dunbar put it, "attempts were made to pervert them from the faith". According to hagiographer Alban Butler, the sisters, who spent their arrest in prayer and fasting, "were stripped of all they had in the world and suffered much from poverty" after the death of their parents. They were brought before the Roman prefect Apronianus, the same ruler who had condemned their parents, and were ordered to be executed. After she confessed her faith in Christ, Demetria fell down dead before the tribunal, in the presence of the judge, apparently from shock.

== Veneration ==
Demetria's relics, along with those of her mother and sister, are preserved inside an alabaster urn beneath the high altar of the little basilica of Santa Bibiana in Rome. Her feast day is 21 June.

== Works cited ==
- Craughwell, Thomas J. (2011). Saints Preserved: An Encyclopedia of Relics (1st ed.). New York: Image Books. ISBN 978-0-307-59073-2. OCLC 676726893.
