= Angoulins =

- Commune
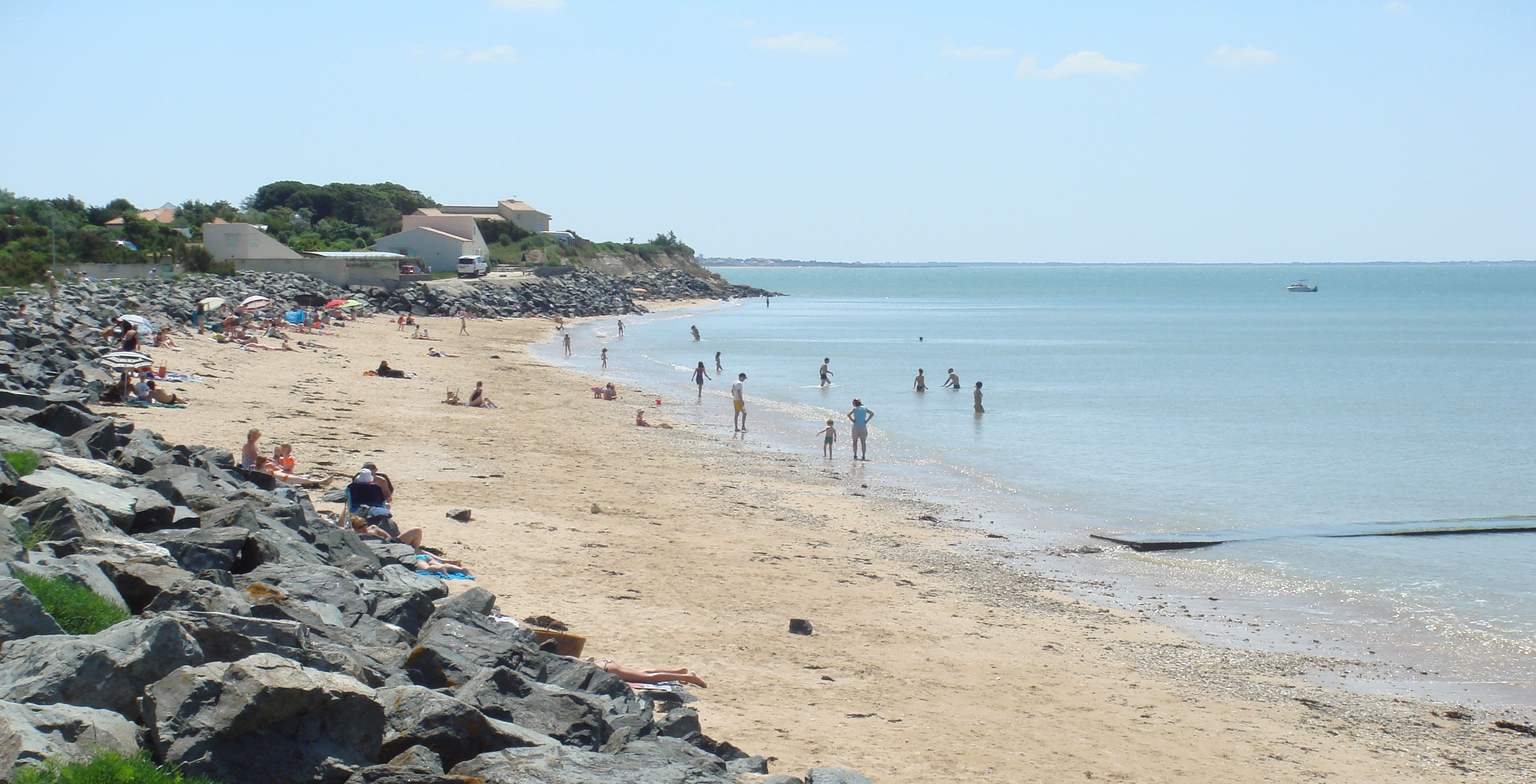
- Seashore at Angoulins

- Coat of arms
- Location of Angoulins
- Location within France Location within Nouvelle-Aquitaine
- Coordinates: 46°06′18″N 1°06′31″W
- Country: France
- Region: Nouvelle-Aquitaine
- Department: Charente-Maritime
- Arrondissement: La Rochelle
- Canton: Châtelaillon-Plage
- Intercommunality: La Rochelle

Government
  - Mayor (2020–2026): Jean-Pierre Nivet
- Area^{1}: 7.86 km^{2} (3.03 sq mi)
- Elevation: 4 m (13 ft)
- Highest elevation: 17 m (56 ft)
- Lowest elevation: 0 m (0 ft)
- Population (2023): 4,240
  - Density: 539/km^{2} (1,400/sq mi)
- Time zone: UTC+01:00 (CET)
  - Summer (DST): UTC+02:00 (CEST)
- INSEE/Postal code: 17010 /17690
- ^{1} French Land Register data, which excludes lakes, ponds, glaciers > 1 km^{2} (0.386 sq mi or 247 acres) and river estuaries.

Angoulins (French pronunciation: [ɑ̃ɡulɛ̃]) is a commune in the Charente-Maritime department in the Nouvelle-Aquitaine region of southwestern France.

== Geography ==
Angoulins is located in the northwest of the department of Charente-Maritime some 8 km south-east of La Rochelle and 5 km north of Châtelaillon-Plage in the former province of Aunis. It is a coastal commune on the Atlantic Ocean. Access is by the E602 (D137) highway from La Rochelle continuing south-east with an exit in the commune just east of Angoulins town. There is also the D202 from Salles-sur-Mer in the east turning south and continuing to Chatelaillon-Plage. Access to the town is by the D111E1 from the D202 on the southern border continuing through the town and turning east to the motorway exit.

Angoulins town has a large urban area occupying almost 50% of the commune, with farmland to the north, east, and west.

=== Geology ===
The entire commune is located on Jurassic terrain, which completely covers the plain of Aunis. Jurassic Marl and limestone outcrops appear on the surface of the commune, and the relief is slightly rolling.

The coastal strip of Angoulins, which corresponds to the last extremity of the plain of Aunis, is relatively varied. It alternates between low sandy and marshy shores and high limestone cliffs.

Low-lying coasts, which were formerly salt marshes, have today been transformed into oyster beds (at the marsh north of Chay Point) and are derived from Quaternary sedimentary deposits of marine origin - from the last Flandrian transgression. The sandy coast is situated in a small cove formed naturally by the phenomena of marine erosion and ocean currents (Angoulins beach, south of the Chay point).

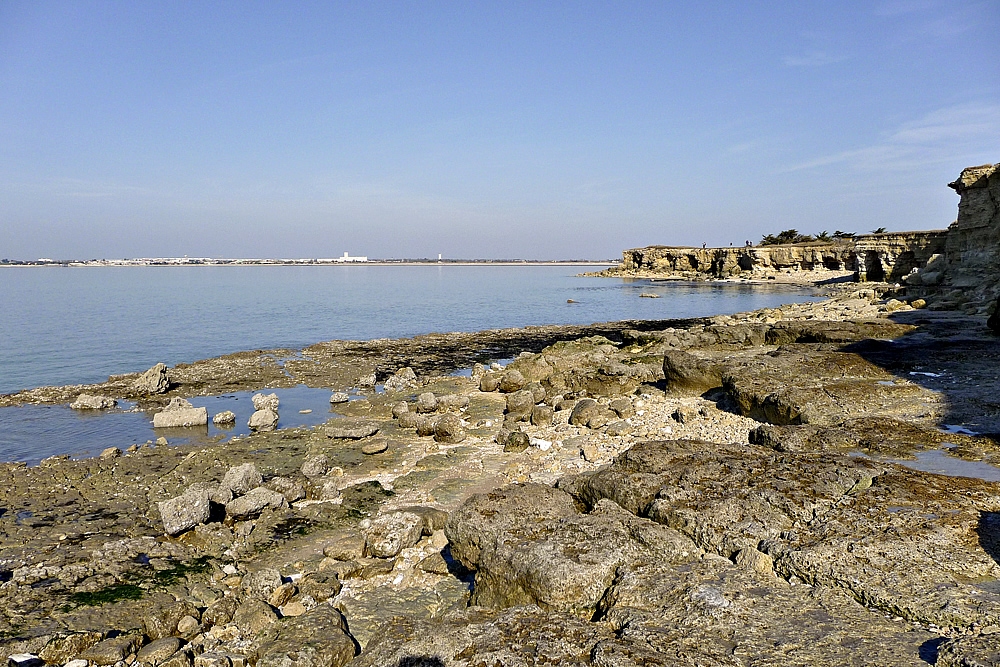
Chay Point at Angoulins-sur-Mer, a popular place for geologists

The coastal cliffs are located all around the Chay Point and form a limestone peninsula - a sharp promontory jutting into the ocean. Layers of alternating beds of oolitic marl and limestone can be seen on the cliffs that line the coast from La Rochelle to Angoulins-sur-Mer. They are highlighted by thick layers of white rocks alternating with layers of very friable sand and mud, formed during glacial periods, also with layers containing various corals from tropical periods. Chay Point, about five kilometres south of La Rochelle, contains many fossils of marine animals and is an especially famous place of palaeontological studies.

The limestone thus formed is widely used as a building material in traditional houses in the region.

=== Transport ===
==== Railway stations and halts ====
- Aytré (halt) 3 km
- Châtelaillon-Plage 3.1 km
- La Rochelle (TGV) 6.1 km
- Rochefort 20.7 km

==== Airports and aerodromes ====
- La Rochelle (Laleu) 10.8 km
- Rochefort-St-Agnant 26 km
- Aerodrome of Royan-Médis 54 km

=== Heraldry ===
Arms of Angoulins	Blazon: Azure, a carrack of Or, sailed in Argent, top castle the same, in chief Gules charged with three mullets of Or.

== Administration ==
List of successive mayors

From	To	Name	Party
1965	1983	Albert Denis	PCF
1983	1989	Robert Cassagnes	
1989	2001	Claude Grenier	SE
2001	2014	Marie-Claude Bridonneau	PRG
2014	2020	Daniel Vailleau	PS
2020	2026	Jean-Pierre Nivet	PS

== Population ==
The inhabitants of the commune are known as Angoulinois or Angoulinoises in French.

Historical population
Year	Pop.	±% p.a.
1968	2,126	—
1975	2,149	+0.15%
1982	2,441	+1.84%
1990	2,908	+2.21%
1999	3,501	+2.08%
2007	3,695	+0.68%
2012	3,791	+0.51%
2017	3,940	+0.77%
2023	4,240	+1.23%
Source: INSEE

== Economy ==
There are 12 enterprises in industry, 24 in construction, 83 shops, 37 service enterprises, two farms, and one shellfish farm. Angoulins is best known for its shopping area.

== Sites and monuments ==
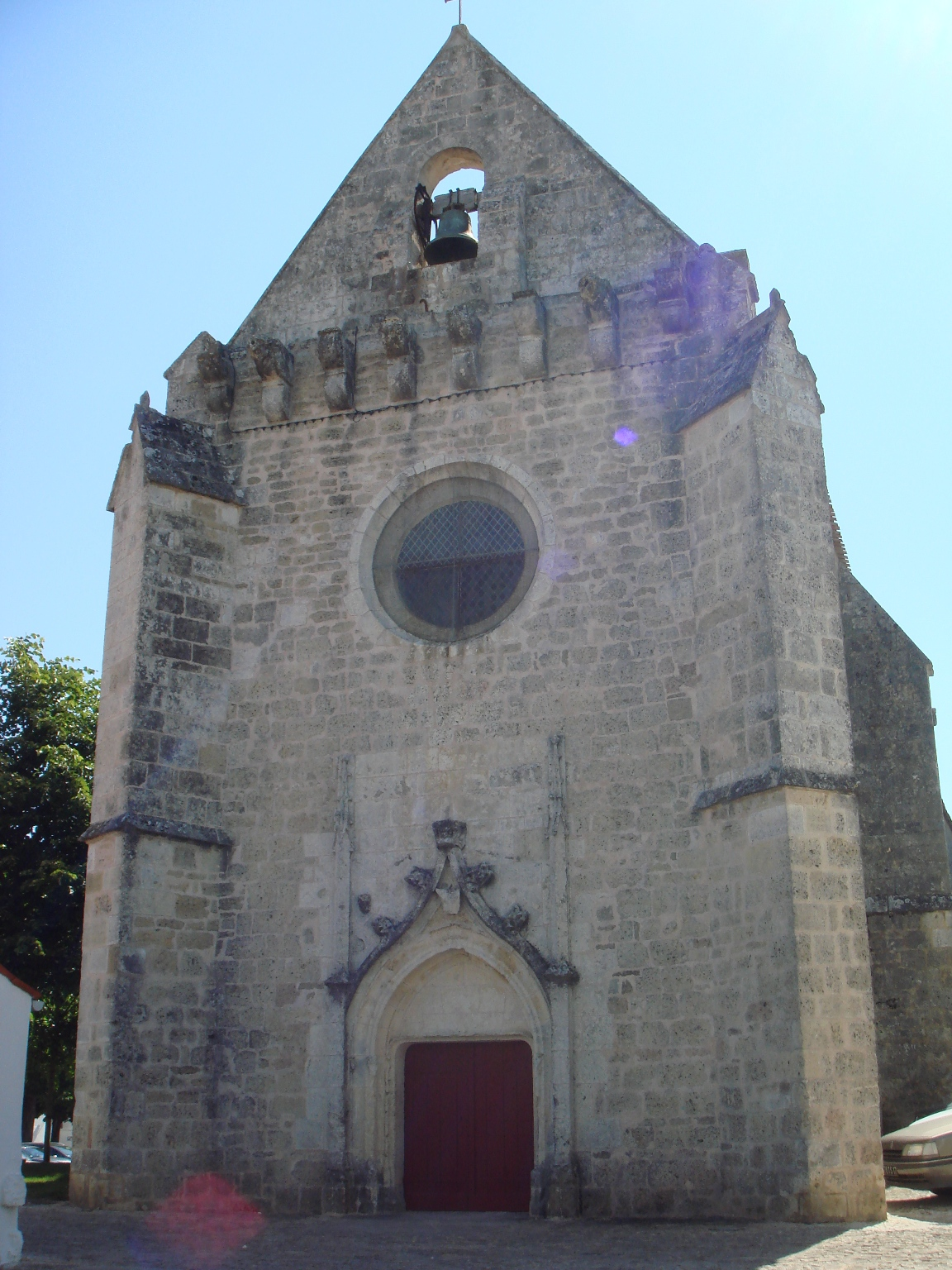
The Church of Saint-Peter

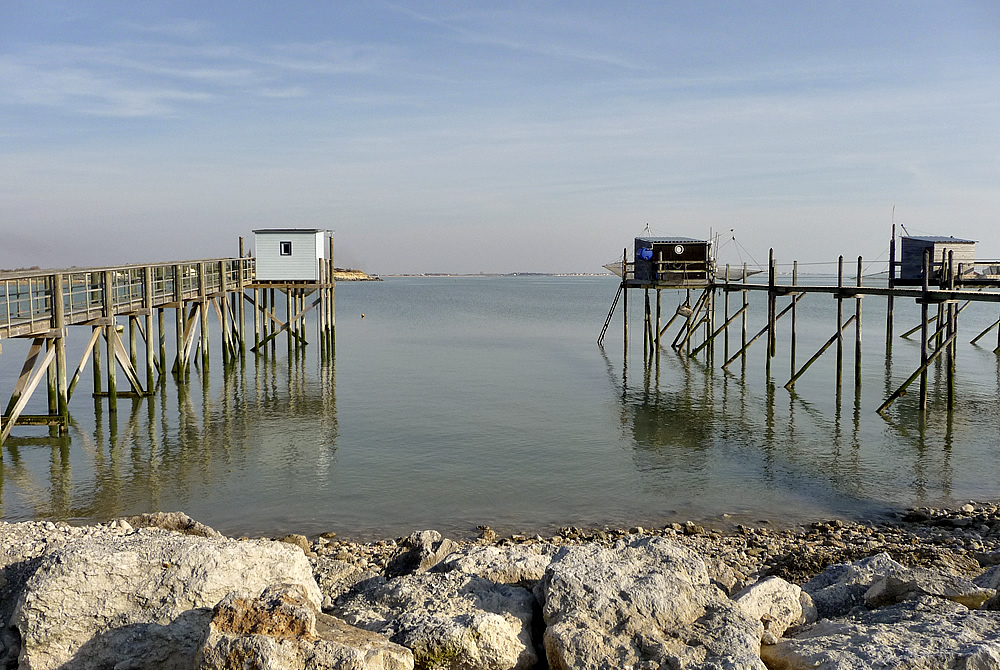
Fishing Houses

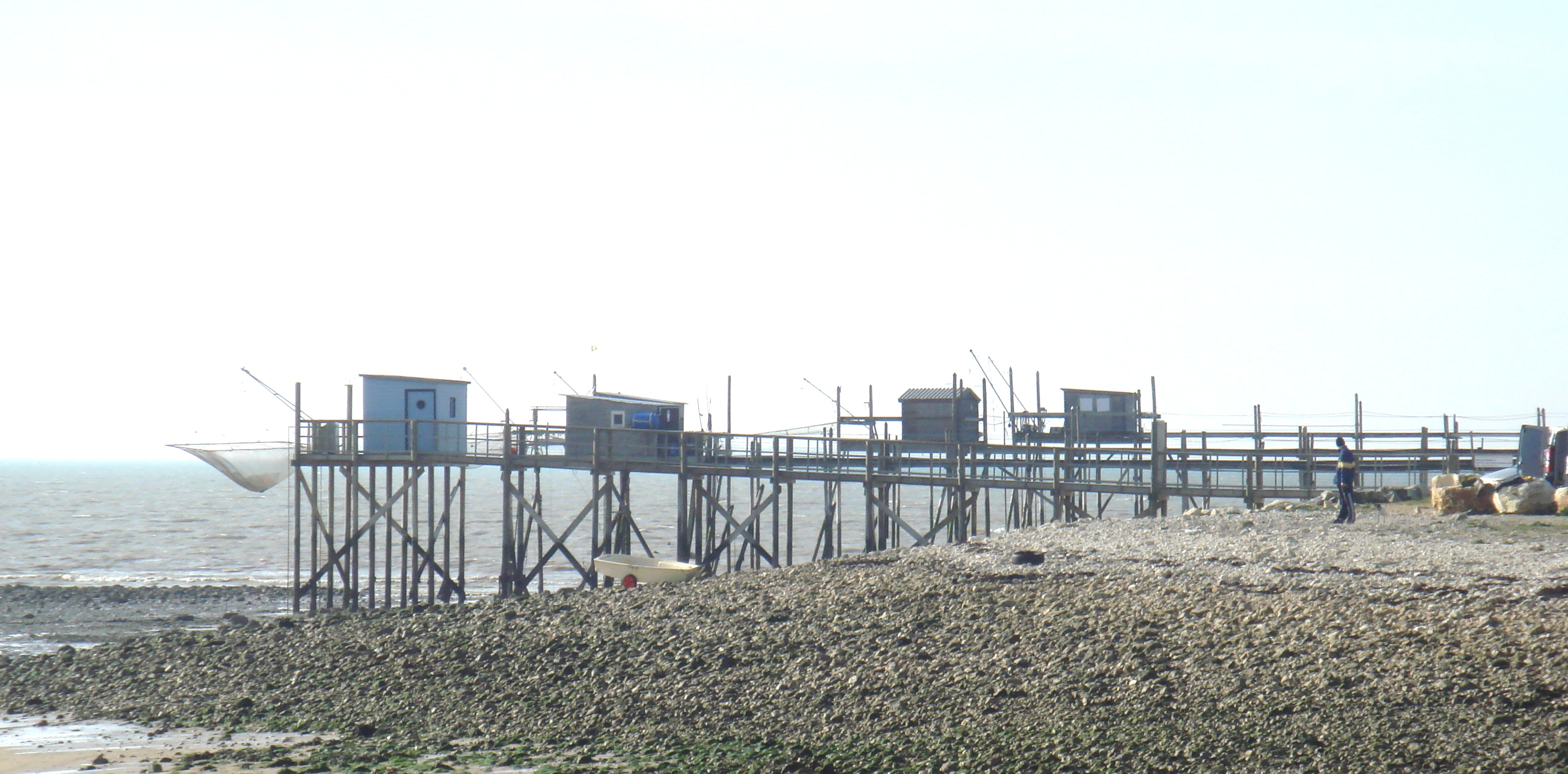
Fishing houses

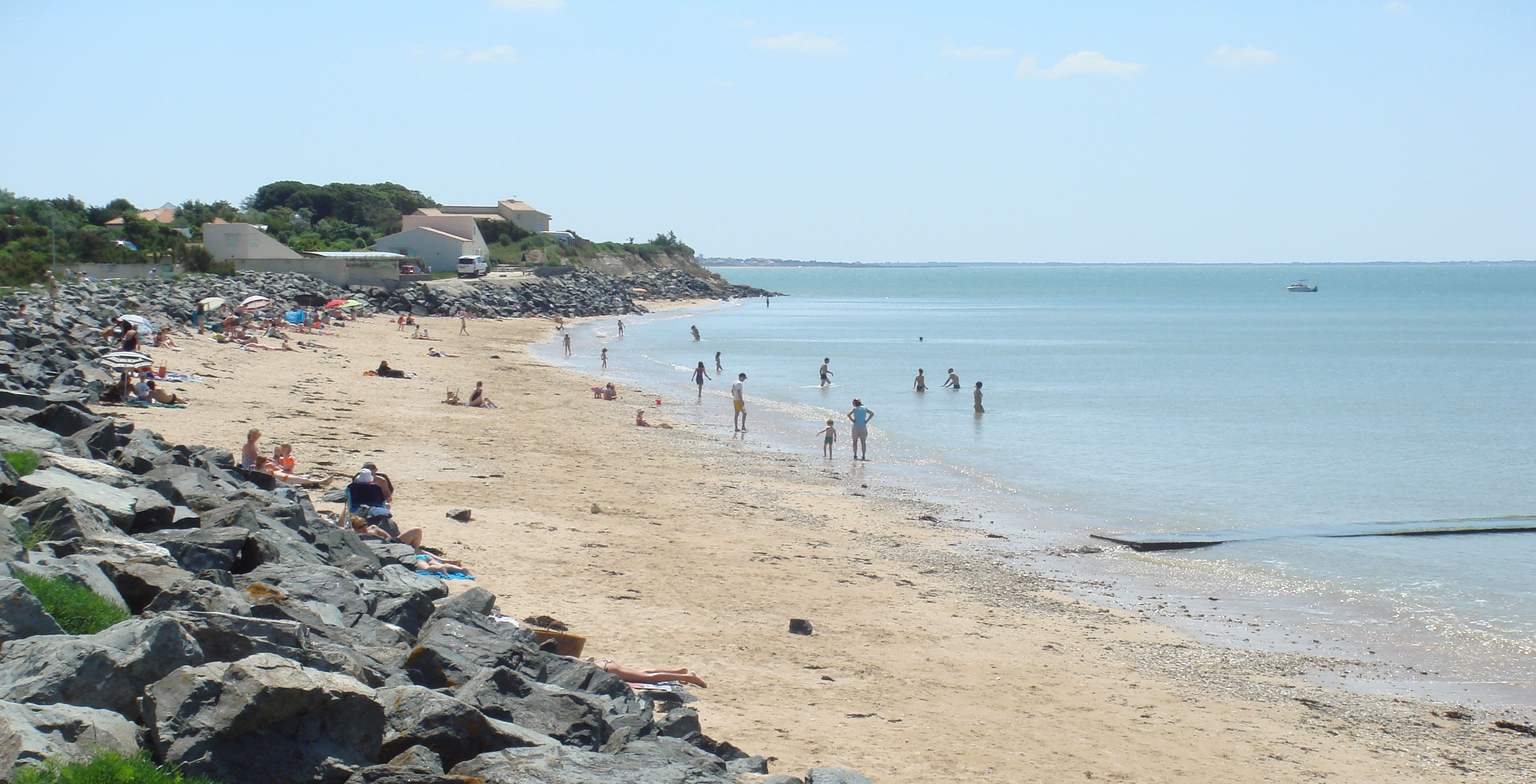
Angoulins Beach

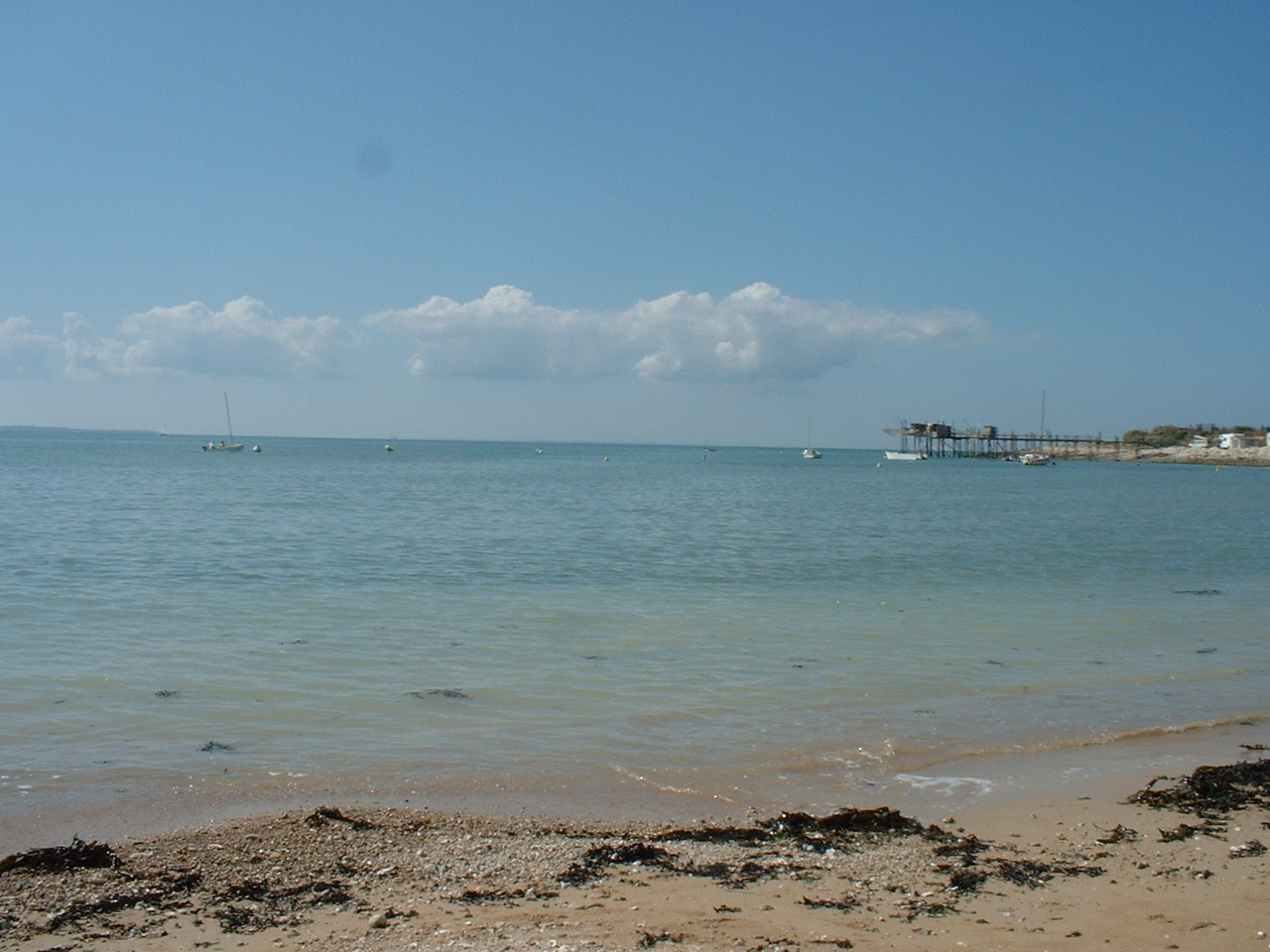
Angoulins Beach

The Church of Saint-Peter (15th century) is registered as an historical monument. There remains the Machicolations on the walkway that connects the three Bartizans located in the north-east corner and the two corners of the apse. The west façade forms a bell tower wall in a fortified triangle. The Chevet preserves the structure of the walkway between the two Bartizans. The nave is Gothic with arched ribs. The church contains two items that are registered as historical objects:

- A pulpit (1758)
- A bronze bell (1631)

== Notable people linked to the commune ==
- Colette Besson, gold medalist in the 400m at the 1968 Summer Olympics in Mexico, died in Angoulins and was buried in the cemetery.
- Father Daniel Brottier, founder of the Foundation of Auteuil, came regularly to spend his summer holidays.

== Local associations ==
- Angoul'Loisirs: Association of Youth and Popular Education founded under the 1901 Act in 1992 which includes different sectors: a day nursery, a leisure centre, a Youth Projects area, and a Family area.
- Centre Nautique d'Angoulins: An association under the 1901 Act founded in 1976. Originally comprising a handful of enthusiasts and a wooden hut, the association now has more than a hundred members and hosted nearly 2,000 people over the year (windsurfing, catamaran, optimists, etc.). An artificial body of water was added to the site in 1990. On the night of 27 to 28 February 2010, the Centre Nautique d'Angoulins was badly affected by the storm Xynthia. The buildings were flooded to an average height of 1.60 m. The club's pontoon for teaching fishing, available to rent, was completely destroyed by the storm; it is currently under reconstruction.

== See also ==
- Communes of the Charente-Maritime department
