= Saint Bibiana (Bernini) =

Sculpture by Gian Lorenzo Bernini

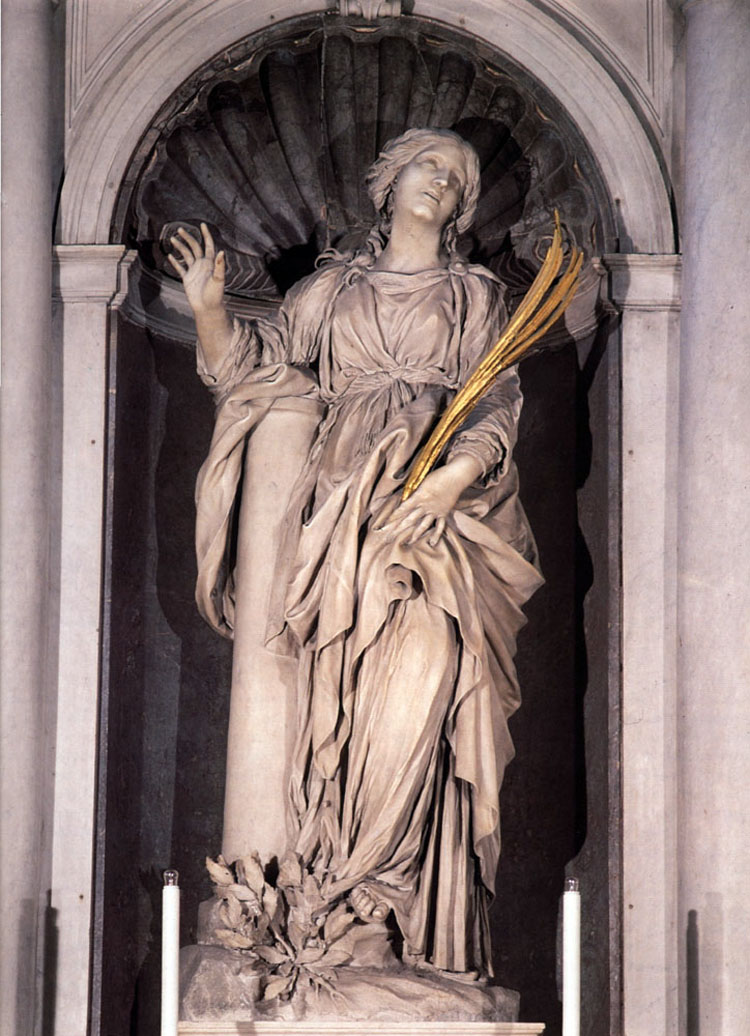
- Artist: Gian Lorenzo Bernini
- Year: 1624–26
- Catalogue: 20
- Type: Sculpture
- Medium: Marble
- Subject: Saint Bibiana
- Location: Santa Bibiana, Rome

Saint Bibiana is a sculpture by the Italian artist Gian Lorenzo Bernini. It sits in the high altar of the church of Santa Bibiana in Rome. Bernini received his first payment for the work in 1624, and his final payment in 1626. A seventeenth-century print of the statue exists in the Teylers Museum, Harlem, the Netherlands.

== History ==
Statue of Saint Bibiana is the first example of this Christian Baroque type. It was commissioned in 1624 by rediscovering of saint's body at the beginning of the pontificate of Urban VIII, who that event considered as a good sign of the beginning of his papacy. Therefore, he initiated rebuilding of the original church in the new Baroque style, also with creating of interior and new high altar of Saint Bibiana. Execution of the works and sculpture was commissioned to Gian Lorenzo Bernini.

== Contemporary damage ==
The sculpture was shown as part of the large Bernini retrospective at the Galleria Borghese in Rome (2017-18) On its return to the church of Santa Bibiana, the ring finger of the saint's right hand was broken off.

== See also ==
- List of works by Gian Lorenzo Bernini
