= Charles Vivian =

Charles Vivian may refer to:

- Charles Vivian, 2nd Baron Vivian (1808–1886), British peer and Whig politician
- E. C. Vivian (1882–1947), British editor and writer
- John Charles Vivian (1887–1964), American attorney, journalist and politician
- Charles Vivian, founder of the Benevolent and Protective Order of Elks

== See also ==
- Vivian Charles, a character in Pushing Daisies
- Vivian (disambiguation)
