= Viviana =

Viviana is a female given name, and may refer to:

- Viviana (film), a 1916 American film
- Viviana (telenovela), a 1978 Mexican telenovela
- Saint Bibiana, or Viviana, 4th-century Roman martyr
- Viviana (given name)

== See also ==
- Bibiana (disambiguation), a variant of the name
- Vivian (given name), a variant of the name
- Vivien (disambiguation), a variant of the name
- Vivienne, a variant of the name
- Saint Vibiana, 3rd-century Roman martyr
- Acraea viviana, butterfly
- Lake Shore Mall (Thane) (previously known as Viviana Mall), a shopping mall in Thane, India
