= Vivan =

Vivan or Vivaan may refer to:

== People with the surname ==
- Gianluca Vivan (born 1983), Italian footballer

== People with the given name ==
- Vivan Bhatena (born 1978), Indian model and actor
- Vivaan Shah, Indian actor in the Hindi film industry
- Vivan Sundaram (1943–2023), Indian artist

== Fictional characters ==
- Vivaan Varma, character played by Kunal Kapoor in the 2007 Bollywood film Laaga Chunari Mein Daag

== See also ==
- Vivian (disambiguation)
