= Vivian Township =

Vivian Township may refer to:

== Canada ==
- Vivian Township, Thunder Bay District, Ontario

== United States ==
- Vivian Township, Waseca County, Minnesota
- Vivian Township, Sargent County, North Dakota, a township in North Dakota
- Vivian Township, Lyman County, South Dakota, a township in South Dakota

== See also ==
- Vivian (disambiguation)
