= Vivien =

Vivien may refer to:

- Vivien (name), variant spelling
- Vivien, Western Australia, an abandoned town in Australia
- HMS Vivien (L33), a British destroyer launched in 1918 and sold in 1947 for scrapping

== See also ==
- Saint-Vivien (disambiguation)
- Vivienne
- Vivian (disambiguation)
- Viviana (disambiguation)
