= Vivian =

Vivian may refer to:

- Vivian (name), a given name and also a surname

== Places ==
- Vivian, Louisiana, U.S.
- Vivian, South Dakota, U.S.
- Vivian, West Virginia, U.S.
- Vivian Island, Nunavut, Canada
- Ballantrae, Ontario, a hamlet in Stouffville, Ontario, formerly known as Vivian

== Other ==
- Vivian (album), an album by Vivian Green
- Vivian (Paper Mario), a Paper Mario character
- Vivian & Sons, a British metallurgical and chemicals business based at Hafod, in the lower Swansea valley
- MV Vivian, an Empire F type coaster originally named Empire Farjeon, in service in Greece from 1966-87

== See also ==
- Saint-Vivien (disambiguation)
- Vivien (disambiguation)
- Viviana (disambiguation)
- Vivianite, a mineral
