= Vivian Wilson (disambiguation) =

Vivian Wilson (born 2004) is an American social media personality and the daughter of Elon and Justine Musk.

Vivian Wilson may also refer to:

- Vivian Wilson (rugby union) (1899–1978), New Zealand rugby union player
- Vivian Wilson Fernandes (born 1990), Indian rapper and songwriter
- Vivian Wilson Henderson (1923–1976), American educator and human rights activist
- Joseph Vivian Wilson (1894–1977), New Zealand public servant and diplomat
- Vivian Wilson, founder of Chipangali Wildlife Orphanage
