= Yves, Charente-Maritime =

Yves
- Commune
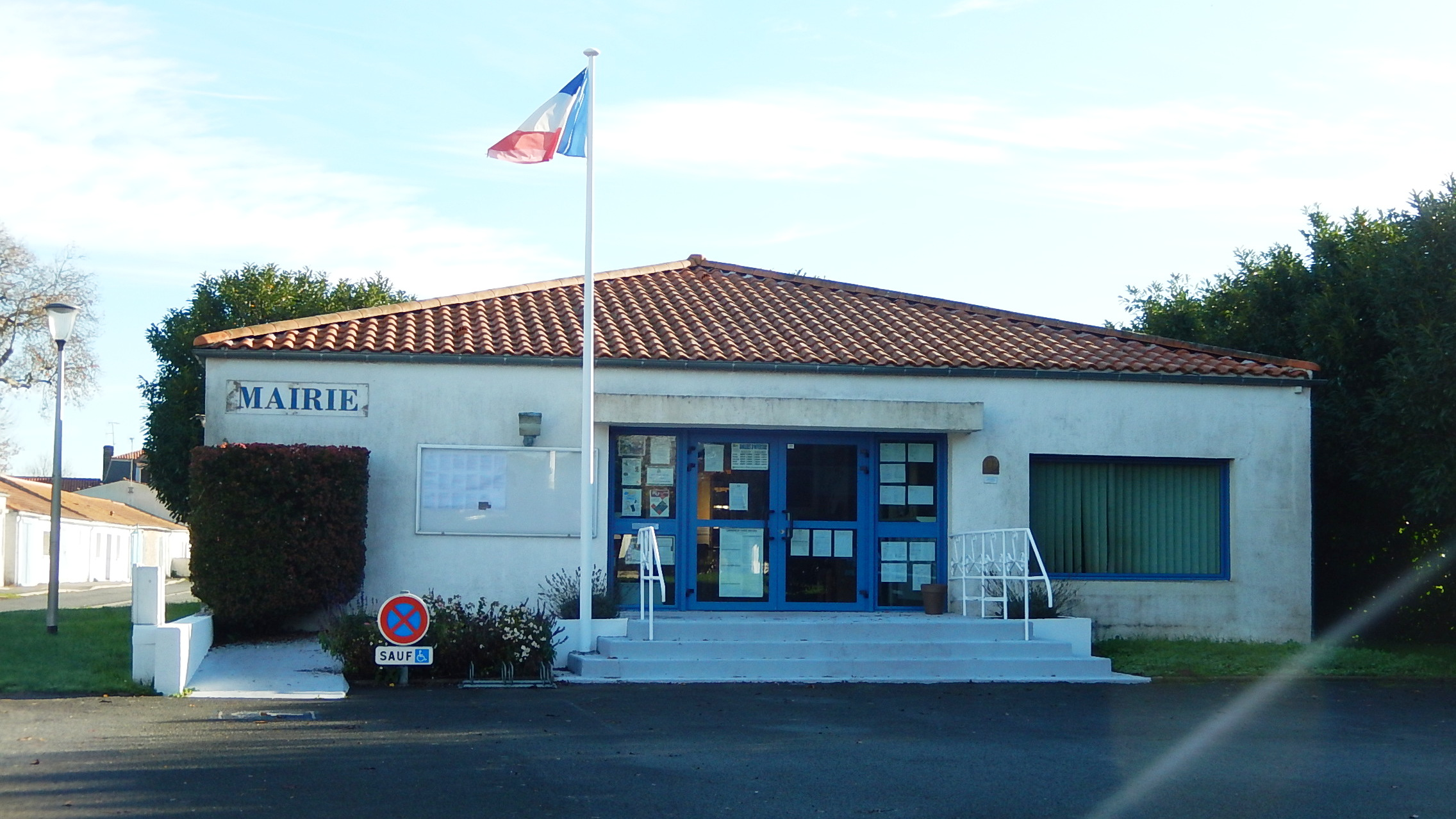
- Town hall
- Location of Yves
- Location within France Location within Nouvelle-Aquitaine
- Coordinates: 46°02′27″N 1°02′38″W
- Country: France
- Region: Nouvelle-Aquitaine
- Department: Charente-Maritime
- Arrondissement: La Rochelle
- Canton: Châtelaillon-Plage
- Intercommunality: La Rochelle

Government
  - Mayor (2020–2026): Didier Roblin
- Area^{1}: 25.75 km^{2} (9.94 sq mi)
- Elevation: 9 m (30 ft)
- Highest elevation: 18 m (59 ft)
- Lowest elevation: 0 m (0 ft)
- Population (2023): 1,585
  - Density: 61.55/km^{2} (159.4/sq mi)
- Time zone: UTC+01:00 (CET)
  - Summer (DST): UTC+02:00 (CEST)
- INSEE/Postal code: 17483 /17340
- ^{1} French Land Register data, which excludes lakes, ponds, glaciers > 1 km^{2} (0.386 sq mi or 247 acres) and river estuaries.

Yves (French pronunciation: [iv]) is a commune in the Charente-Maritime department, Nouvelle-Aquitaine, southwestern France.

Places and hamlets include:

- Le Marouillet
- Les Trois Canons
- Voutron

== Population ==
Historical population
Year	Pop.	±% p.a.
1968	504	—
1975	531	+0.75%
1982	807	+6.16%
1990	893	+1.27%
1999	1,057	+1.89%
2007	1,397	+3.55%
2012	1,455	+0.82%
2017	1,477	+0.30%
2023	1,585	+1.18%
Source: INSEE

== See also ==
- Communes of the Charente-Maritime department
