= Saint-Vivien =

Saint-Vivien may refer to the following places in France:

- Saint-Vivien, Charente-Maritime, a commune in the Charente-Maritime département
- Saint-Vivien, La Garde, a former commune in the Charente-Maritime département that is now a part of Montlieu-la-Garde
- Saint-Vivien, Dordogne, a commune in the Dordogne département
- Saint-Vivien, Paussac, a former commune in the Dordogne département that is now a part of Paussac-et-Saint-Vivien
- Saint-Vivien-de-Blaye, in the Gironde département
- Saint-Vivien-de-Médoc, in the Gironde département
- Saint-Vivien-de-Monségur, in the Gironde département

== See also ==
- Saint Vivianus (died c. 490)
- Saint Vivian (disambiguation)
