= Lillian Rosedale Goodman =

American singer, composer (1887–1972)

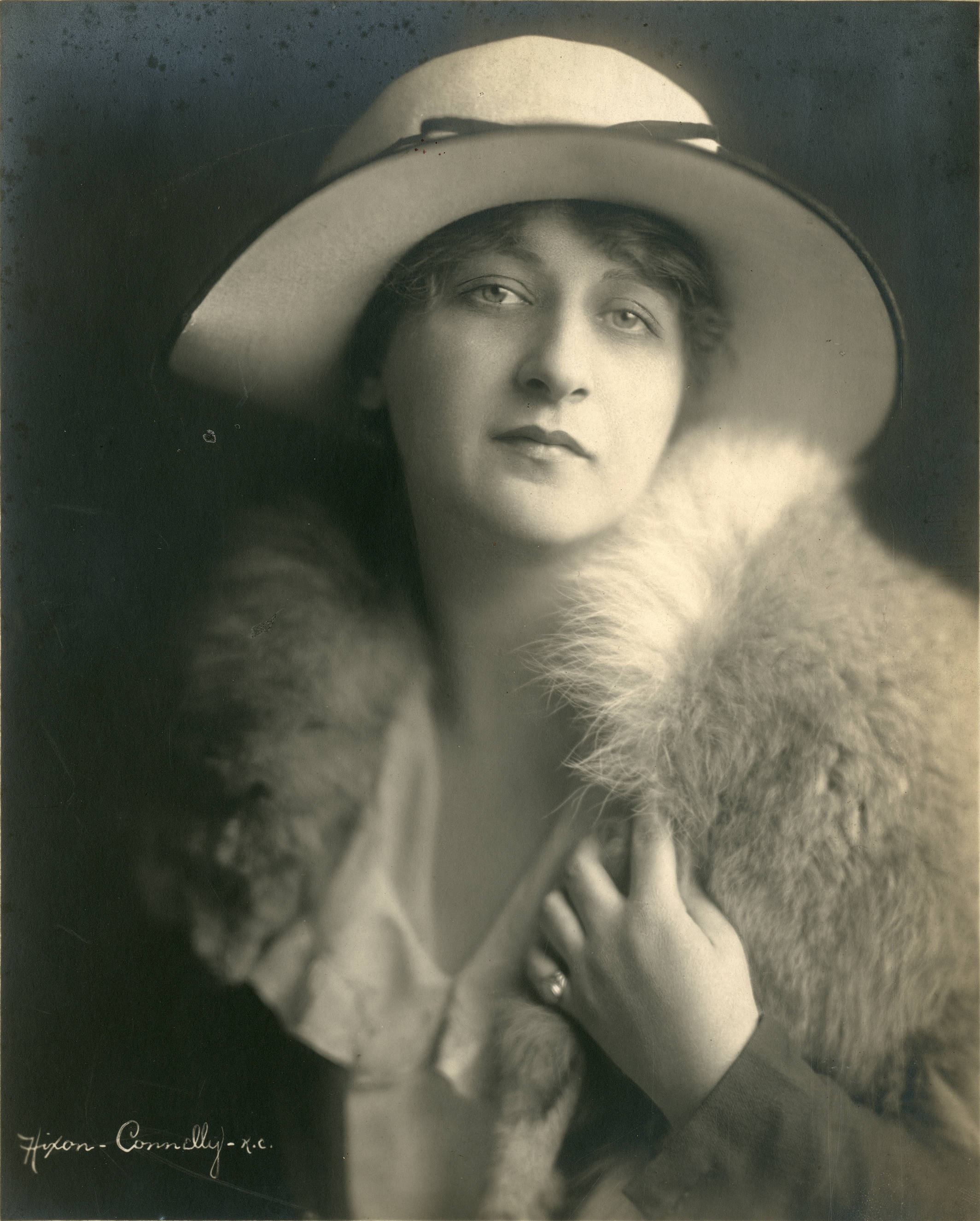
- Lillian Rosedale in 1921.
- Born: Lillian Rosenthal; May 30, 1887
- Died: January 23, 1972 (aged 84); Los Angeles, California, U.S.
- Occupations: Singer, pianist, songwriter, composer

Lillian Rosedale Goodman (May 30, 1887 – January 23, 1972), born Lillian Rosenthal, was an American singer, pianist, vocal teacher, composer, and songwriter.

== Early life ==
Lillian Rosenthal was the daughter of Emma and Elias Rosenthal. Her father was a Russian-born attorney in New York. She studied music at the Damrosch School of Musical Art.

== Career ==
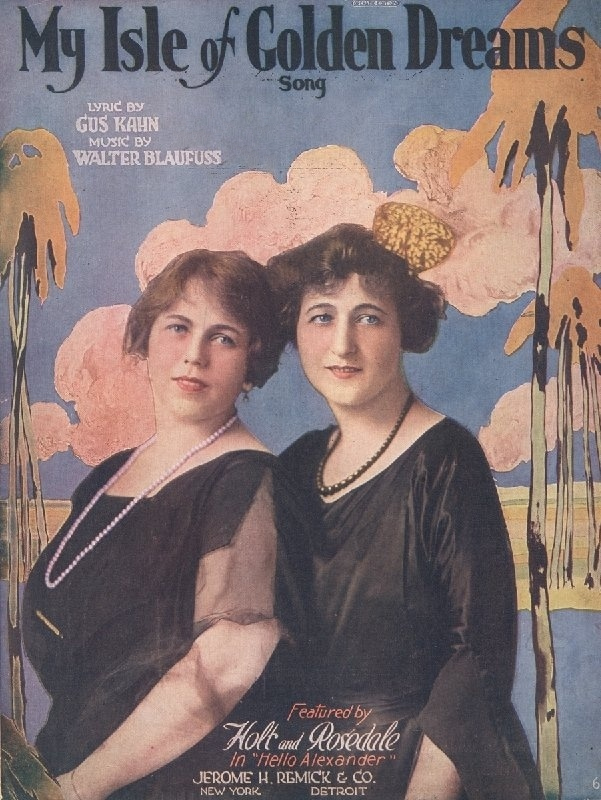
Holt and Rosedale on the cover of sheet music in 1919

Rosedale appeared on Broadway in four shows: Hello, Alexander (1919), The Midnight Rounders of 1920 (1920), The Century Revue (1920), and Red Pepper (1922). A contralto or mezzo-soprano singer, she recorded more than a dozen duets with Vivian Holt in 1919, for Victor. She accompanied Holt as a pianist in two other recordings. She and Holt performed "a refined act of musical worth" in vaudeville in the 1910s, and sang together on radio in the 1930s.

Songs written or composed by Rosedale included "Chérie, I Love You", "If I Could Look Into Your Eyes", "Whisper to Me", "Just a Bit of Dreaming", "The Sun Goes Down", "You Have My Heart", "My Shepherd is the Lord", "Let There Be Peace", "I Found You", "Ecstasy", and "Our Prayer".

"Chérie, I Love You", her best-known song, was recorded by many popular singers, including Nat King Cole, Pat Boone, Annette Hanshaw, Grace Moore, and Frankie Laine. Phrases from the song were heard in Warner Brothers cartoons, often sung by Mel Blanc as the skunk character, Pepé Le Pew.

Goodman was a member of the California Music Teachers Association and ASCAP. Later in life, she taught voice students, and did voice coaching for well-known singers and actors such as José Ferrer and Betty Hutton. She made a record of vocal exercises, I Say You Can Sing (1962).

== Personal life ==
As a young woman, Lillian Rosenthal was in a relationship with author Theodore Dreiser for about ten years. She married attorney Mark O. Goodman in 1921. They had a son, Morton Goodman, with whom she sometimes performed and wrote songs. She died in 1972, aged 84 years, in Los Angeles.
