= Vivianus =

Vivianus is a masculine given name which may refer to:

- Vivianus (jurist), second century Roman jurist
- Flavius Antoninus Messala Vivianus, a Roman politician and consul in 463
- Saint Vivianus (died c. 490), French saint and first known bishop of Saintes
