= Canton of Châtelaillon-Plage =

Coordinates: 46.08°N 1.09°W

The canton of Châtelaillon-Plage (French: canton de Châtelaillon-Plage) is an administrative division of the Charente-Maritime department, western France. It was created at the French canton reorganisation which came into effect in March 2015. Its seat is in Châtelaillon-Plage.

It consists of the following communes:

1. Angoulins
2. Châtelaillon-Plage
3. Fouras
4. Île-d'Aix
5. Saint-Laurent-de-la-Prée
6. Saint-Vivien
7. Salles-sur-Mer
8. Yves
