= Bibiana Campos Seijo =

Editor of Chemical & Engineering News

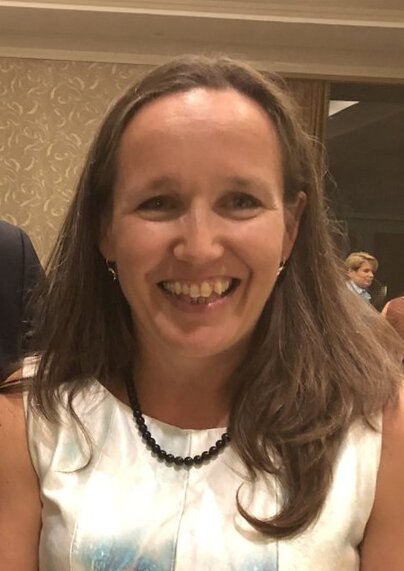
- Other name: Bibi
- Education: Universidad de Santiago de Compostela; Manchester Metropolitan University
- Spouse: Johnathan "Joff" Pincher (married 2010)
- Children: 2
- Website: https://www.acs.org/content/acs/en/acs-webinars/presenters/bibiana-campos-seijo.html

Bibiana Campos Seijo is an editor, publisher, and media executive and was employed as the Editor-in-Chief of Chemical & Engineering News until 2022. She was also vice president of the C&EN Media Group. C&EN is published by the American Chemical Society, the world's largest scientific society by membership. Since late 2024, she has served as senior editor and content director of Optics & Photonics News, published by the scientific society Optica.

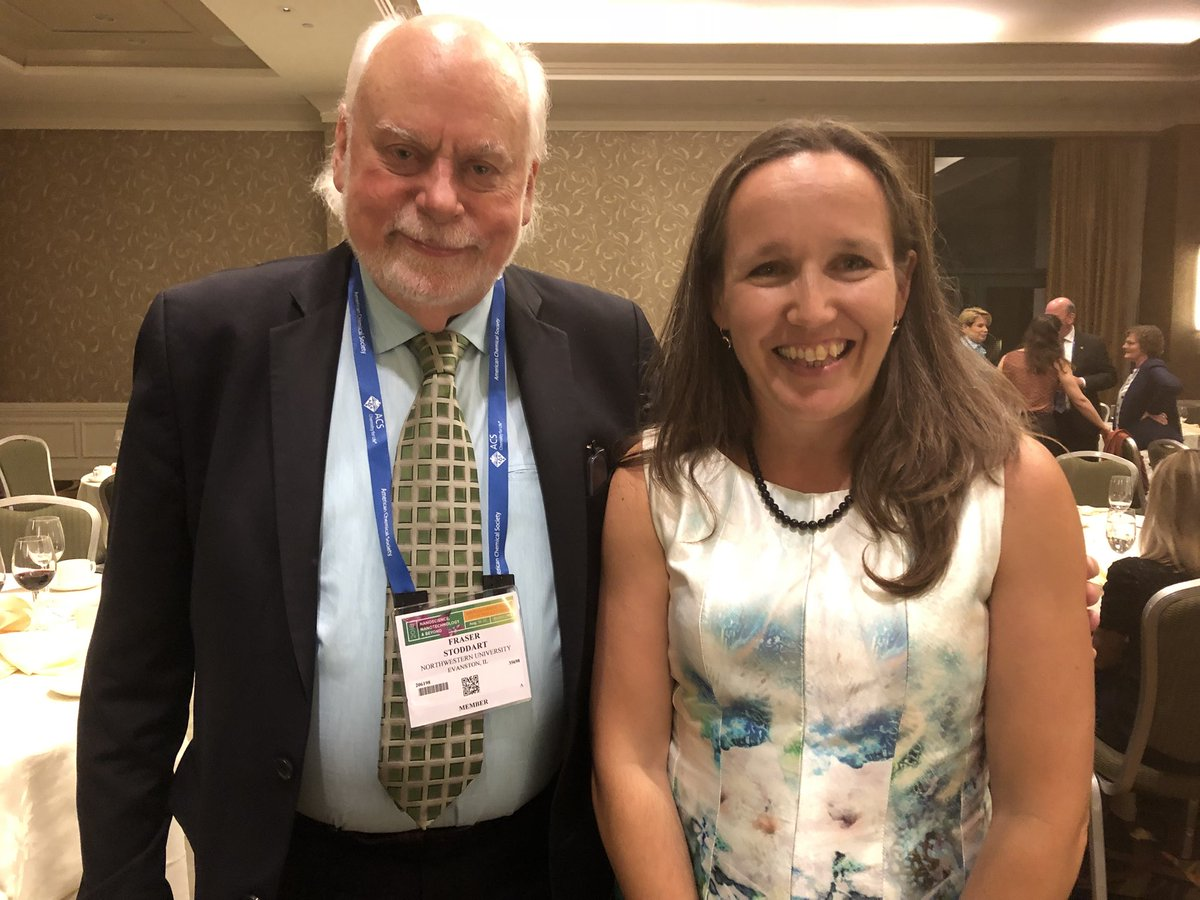
Campos Seijo and 2016 Nobel Prize in Chemistry laureate Sir Fraser Stoddart

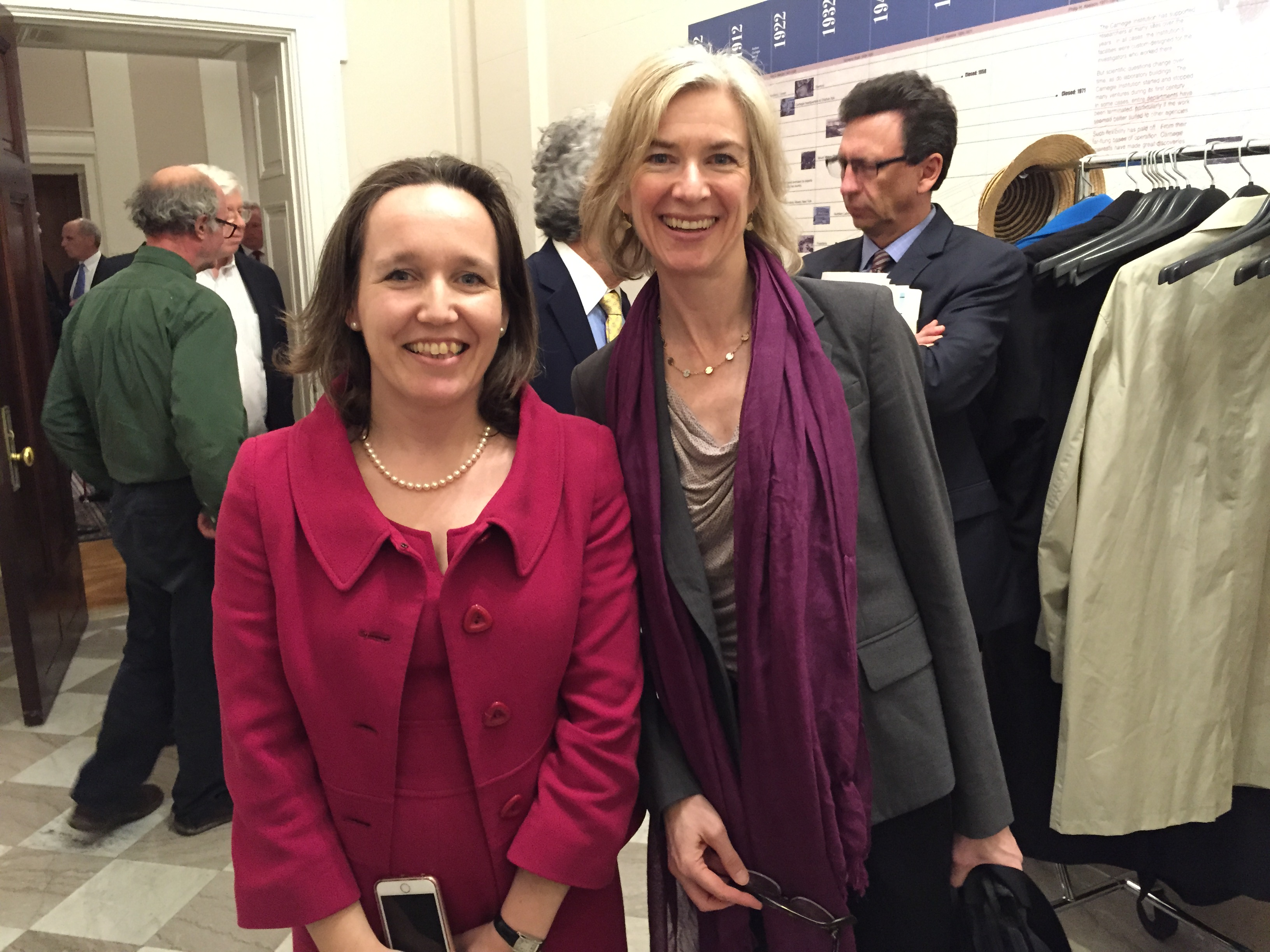
Campos Seijo and CRISPR co-inventor Jennifer Doudna

== Background ==
Campos Seijo received her BSc degree (licenciatura) in chemistry from the Universidad de Santiago de Compostela in Spain. Her doctoral studies were undertaken at Manchester Metropolitan University in the United Kingdom.

== Career and Outreach ==
Campos Seijo began her publishing career in the UK as a technical editor at the European Respiratory Society. Her first Editor-in-Chief assignment came as head of a suite of pharmaceutical technology titles at Advanstar Communications, now part of UBM. In 2009, she became Editor-in-Chief of Chemistry World, the monthly news magazine published by the Royal Society of Chemistry. In 2014 she took on her current role at C&EN and moved to Washington, DC.

Under Campos Seijo's leadership, C&EN has undergone a radical transformation, evolving into a modern media organization that is "home for ambitious journalism that reaches chemical scientists all over the world". C&EN's overhaul has resulted in new a complete revamp of the brand, including design, layout and user experience in print and online, as well as an editorial shift towards topical and global coverage.

This change has stimulated a greater focus on innovation and the development of a series of products aimed at supporting the digital expansion of the C&EN brand, including the implementation of a metered paywall, use of AI to drive its content recommendation engine or the launch of a voice skill for Amazon Echo devices.

Other initiatives of note include the establishment of internationally recognized awards programs, including the Talented 12 and the Brazilian Women in Chemistry and Related Sciences Award sponsored by C&EN and CAS, as well as content sharing partnerships for the distribution of C&EN content translated into Spanish, Chinese and Portuguese.

In 2017, Campos Seijo and her team at the ACS started a custom content studio aimed at serving the needs of chemical and pharmaceutical organizations inside C&EN, dubbed "C&EN BrandLab".

This transformation has garnered the magazine several accolades, including EXCEL's Best Feature Article, Folio:'s Overall Editorial Excellence and Long Form Feature Content, and Connectiv's Innovation awards.

To further the public image for chemistry, Campos Seijo presents at global scientific conferences as a publishing and outreach thought leader. She has appeared at the Conferencia Latino Americana de Quimica (CLAQ) in Havana, Cuba, the World Conference of Science Journalists (WCSJ) in San Francisco, US, and the European Chemical Society (EuChemS) conference in Liverpool, UK. in addition to prominent roles at most ACS National Meetings.

She has also shown support of the European and International Young Chemists Networks, her activities in Latin America and through C&EN by organizing the first sexual harassment symposium at an ACS National meeting as well as collaborating with the Gordon Research Conferences to 1 bring their Power Hour to ACS members.

At the end of 2024, Campos Seijo began a new role as senior editor and content director of Optics & Photonics News, a monthly magazine of optics-related news and feature articles published by the professional society Optica.

== Miscellanea ==
Outside of work, Campos Seijo is an avid powerlifter and in 2016 she broke a world record for her age and weight class. She volunteers as a member of the Board of Directors and Chair of the Education Committee for Association Media & Publishing. She is also a judge for the Esselen awards.
