= Saint-Vivien, Charente-Maritime =

Saint-Vivien
- Commune
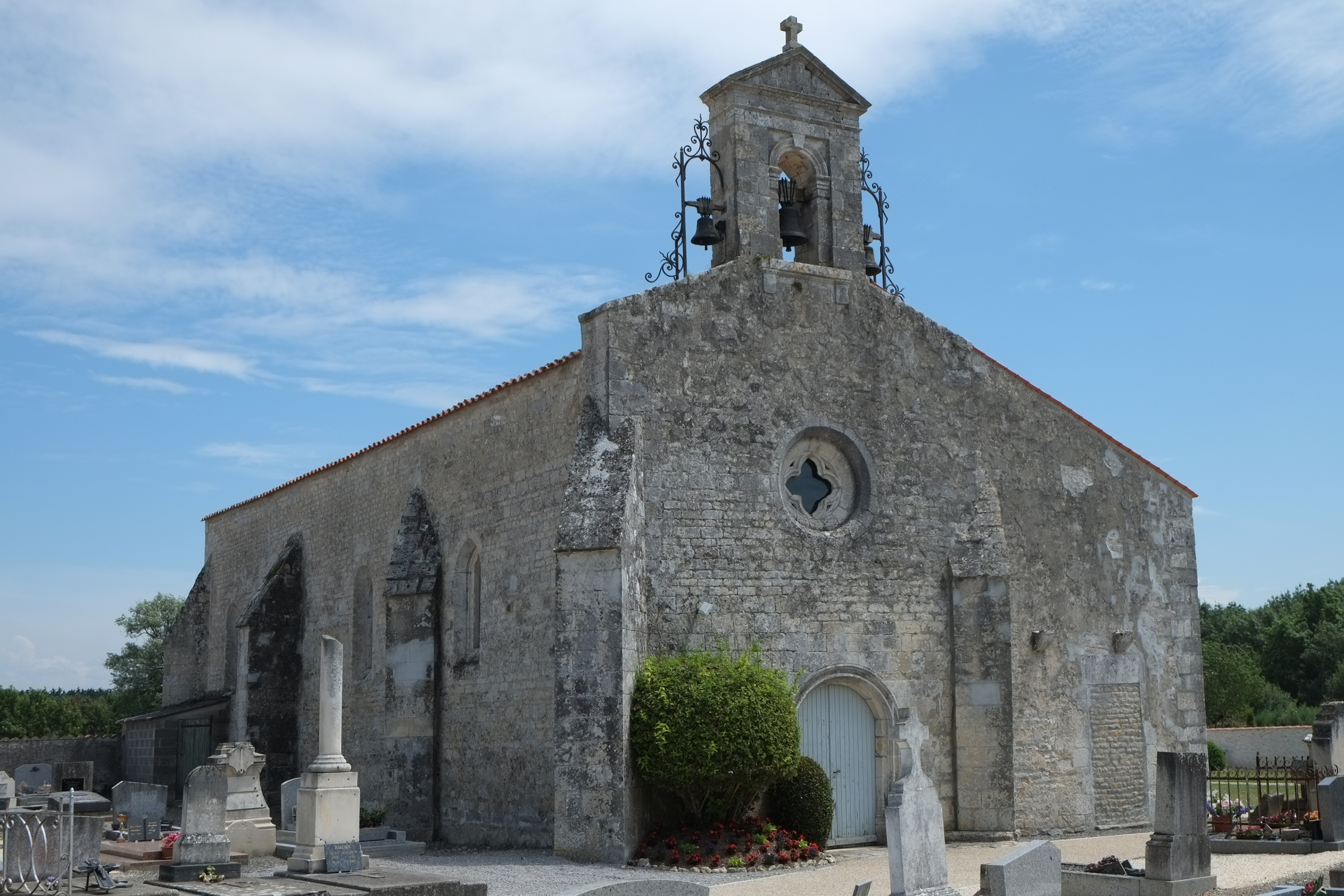
- The church in Saint-Vivien
- Location of Saint-Vivien
- Location within France Location within Nouvelle-Aquitaine
- Coordinates: 46°04′49″N 1°03′09″W
- Country: France
- Region: Nouvelle-Aquitaine
- Department: Charente-Maritime
- Arrondissement: La Rochelle
- Canton: Châtelaillon-Plage
- Intercommunality: CA La Rochelle

Government
  - Mayor (2020–2026): Vincent Demester
- Area^{1}: 8.27 km^{2} (3.19 sq mi)
- Elevation: 4 m (13 ft)
- Highest elevation: 27 m (89 ft)
- Lowest elevation: 1 m (3.3 ft)
- Population (2023): 1,436
  - Density: 174/km^{2} (450/sq mi)
- Time zone: UTC+01:00 (CET)
  - Summer (DST): UTC+02:00 (CEST)
- INSEE/Postal code: 17413 /17220
- ^{1} French Land Register data, which excludes lakes, ponds, glaciers > 1 km^{2} (0.386 sq mi or 247 acres) and river estuaries.

Saint-Vivien (French pronunciation: [sɛ̃ vivjɛ̃]) is a commune in the Charente-Maritime department in the Nouvelle-Aquitaine region in southwestern France.

== Population ==
Historical population
Year	Pop.	±% p.a.
1968	356	—
1975	382	+1.01%
1982	625	+7.29%
1990	702	+1.46%
1999	851	+2.16%
2007	874	+0.33%
2012	1,150	+5.64%
2017	1,307	+2.59%
2023	1,436	+1.58%
Source: INSEE

== See also ==
- Communes of the Charente-Maritime department
