= Salles-sur-Mer =

- Commune
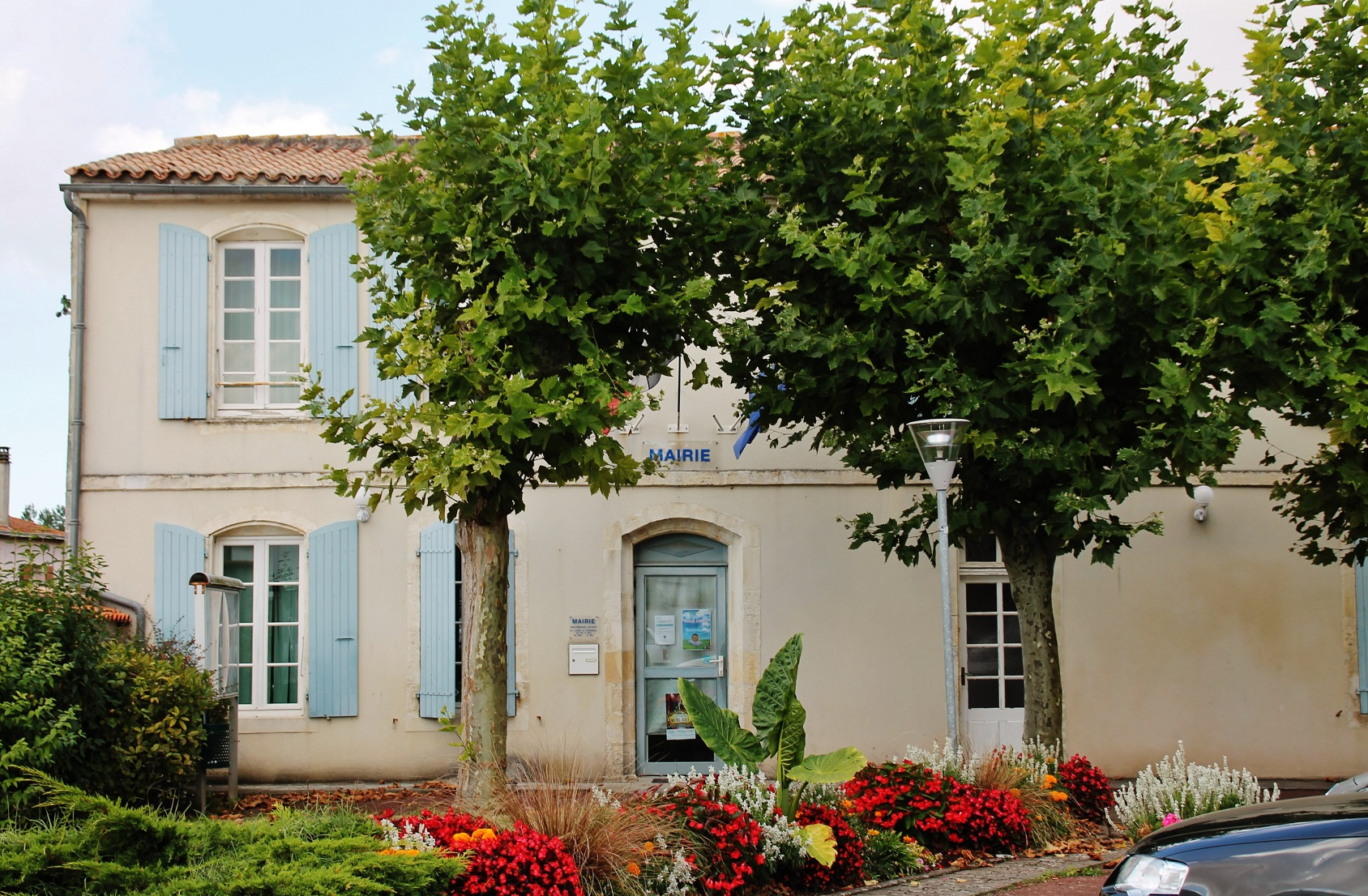
- The town hall in Salles-sur-Mer
- Location of Salles-sur-Mer
- Location within France Location within Nouvelle-Aquitaine
- Coordinates: 46°06′19″N 1°03′14″W
- Country: France
- Region: Nouvelle-Aquitaine
- Department: Charente-Maritime
- Arrondissement: La Rochelle
- Canton: Châtelaillon-Plage
- Intercommunality: CA La Rochelle

Government
  - Mayor (2020–2026): Chantal Guillebaud
- Area^{1}: 14.03 km^{2} (5.42 sq mi)
- Elevation: 8 m (26 ft)
- Highest elevation: 30 m (98 ft)
- Lowest elevation: 2 m (6.6 ft)
- Population (2023): 2,465
  - Density: 175.7/km^{2} (455.0/sq mi)
- Demonym: Sallésien·ne·s
- Time zone: UTC+01:00 (CET)
  - Summer (DST): UTC+02:00 (CEST)
- INSEE/Postal code: 17420 /17220
- ^{1} French Land Register data, which excludes lakes, ponds, glaciers > 1 km^{2} (0.386 sq mi or 247 acres) and river estuaries.

Salles-sur-Mer (French pronunciation: [sal syʁ mɛʁ]) is a commune in the Charente-Maritime department, region of Nouvelle-Aquitaine (formerly Poitou-Charentes), southwestern France.

== Population ==
Historical population
Year	Pop.	±% p.a.
1968	647	—
1975	926	+5.26%
1982	1,369	+5.74%
1990	1,441	+0.64%
1999	1,611	+1.25%
2007	1,984	+2.64%
2012	2,056	+0.72%
2017	2,153	+0.93%
2023	2,465	+2.28%
Source: INSEE

== See also ==
- Communes of the Charente-Maritime department
