= Viviana Zocco =

Argentine businesswoman

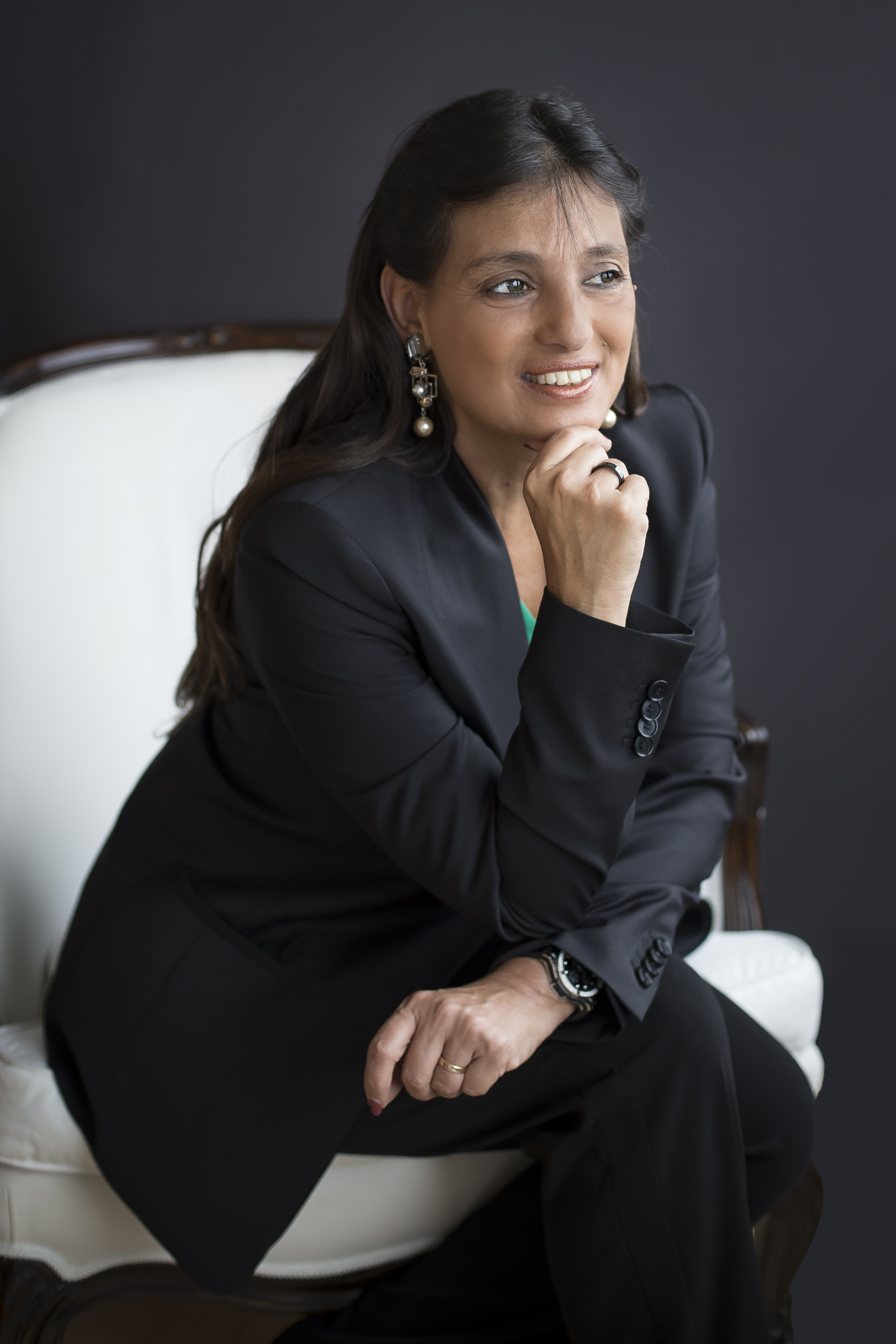
- Viviana Zocco
- Born: Buenos Aires, Argentina
- Occupations: Entrepreneur, businesswoman
- Spouse: Daniel Hadad
- Children: 4
- Website: www.grupovi-da.com

Viviana Zocco is an Argentine businesswoman, born in Buenos Aires, Argentina. She is founder and CEO of Grupo VI-DA and VI-DATEC, companies dedicated to technological development applied to culture, education and entertainment, with offices in Argentina, Colombia, Mexico and the United States. Some of the most well-known companies belonging to Group VI-DA are: TICMAS, BajaLibros, InterCultural Division, GrandesLibros, Leamos, the entertainment platform TKM, 2 among others. Zocco is considered one of the most successful women entrepreneurs in Latin America.

In 2012, Zocco was featured as a case study in Una mirada a las emprendedoras de alto impacto en Argentina, a study commissioned by the Multilateral Investment Fund (FOMIN), a member of the Inter-American Development Bank Group. The report examined her career as a female entrepreneur, including the creation of Risk Analysis, its acquisition by Standard & Poor's, and her subsequent ventures in media and digital businesses.

In 2016 she became Chapter Leader in Argentina of the international women's organization UPWARD Women

== Biography ==
=== Standard & Poor's ===
In 1992, Zocco co-founded, with Diana Mondino, Risk Analysis S.A., one of the first local rating agencies in Argentina that, owing to its success, was acquired in 1995 by Standard & Poor's, with Zocco taking on the role at S&P as Managing Director for Latin America Origination business, and Buenos Aires Office Head. The acquisition of Risk Analysis by Standard and Poor's was published and studied by Babson College and it can be found as a study case in Harvard Business Review.

=== Grupo VI-DA ===
In 2005, Zocco founded TKM, a magazine aimed towards the teenage audience. Given TKM's success it evolved into an online community and became the most influential Hispanic-speaking media for millennials in Latin America and the United States. TKM has presence in multiple platforms and is a trendsetter in its communication style, taking over the millennial audience first in Argentina and then in Brasil, Colombia, Mexico and the United States.

That same year she founded 10Musica, currently known as Bajamusica.com, a digital music store based in Latin America, which consists of more than one million songs for download to any device.

She founded BajaLibros,

=== TICMAS ===
In 2019, Zocco founded TICMAS, an educational technology platform developed in Argentina. The platform focuses on digital transformation in education by offering interactive content, personalized learning resources, and classroom management tools for teachers and students.

Since its launch, TICMAS has expanded across Latin America and collaborated with international technology companies. In 2021, it partnered with Google for Education to promote digital learning and teacher training initiatives in the region.

In 2022, TICMAS received an international investment to support its regional expansion and technological development. The same year, it was recognized by Holon IQ as one of the twenty most innovative educational technology companies in Latin America, and in 2023 it was included among the top one hundred EdTech companies worldwide.

TICMAS provides educational solutions for public and private institutions, emphasizing personalized learning pathways, student progress tracking, and continuous professional development for educators.

== Achievements and awards ==
In 2016 Viviana Zocco won the Gold Stevie Award for Women in Business for Female Entrepreneur or Executive of the Year in Mexico, Central & South America.
