= Bibiane =

Bibiane or Bibian is a feminine given name. Notable people with the name include:

- Bibian Mentel (1972–2021), Dutch Paralympic snowboarder
- Bibian Norai (born 1967), Spanish pornographic actress
- Bibiane Schoofs (born 1988), Dutch tennis player
- Bibiane Schulze (born 1998), German and Spanish footballer
- Carola-Bibiane Schönlieb (born 1979), Austrian mathematician
