= Optics and Photonics News =

Optics & Photonics News is the membership magazine of Optica. It is published monthly (with a double issue in July/August) and covers developments in optics, photonics, and related topics in physics and engineering. It was established in 1975 as Optics News. The magazine adopted a regular bimonthly publication schedule beginning in 1982 and transitioned to monthly publication in 1985. The name of the publication was changed to Optics & Photonics News in January 1990, in light of the dramatic growth of photonics as a new discipline in the wake of the discovery of the laser. The format of the magazine has evolved from a newsletter format to a glossy magazine.

Since 1982, the last issue of each year has included a "year in optics" feature, including summaries of some of the most notable work in optics and photonic science and engineering over the previous 12 months.
