= Chipangali =

Chipangali Wildlife Orphanage
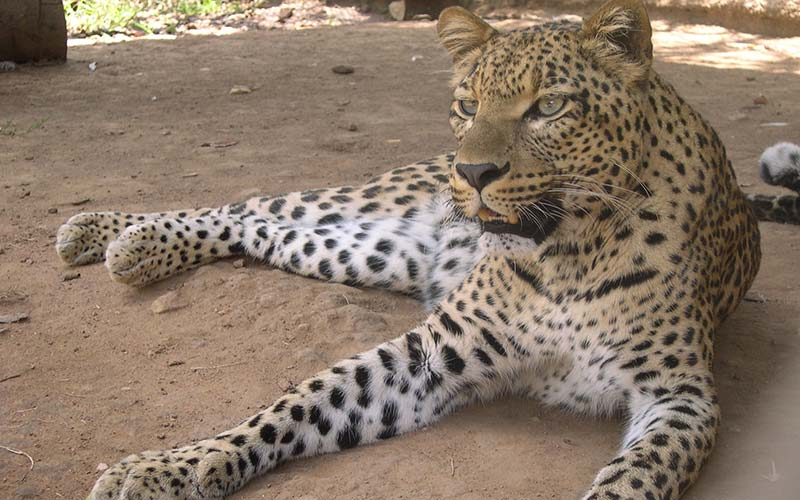
- Roxy the Leopard
- Date opened: 1973
- Location: Gwanda, Bulawayo, Zimbabwe
- Major exhibits: Aquarium, Aviary, Carnivores, Mammals, Primates Reptiles

Chipangali Wildlife Orphanage is a not-for-profit organisation dedicated to the rescue and care of orphaned, injured, abandoned, abused or confiscated wild animals in Zimbabwe. It is located in Bulawayo, Zimbabwe.

== Mission ==
Wherever possible, rescued animals and birds are rehabilitated and returned to the wild. If safe release into their natural habitat is not possible, animals are cared for and kept for educational purposes and zoological study. In the case of endangered species, captive breeding programs may also be undertaken.

Since 1973, Chipangali has been a haven for wild animals which have little hope for survival in the wild – creatures which have been orphaned, abandoned, injured, born in captivity or brought up unsuccessfully as pets. It is often the last refuge for those brought in sick or injured, and increasingly it is a sanctuary for confiscated animals.

== History ==
The wildlife Orphanage was established in 1973 by ex-game ranger Vivian Wilson (now late) and his wife Paddy (now late), and its primary function is to offer a home to orphaned, abandoned and sick wild animals.

Chipangali Wildlife Orphanage is a registered Welfare Organization (38/77) in Zimbabwe.

The word Chipangali comes from the Chinyanja language in eastern Zambia where Viv Wilson originally began his career with the Zambia Government as a tsetse-fly control operator. It is here that the whole concept of Chipangali was born and derived. The word means ‘open friendly country’.

Chipangali founder Viv Wilson and his wife Paddy retired from the active side of running the Orphanage over ten years ago. Viv has been the leading instigator of several unique projects, such a ten-year survey of the duikers of Africa which culminated in the 800 page masterpiece named Duikers of Africa, Masters of the African Forest Floor. Recently Viv has expanded his research activities to include a survey of the leopard and cheetah of Zimbabwe, the biodiversity of the Matobo National Park and the formation of the CRI (Carnivore Research Institute)

=== Patrons ===
Her Royal Highness, Diana, Princess of Wales was Chipangali's patron from 1983 until her death, when the Princess Diana Trust took over the role.

== Functions ==
1. Wildlife Orphanage/ Animal Rehabilitation Centre: To provide a service to rescue and care for injured wildlife, thereby providing a home for the many injured, sick, orphaned, abused, confiscated or abandoned wild animals from anywhere in Zimbabwe.
2. Education: to educate the Zimbabwe public, especially young children, with the aid of live viewing of many species not easily seen in the wild. Provide relevant lectures, film and slide shows for visiting groups. Thus providing a local resource centre for children to appreciate the important value of Zimbabwe's natural heritage.
3. Nature Conservation: to teach people and especially children, to appreciate the wonder and variety of indigenous wildlife and not to take it for granted that these animals or their environment will not always be there for their enjoyment without the correct management of our natural resources.

== Exhibits ==
From the entrance, to the left a visitor walks through the enclosures of the mammals. And to the right there is the Barry Wilson Aviary, dedicated to the late son of Chipangali founders. The aviary is home to different types of birds. Then there is the Carnivores section with a high number of lions and a few leopards. In the carnivores section you can view the lions and leopards at a very close range but they will be enclosed in a fence. You can also get a better view of the lions from the Judith lookout. There is also an enclosure for monkeys and there are many monkeys in the cages.
