= Vivian Conley =

American civil rights activist

Vivian Conley (1922–1993) was a civil rights activist active in Muncie, Indiana. During the 1950s she was part of the campaign to desegregate Tuhey Pool, and during the 1970s she was part of the campaign to end the use of Confederate flag symbols at Southside High School.

In addition to her civil rights work, for twenty years she served as the education coordinator for Trinity United Methodist Church. She also founded Ball State University's Nontraditional Student Association. She herself attended Ball State University at the same time as her own daughter and three of her grandsons.

The Conley Library on Centennial Avenue in Muncie, which has closed, was named in her honor. The Vivian Conley Award is named after her, as is the Vivian Conley Memorial Scholarship Fund (a "Ball State University scholarship for nontraditional, part-time students who demonstrate a commitment to the betterment of our community.") The Vivian Conley Award is given to women who work in art, business, community service, education, environment, health, humanitarian aid, and religion.
