= Vivian Holt =

American singer (1885–1945)

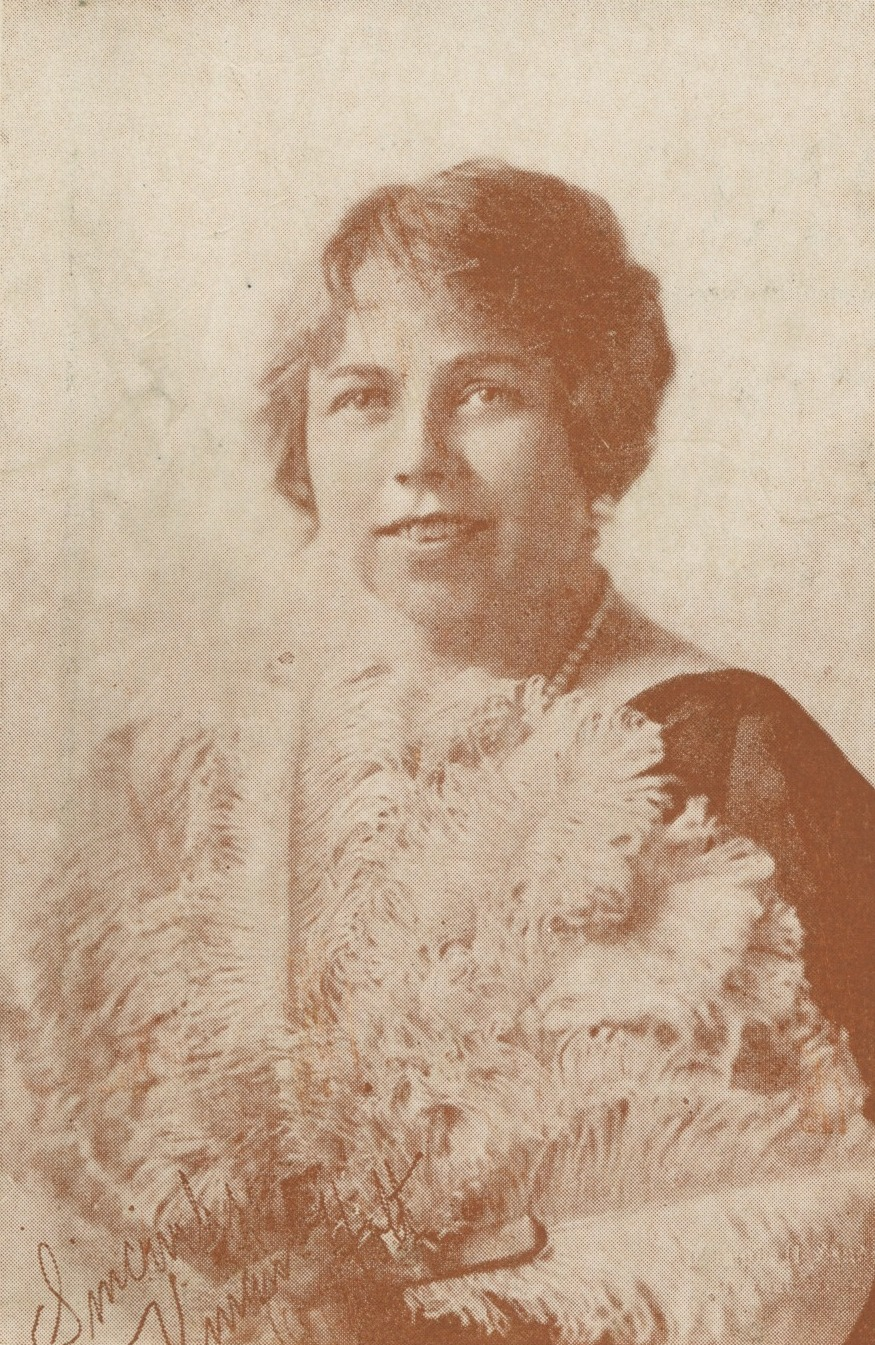
- Vivian Holt, from about 1920
- Born: Vivian Grace Holt; May 10, 1885; Peru, Indiana, U.S.
- Died: July 7, 1945 (age 60); New York, New York, U.S.
- Other names: Vivienne Holt, Vivian Holt-Ruben
- Occupations: Singer, actress

Vivian Grace Holt (May 10, 1885 – July 7, 1945), also known as Vivienne Holt and Vivian Holt-Ruben, was an American soprano singer who performed in vaudeville, on Broadway, in recordings and on radio, usually paired with pianist and composer Lillian Rosedale Goodman.

== Early life and education ==
Holt was born in Peru, Indiana, the daughter of Clarence Edwin Holt and Adele Durand Holt. Her parents divorced in 1895; her father was later found guilty of bigamy. Her father was an actor, and her mother was an actress, so she was on the stage from early childhood. She trained as a singer with Lazar Samoiloff and Francis Stuart. "She is a good example of the Samoiloff bel canto method of singing," reported Musical Courier in 1916. "Her breath control is perfect. Her pianos and crescendos, fortes and diminuendos are exquisite. Her trills and staccatos and her tone attack in general is delightful to hear."

== Career ==
Holt was a coloratura soprano singer. She was featured in a concert held at Ella Backus-Behr's New York City studio in 1911. From 1913 to 1915, she was sometimes billed as Vivian Holt-Ruben.

Holt made dozens of recordings between 1913 and 1929, mostly for the Victor label, many of them duets with pianist Lillian Rosedale Goodman. She and Rosedale sang together in vaudeville and lyceum circuits in the 1910s. Holt performed in Broadway musicals with Rosedale, including Hello, Alexander (1919) with Sophie Tucker, and Red Pepper (1922).

Holt introduced Rosedale to Chicago lawyer Mark O. Goodman, which led to Rosedale's marriage in 1921, and the end of the women's professional partnership. Holt made recordings and toured with Myrtle Leonard in 1923 and 1924, and sang with tenor Robert Roberts in 1926. Holt and Rosedale were back together for a radio concert in 1931. In her later years she was an actress in radio programs.

"My Isle of Golden Dreams" (1919) by Walter Blaufuss, Gus Kahn; cover of sheet music featuring Holt and Rosedale

== Personal life ==
Holt was married briefly, and had a daughter, Eleanor Ruben. Holt died from a heart attack in 1945, at the age of 60, in New York City.
