= Vivianus (jurist) =

2nd century Roman jurist

Vivianus was a Roman jurist of the second century. Ulpian quotes his decision with regard to whether slaves behaving in a strange or unbalanced manner should be considered defective goods, so that a purchaser could return them for a refund.

== Vivianus' opinion ==
Under the law as stated by the aediles, property could be returned for vitium, a fault or defect; but Vivianus gives the example of a slave who formerly behaved as if under some religious hysteria, but no longer did so. In this case, he explained, there was no longer any vitium, and a purchaser could no more bring an action against the seller for sale of defective goods than if the slave had been sick, but since recovered. If, on the other hand, the slave persisted in his fanatical behaviour, then a vitium could still be said to exist; but Vivianus still concluded that the purchaser would have no action, because the aediles only intended for an action to be brought in the case of physical defects, and not mental ones.
