= Vivian Abenshushan =

Mexican writer

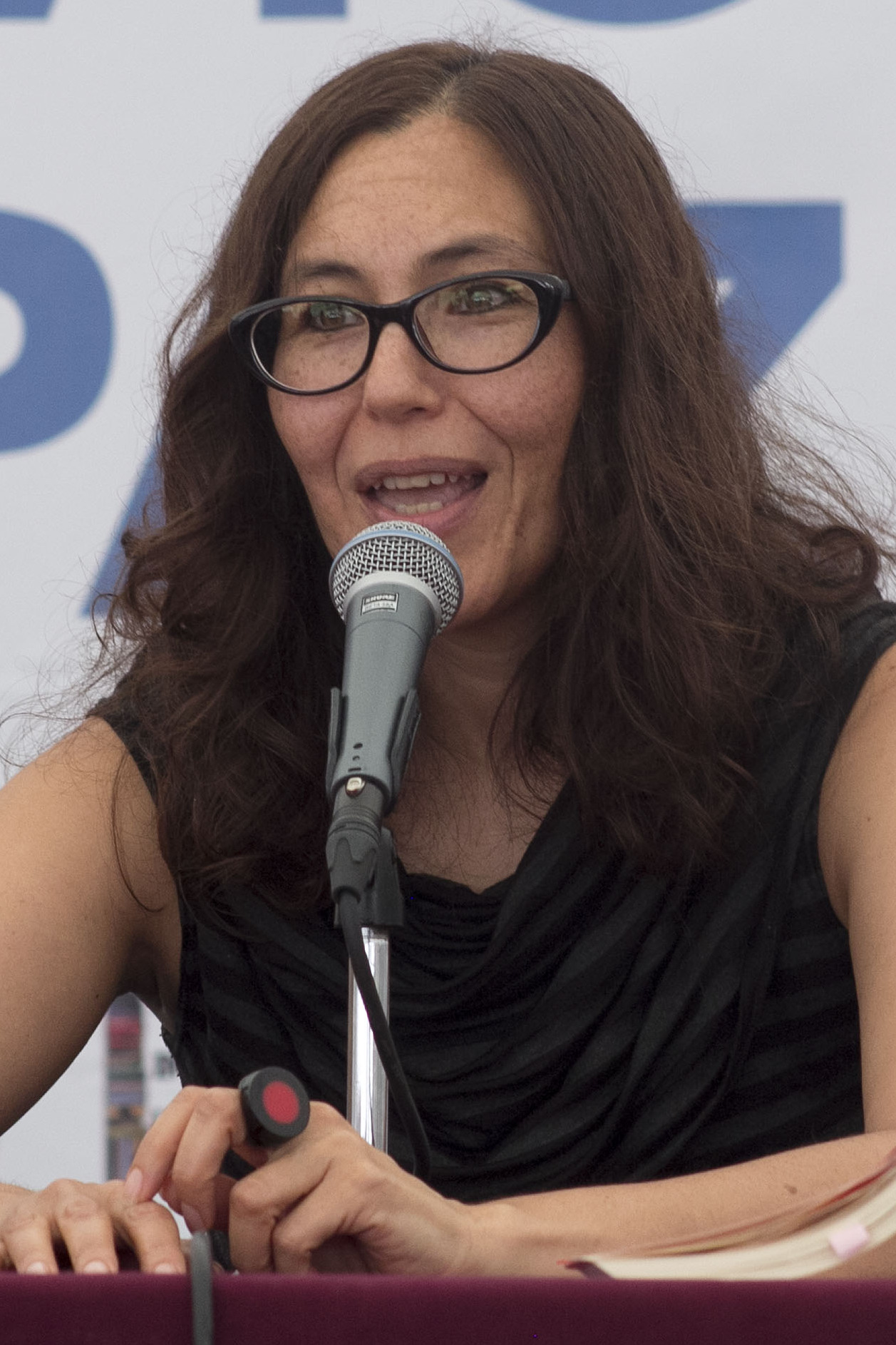
- Abenshushan in 2014
- Born: June 23, 1972 (53 years old); Mexico City, Mexico
- Education: Universidad Nacional Autónoma de Mexico
- Occupation: Writer

Vivian Abenshushan (born June 23, 1972, in Mexico City) is a Mexican interdisciplinary writer and editor. In her work, she combines literature with new technologies and experimentation. She has won notable literary awards. Abenshushan's career has been defined by her resistance to the fast-paced logic of capitalist labor. She has openly reflected on her own exhaustion and on how "turbo-capitalism" seeps into intellectual and artistic spheres, shaping how creativity is valued.

== Biography ==
She studied Hispanic Language and Literature at the Department of Philosophy and Letters of the National Autonomous University of Mexico. "In a risky and enthusiastic race towards Non-Doong (always in tension with her secret impulses of hyperactivity), she resigned from academia at 25, from "forced work" at 32, and when she was 33, she founded the independent publishing house Tumbona Ediciones, under Lafarguiano's motto: 'The universal right to laziness.' Abenshushan has contributed to magazines such as La Tempestad, Your Impossible Voice, Southwest Review, Etiqueta Negra, Horizontal, Letras Libres, Luvina, Paréntesis, and Tierra Adentro, among others. Her decision to leave both academia and what she calls "forced work" reflects a radical stance: she sees writing not merely as a profession but as a form of resistance against productivity-driven capitalist structures.

She is considered part of the literary movement known as the Nonexistent Generation. Some critics have described her work as exo canonical, experimental, peripheral, and anti-systemic.

Throughout her career, Abenshushan has been active not only as a writer but also as a cultural organizer. Her Laboratorio de Escritura Expandida, launched in 2001, is an itinerant workshop that treats writing as an open field connected with other artistic languages --- from sound poetry and performance to visual experimentation. This laboratory has been hostage by prestigious institutions in Mexico and internationally, underscoring her recognition as a thinker who bridges art, literature, and activism.

In 2004, she published El clan de los insomnes (Tusques Editores), which won the 2002 Giberto Owen National Literature Prize. In 2007, she published Una habitación desordenada (El Equilibrista), and in 2009, Julio Ramón Ribeyro (Nostra Edicion), among other notable publications. Through her project Escritos para desocupados, she has offered a critique of current working conditions and the implicit violence they entail, drawing on the experience of voluntary employment. The text blends manifesto, essay, logbook, chronicle, pamphlet, critical theory, and a website published by Surplus under a copyleft license that allows free reproduction and digital download. As a website, Escritos para desocupados uses hyperlinks to expand in different directions, leading to a variety of audiovisual resources and documents gathered during Abenshushan's research. In 2005, alongside Luigi Amara, Abenshushan founded the independent cooperative publishing house Tumbona Ediciones, which focuses on intersections between literature, art, and politics.

In 2019, she published Permanente obra negra (Sexto piso), as an experimental writing project based on skyping, rewriting, transcription, and the assembly of quotations. It is a "novel-essay" or fictional essay, also known as Novela inexperta (provisional title). This book is many books, never the same one, and has been published in four formats: book, file, die-cutting plates, and internet algorithm.

Abenshushan has developed literary, discursive, and aesthetic strategies that confront the production processes of contemporary capitalism and the structures of cultural production. Her essays also examine the relationship between art and political action, as well as intersections among social disciplines, such as feminism and affective networks, cooperative processes in writing, and other pedagogies, with writing as an expanded territory at the center.

Abenshushan has also researched other avant-garde and post-avant-garde artistic movements, such as Fluxus, from which she founded the workshop Laboratorio de Escritura Expandida in 2001. This itinerant, multidisciplinary workshop experimented with correspondences and relationships between artistic languages, including performance writing, sound poetry, and visual poetry, among others. According to Abenshushan, the workshop is a "mix of exaltation, irreverence, and sudden visions." The Laboratory has been hosted by various institutions in Mexico and abroad, including the Museo Universitario de Arte Contemporáneo, The Jumex Collection, the Benemerita Universidad Autónoma de Puebla, the Museo de Ciencias y Artes de la UNAM, the Universidad Iberoamericana, the Centro Cultural Tijuana, the SOMA, the Instituto Cervantes en Paris, the Universidad del Claustro de Sor Juana, among others.

Her work appeared in national and international anthologies, including Best of Contemporary Mexican Fiction (Dalkey Archive, 2008) and Voix du Mexique, 16 écrivains contemporains (2009). El futuro no es nuestro—narradores de América Latina nacidos entre 1970 y 1980.

=== Critical scholarships and interpretation ===
Scholars like Vicente Luis Mora have analyzed Permanente obra negra as a "work that employs fragmentary narrative, multiple modes of cognition, and reticularity (a network-like structure) to propose a new narrative poetics for the 21st century." The text is self-aware of its incompleteness, as much about what is left out as what is present.

Her work often intersects with debates around appropriation, citation, public domain, and open source, exploring how texts are borrowed, reused, and shared, and how ownership of literary works is constructed and challenged. Permanente obra negra is critiqued for developing forms of "apropriación diversa" or "misappropriation" where texts are reclaimed by readers/community rather than strictly controlled by author/publisher.

== Works ==
- 2004 - El clan de los insomnes, México, Tusquets, 160 páginas.
- 2007 - Una habitación desordenada, México, El Equilibrista / Universidad Nacional Autónoma de México, 108 páginas.
- 2009 - Julio Ramón Ribeyro, México, Nostra Ediciones, 61 páginas.
- 2013 - Escritos para desocupados, Surplus Ediciones.
- 2019 - Permanente obra negra, Sexto piso, p. 464.
- 2024 - Exiliados del tiempo lento, No Libros, Barcelona, 183 páginas.

=== In collaboration ===
- Tsunami. La suma de voces del feminismo, Editorial Sexto Piso, México, 2018.
- Prras! Cartas públicas a mujeres del arte, Tamara Ibarra, Nelly César, Valeria Montoya, Sandra Sánchez, Wendy Cabrera y Vivian Abenshushan (comps.), Prass! Ed., México, 2018.
- HUNN. Art / Reflection from Mexico, Editorial RM, México, 2017.
- Fe de erratas / Arte y política, Pierre Valls (comp.), Museo de la Memoria / Centro de Expresiones Contemporáneas, México, 2016
- Itinerarios de la cultura contemporánea en México, 17, Instituto de Estudios Críticos, México, 2016.
- Sólo cuento, Ignacio Padilla (comp.), UNAM, México, 2014.
- El hacha puesta en la raíz. Ensayistas mexicanos para el siglo XXI, Verónica Murguía y Geney Beltrán Félix (comps.), Conaculta, 2006.
- Función privada: los escritores y sus películas, México, Cineteca Nacional, 211 páginas, 2004.
- Crónicas de infancia, Usted está aquí, Jorale / Orfila Valenti, 2007, 111 páginas, Colección contracorriente.
- Best of contemporary mexican fiction, Champaign / Dalkey Archive Press, 2009
- Revolución 10.10, Instituto Mexicano de Cinematografía/ Random House Mondadori / Conaculta, 2010.
- Rivera Garza, Cristina. Allí te comerán las turicatas, (prólogo), La Caja de Cerillos Ediciones, México, 2013.
- De un nuevo modo. Antología de cuento mexicano actual (UNAM, 2013)
- A papalotear, 20 años del Papalote Museo del niño, México, Papaplote Museo del niño, 2013, 146 páginas, ilustraciones.
- La felicidad y lo absurdo: Albert Camus en el centenario de su nacimiento, México, Tusquets Editores, 2013, 120 páginas.

=== Articles ===
- La música de Morton Feldman en México, Pauta, México, vol. 23, n. 94, abril-junio, p. 35 - 41.

=== Collective expositions ===
- Palabras, palabras, palabras, Museo Comunitario Sierra Hermosa, 2019.
- Studio Visit, Zona de Desgaste, 2019.
- Prras! El sonido del techo de cristal que se rompe, Ladrón Galería, 2018.
- Todos los originales serán destruidos, Galería Libertad, 2016.

== Awards and recognitions ==
- 1999, 2001 y 2007 - Becaria de Jóvenes Creadores del Fondo Nacional para la Cultura y las Artes
- 2002 - Premio Nacional de Literatura Gilberto Owen
