= Santa Bibiana =

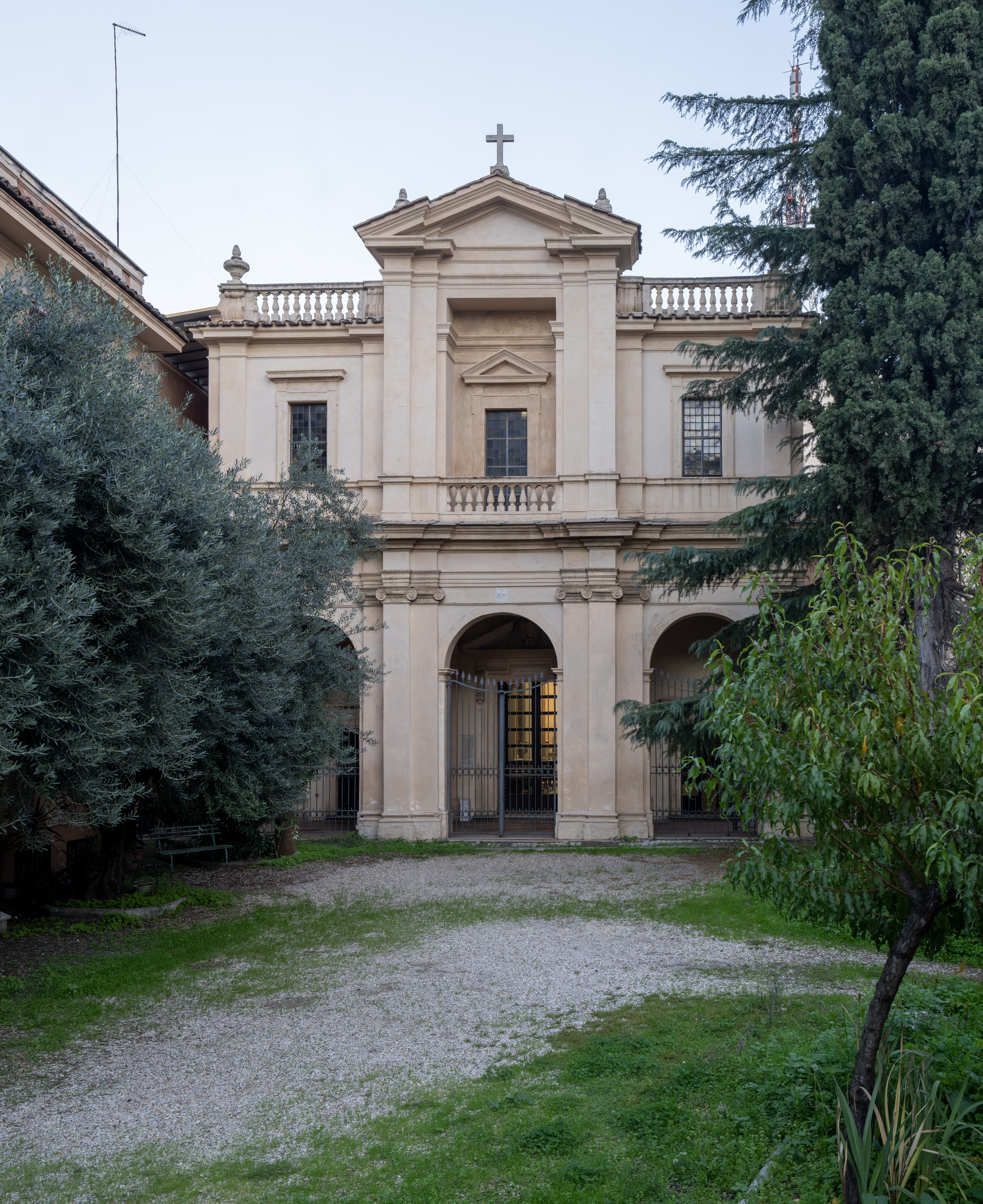
- Facade of Santa Bibiana
- Click on the map for a fullscreen view.
- 41°53′43.99″N 12°30′33.08″E
- Location: Rome
- Country: Italy
- Denomination: Roman Catholic

History
- Dedication: Saint Bibiana

Architecture
- Architect: Gian Lorenzo Bernini
- Architectural type: Church
- Style: Baroque
- Completed: 1626

Santa Bibiana is a small Baroque style, Roman Catholic church in Rome dedicated to Bibiana of Rome. The church façade was designed and built by Gian Lorenzo Bernini, who also produced a sculpture of the saint holding the palm leaf of martyrs.

== History ==
According to an ancient, not documented tradition, the church was built in 363 by Roman matron Olimpina (or Olimpia) on the house where, during the supposed persecution of emperor Julian (361–363), Bibiana, her mother Dafrosa and her sister Demetria would have suffered martyrdom, while her father Flavian of Montefiascone would have been exiled and martyred in a place called ad Aquas Taurinas (perhaps the present Montefiascone). The church rose in the area of the Horti Liciniani, not far from the nymphaeum usually known as Temple of Minerva Medica. Near the church there was an ancient cemetery, called ad ursum pileatum.

On the other hand, according to the Liber Pontificalis the church was erected in 476 under the pontificate of Pope Simplicius. Pope Leo II (682-683) moved there the relics of Martyrs Simplicus, Faustinus and Beatrix from the Generosa Catacombs. The same Pope built in the surroundings (iuxta Sanctam Vivianam) a church consecrated to Saint Paul, no longer extant. The church was restored by Pope Honorius III in 1224.

The present facade was designed and built by then 26-year-old Gian Lorenzo Bernini from 1624 to 1626, as commissioned by Pope Urban VIII. The columns lining the nave are from the original fifth-century church.

The church houses a statue of the titular saint, also by Bernini (1626). It shows St. Bibiana holding the palm leaf of martyrs, standing next to the column to which she was to be martyred.

The frescoes on the walls are by Pietro da Cortona (left) and Agostino Ciampelli (right).

The bodies of St Bibiana (Viviana or Vibiana), her mother Dafrosa and her sister Demetria were discovered inside a third-century sarcophagus, and now rest inside an alabaster urn under the major altar. The column just inside the church is said to be the one Bibiana was strapped to.

The church of Santa Bibiana is located in 154 via Giovanni Giolitti in Rome, adjacent to Termini Station and not far from the so-called "Temple of Minerva Medica".

== Gallery ==
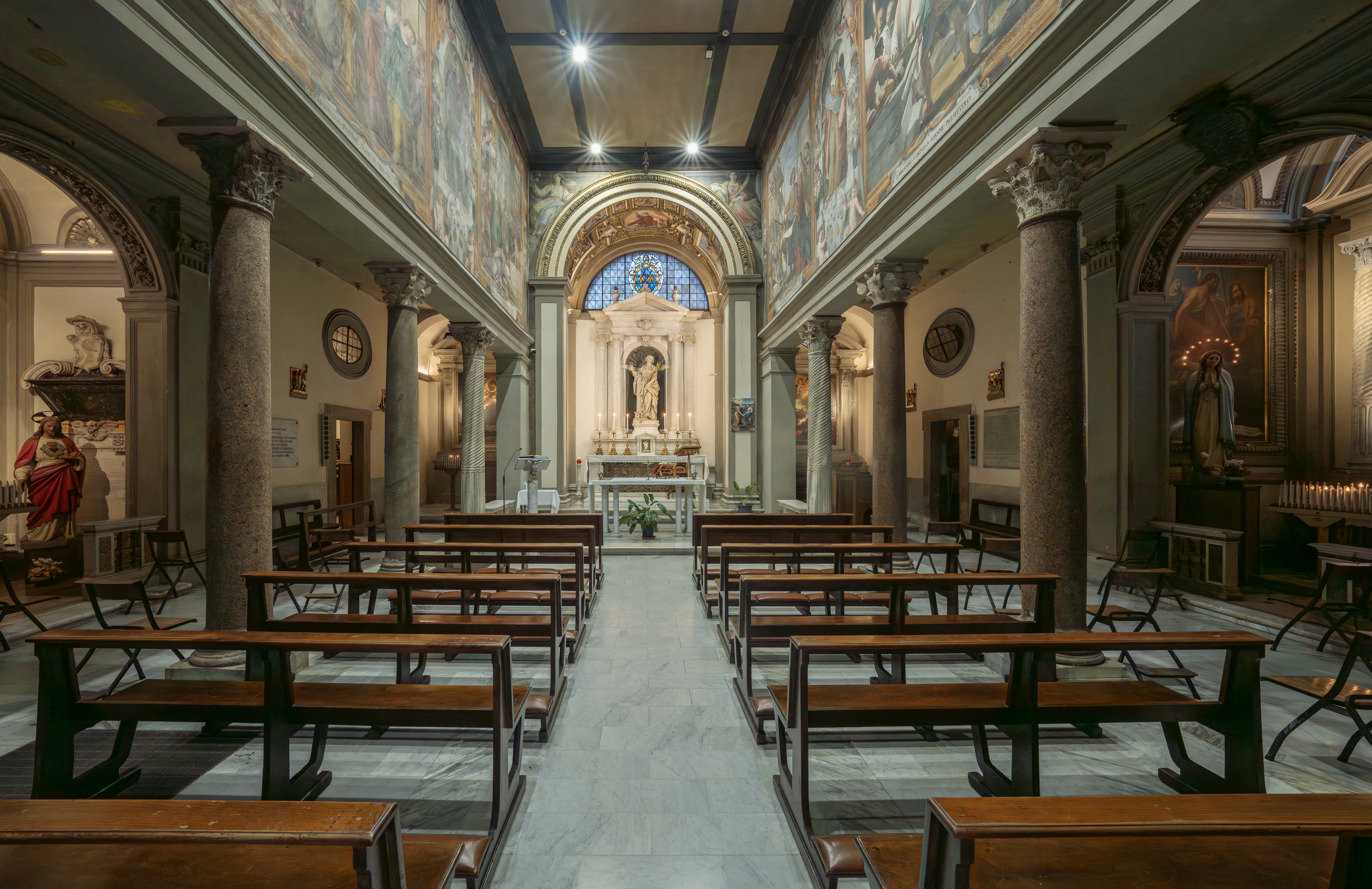
Interior

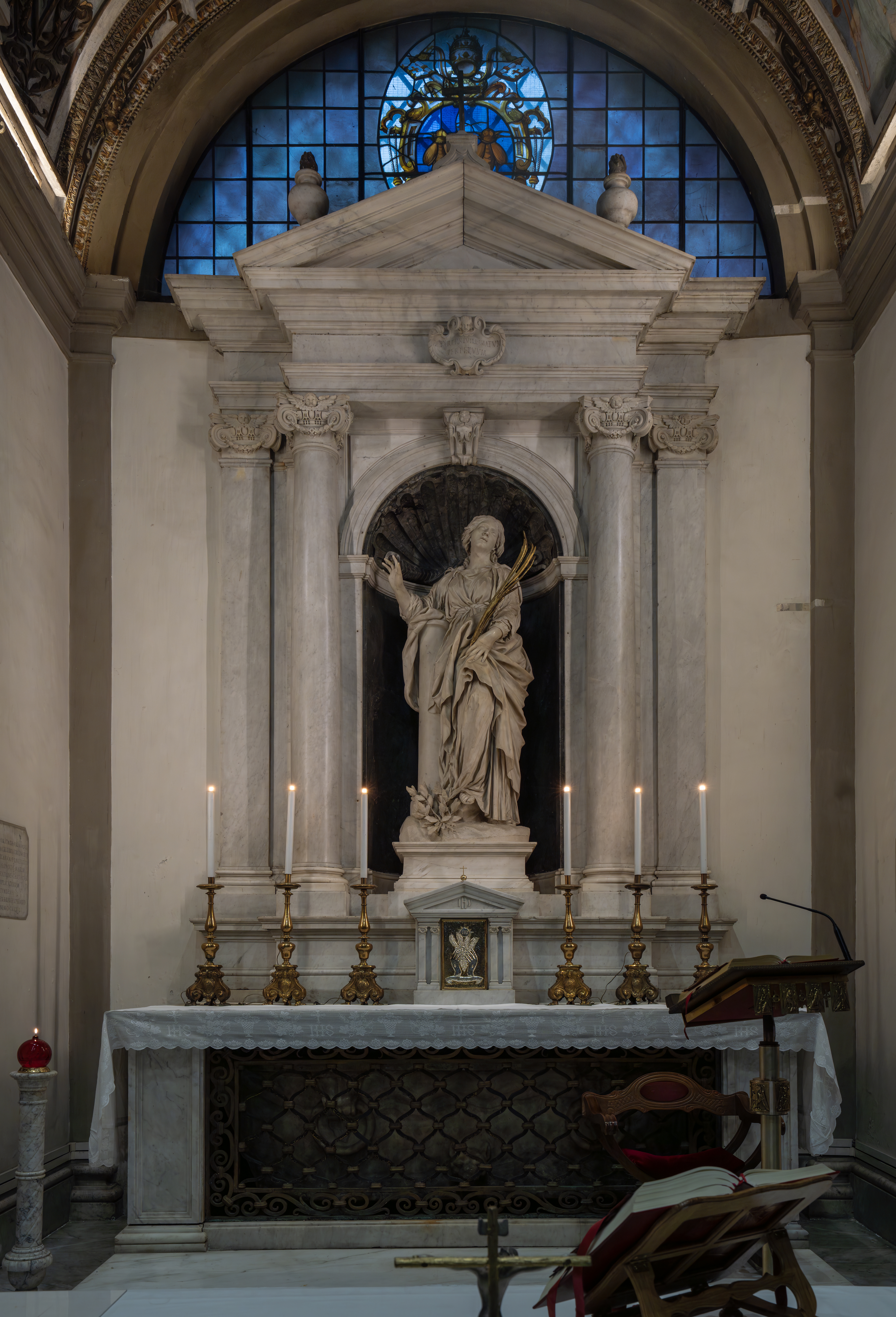
Statue of Saint Bibiana by Gian Lorenzo Bernini

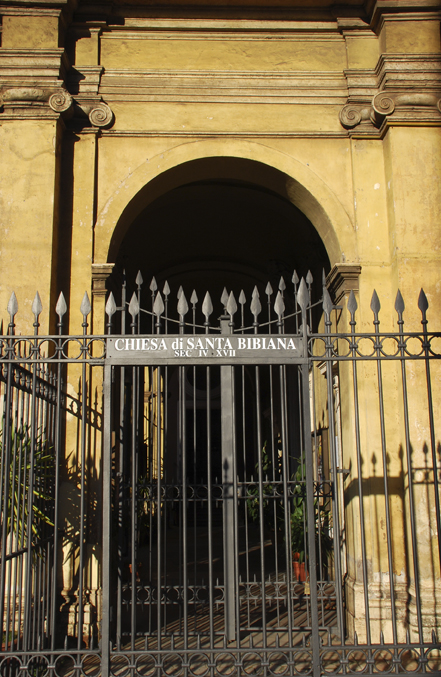
Front gate

== See also ==
- List of works by Gian Lorenzo Bernini
