= Saint Vivianus =

French bishop of Saintes

Vivianus (also Bibianus; died c. 490) was an early saint of the French (Francian) church and the first known bishop of Saintes.

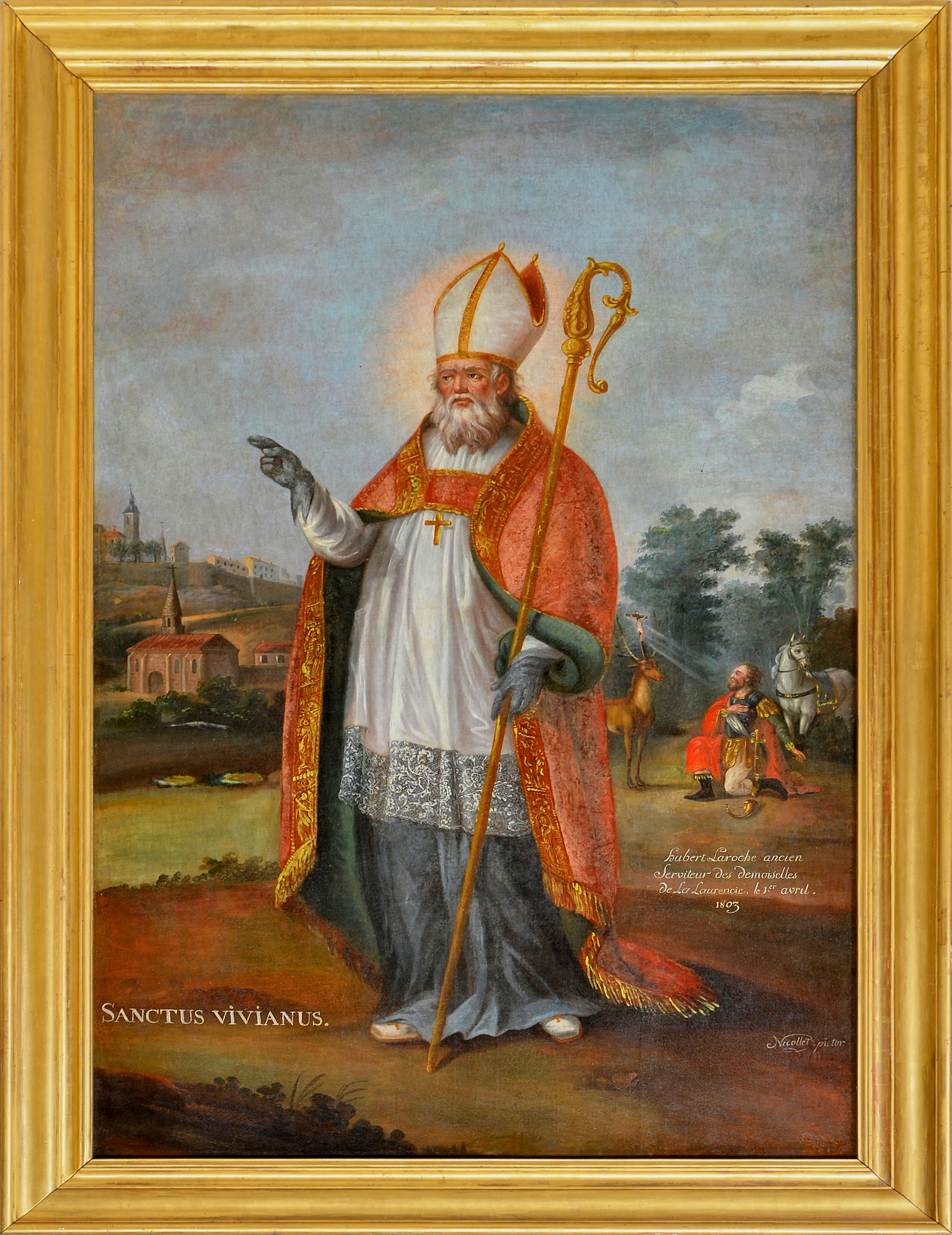

A brief Life of his dated to the mid 6th century was edited by Krush in 1896. He is also mentioned by Gregory of Tours later in the 6th century, who refers to the earlier text, saying "a book that has already been written about his life narrates the bulk of his miracles".

== Biography ==
The Latin name is Bibianus, which at one time was free of betacism—especially in County of Saintonge—suggesting that his French name may be a blend with Vivien of Sebaste. This is confirmed by the Occitan names of several places called Saint-Vivien in French, such as Saint-Vivien (Dordogne) and Paussac-et-Saint-Vivien, which are Sent Bebian or Sent Bébian, due to the shift of the stress. However, these places in the Périgord retain the distinction between and intact.

He died on August 28 around the year 460 and was later Canonization by the Church. His feast day is August 28.
