= Bibiana of Rome =

Italian Roman Catholic saint

Saint Bibiana of Rome
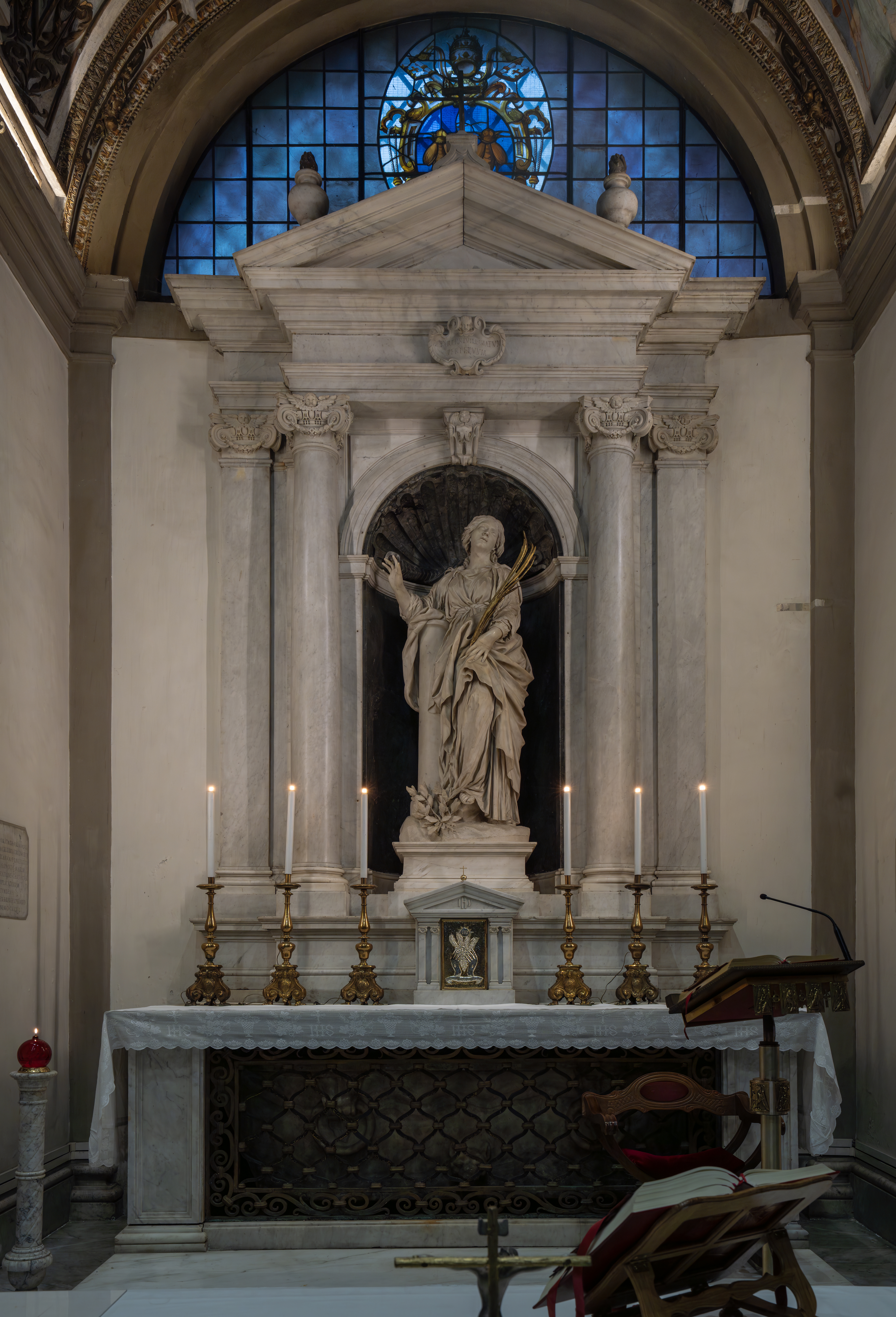
- Saint Bibiana by Gian Lorenzo Bernini, Santa Bibiana, Rome

Virgin and martyr
- Born: 4th century Rome
- Died: 360 AD; Rome
- Venerated in: Catholic Church; Eastern Orthodox Church
- Major shrine: Santa Bibiana, Rome
- Feast: 2 December
- Attributes: column and scourge with leaded thongs; branch of a tree; dagger; scourge; depicted tied to a column
- Patronage: parish, epilepsy, epileptics, hangovers, headaches, insanity, mental illness, mentally ill people, single laywomen, torture victims

Bibiana of Rome (also sometimes Bibiane, Viviana, or Vivian) is an early Christian Virgin martyr. The earliest mention in an authentic historical authority occurs in the Liber Pontificalis, where the biography of Pope Simplicius (468–483) states that this pope "consecrated a basilica of the holy martyr Bibiana, which contained her body, near the 'palatium Licinianum'" (ed. Duchesne, I, 249). The Basilica of Santa Bibiana is dedicated to her.

== Legend ==
According to legend, Bibiana was the daughter of a former prefect, Flavianus, who was banished by Julian the Apostate. His wife Dafrosa, and two daughters, Demetria and Bibiana, were also persecuted by Julian. Dafrosa and Demetria died a natural death and were buried by Bibiana in their own house; but Bibiana was tortured and died as a result of her sufferings. Two days after her death a priest named John buried Bibiana near her mother and sister in her home, the house being later transformed into a church. It is evident that the legend seeks to explain in this way the origin of the church and the presence in it of the bodies of the above-mentioned confessors. The account contained in the martyrologies of the ninth century is drawn from the legend.

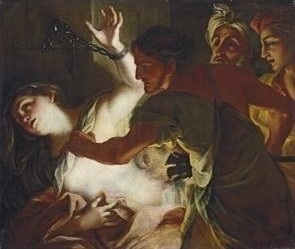
Martyrdom of Saint Bibiana by Legnanino

An alternate account says that in the year 363, Emperor Julian made Apronianus Governor of Rome. Bibiana suffered in the persecution started by him. She was the daughter of Christians, Flavian, a Roman knight, and Dafrosa, his wife. Flavian was tortured and sent into exile, where he died of his wounds. Dafrosa was beheaded, and their two daughters, Bibiana and Demetria, were stripped of their possessions and left to suffer poverty. However, they remained in their house, spending their time in fasting and prayer. Apronianus, seeing that hunger and want had no effect upon them, summoned them. Demetria, after confessing her faith, fell dead at the feet of the tyrant. Bibiana was reserved for greater sufferings. She was placed in the hands of a wicked woman called Rufina, who in vain endeavored to seduce her. She used blows as well as persuasion, but the Christian virgin remained faithful. Enraged at the constancy of this saintly virgin, Apronianus ordered her to be tied to a pillar and beaten with scourges, laden with lead plummets, until she died. The saint endured the torments with joy, and died under the blows inflicted by the hands of the executioner. Her body was then put in the open air to be torn apart by wild animals, yet none would touch it. After two days she was buried.

== Mistaken identity ==
The above-mentioned Bibiana (of the 4th century) should not be confused with Vibiana (of the 3rd century), who is the patroness of the Roman Catholic Archdiocese of Los Angeles.

== See also ==
- Santa Bibiana, the church where the body of the saint rests
- Saint Bibiana, patron saint archive
