= La Pointe du Chay =

Coordinates: 46°6′27″N 1°8′25″W

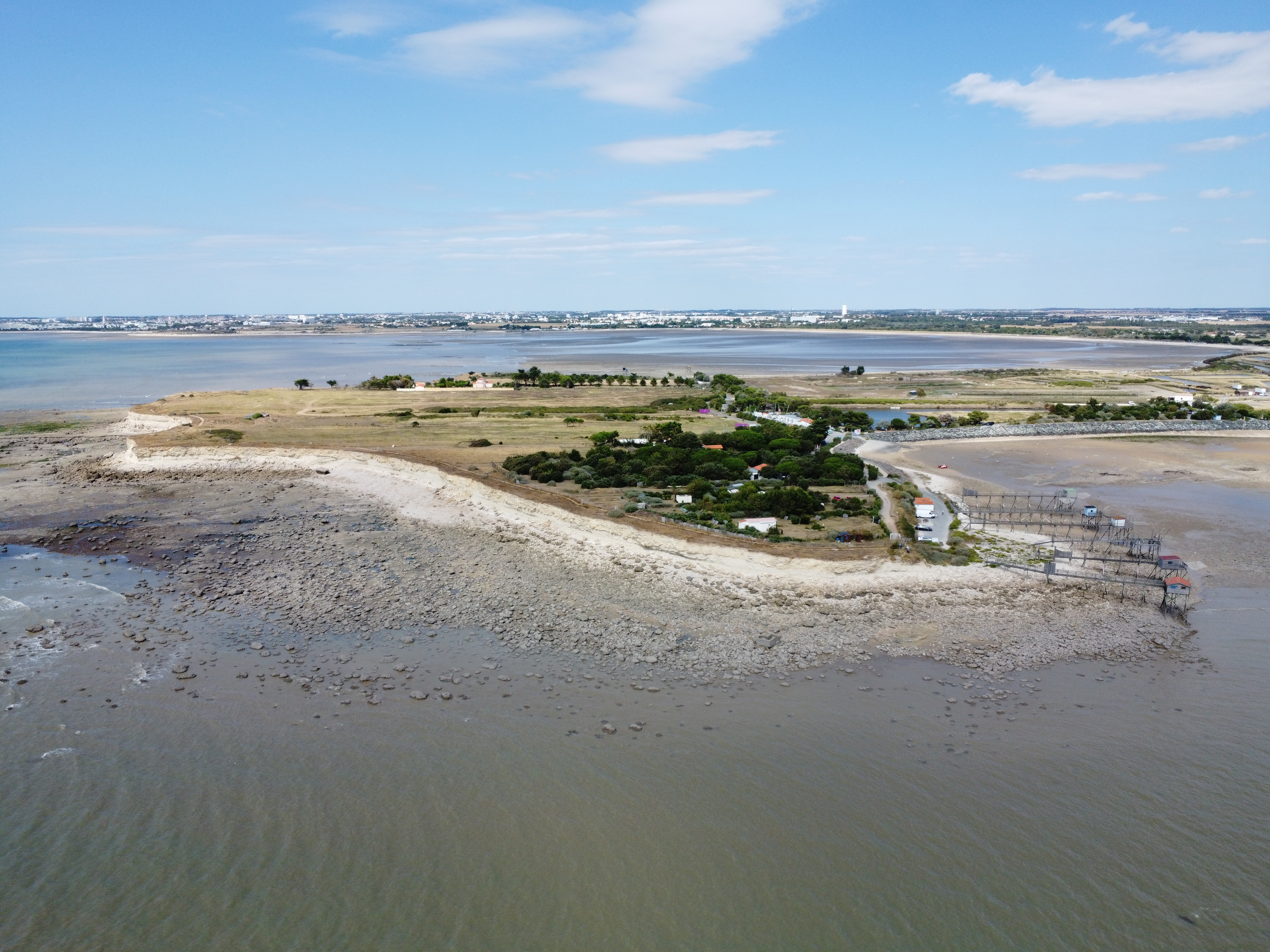
General aerial view of La Pointe du Chay.

La Pointe du Chay is a limestone promontory, about 5 kilometres from La Rochelle, France, between the seafront of Aytré and Angoulins.

La Pointe du Chay is composed of layers of limestone dating back to the Sequanian stage (upper Oxfordian stage) of the Jurassic period (circa 160 million years ago), when a large part of France was submerged. These rocks were formed by the accumulation of organisms falling on the seabed, where they solidified. This happened at the time dinosaurs were roaming the earth.

Many of these layers are especially visible and easily accessible at La Pointe du Chay, in which are encapsulated many small marine fossils. Layers of thick white rocks, formed during period of relatively warm seas, alternate with highly friable layers containing sands and remains of mud, formed during colder periods, and with layers containing various corals, that were formed during warmer, tropical times.

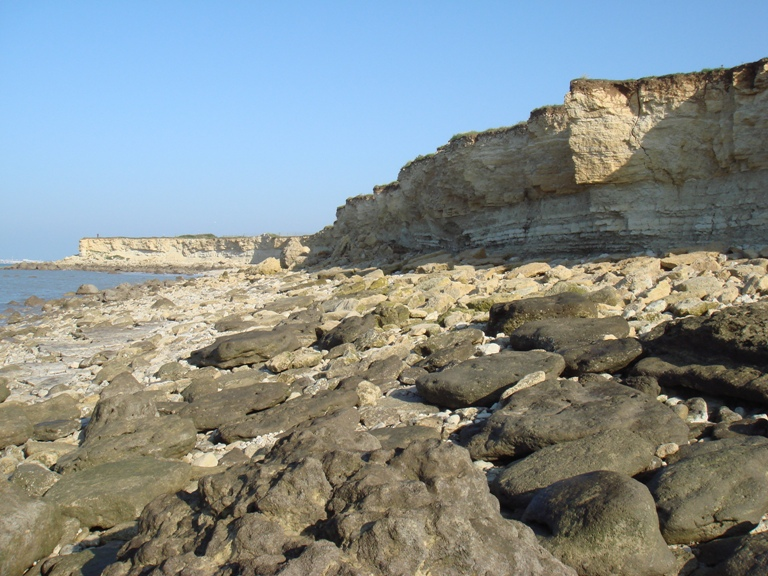
The cliffs at La Pointe du Chay.

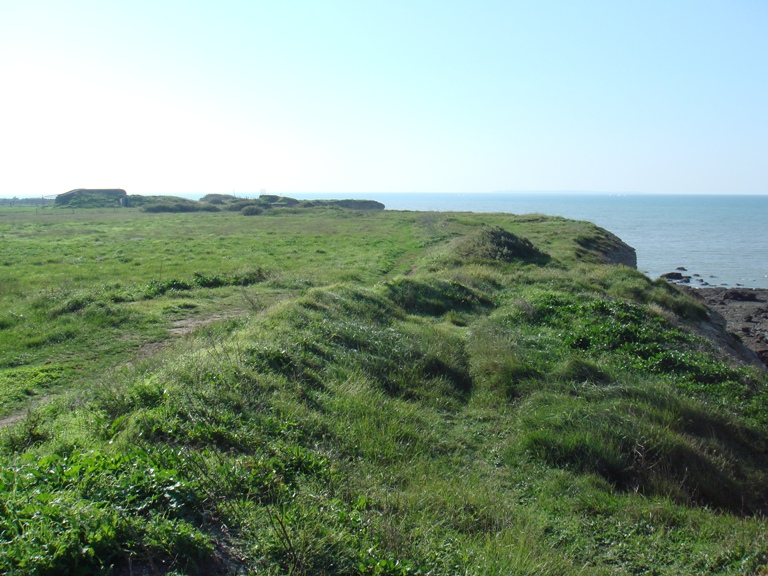
La Pointe du Chay, seen from the top, looking south. On the left are the remnants of a World War II era German bunker.

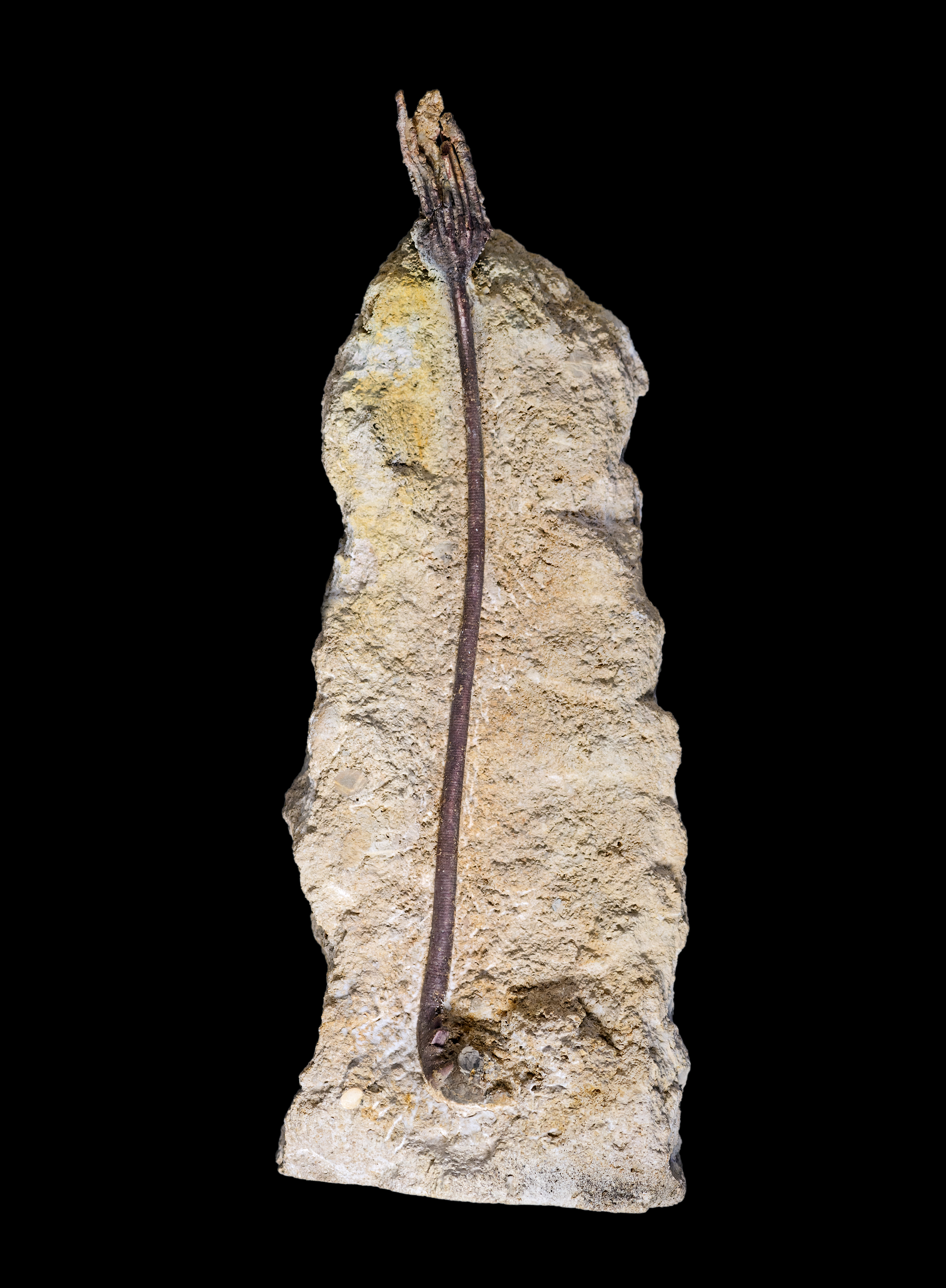
Liliocrinus polydactylus, from La Pointe du Chay.

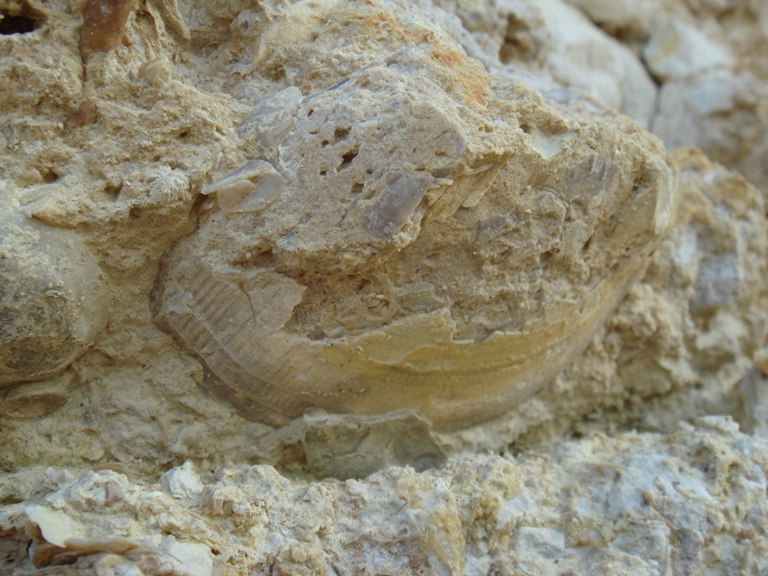
Jurassic fossil of a bivalve, from La Pointe du Chay.
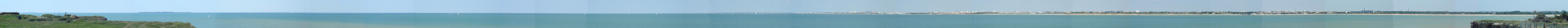
Panoramic view of the Pertuis d'Antioche from the Pointe du Chay promontory with, from left to right, Fouras, Fort Enet, Ile d'Aix, Fort Boyard, Ile d'Oléron, Île de Ré, La Rochelle, Aytré.

== Homonym ==
There is another Pointe du Chay in Royan, also in Charente-Maritime.
