= Aytré =

- Commune
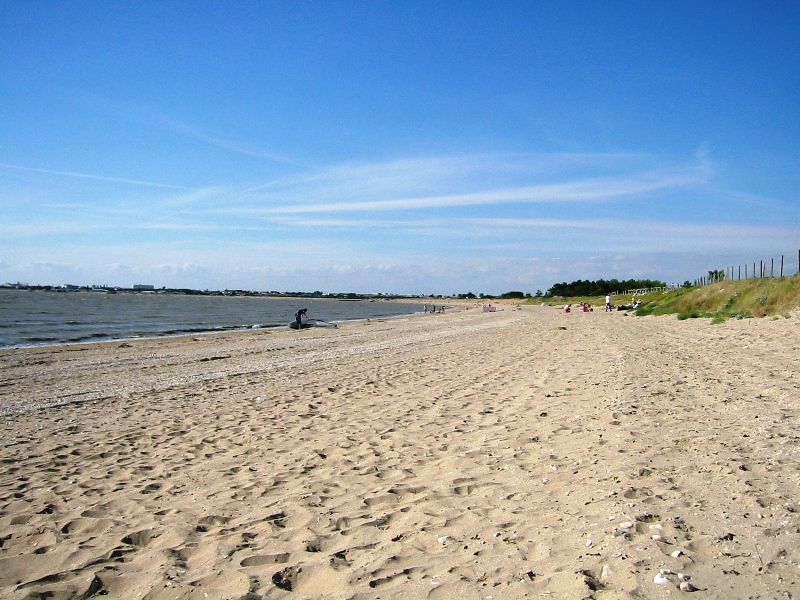
- Beach at Aytré

- Coat of arms
- Location of Aytré
- Location within France Location within Nouvelle-Aquitaine
- Coordinates: 46°08′05″N 1°06′48″W
- Country: France
- Region: Nouvelle-Aquitaine
- Department: Charente-Maritime
- Arrondissement: La Rochelle
- Canton: Aytré
- Intercommunality: CA La Rochelle

Government
  - Mayor (2020–2026): Tony Loisel
- Area^{1}: 12.22 km^{2} (4.72 sq mi)
- Highest elevation: 21 m (69 ft)
- Lowest elevation: 1 m (3.3 ft)
- Population (2023): 9,746
  - Density: 797.5/km^{2} (2,066/sq mi)
- Time zone: UTC+01:00 (CET)
  - Summer (DST): UTC+02:00 (CEST)
- INSEE/Postal code: 17028 /17440
- ^{1} French Land Register data, which excludes lakes, ponds, glaciers > 1 km^{2} (0.386 sq mi or 247 acres) and river estuaries.

Aytré (French pronunciation: [ɛtʁe]) is a commune in the Charente-Maritime department, Nouvelle-Aquitaine, southwestern France.

Aytré is especially known for its long beach, which is easily accessible from neighbouring La Rochelle, or Les Minimes. The beach is flat and shallow, making it a good bathing spot for children, and an excellent spot for windsurfing.

The historian Jean Prasteau (1921–1997) was born in Aytré, as was Jean Desaguliers, a Protestant pastor, and father of John Theophilus Desaguliers.

== Economy ==
Industries are few, and economic activity mainly gravitates around La Rochelle, with the distinct exception of Alstom Transportation. The world's fastest train, TGV, was designed right in Aytré. Oysters are cultivated in the bay and important camping grounds have been developed for tourists during the summer period.

== History ==
During the Siege of La Rochelle, Cardinal de Richelieu spent time in a farm just to the south of Aytré.

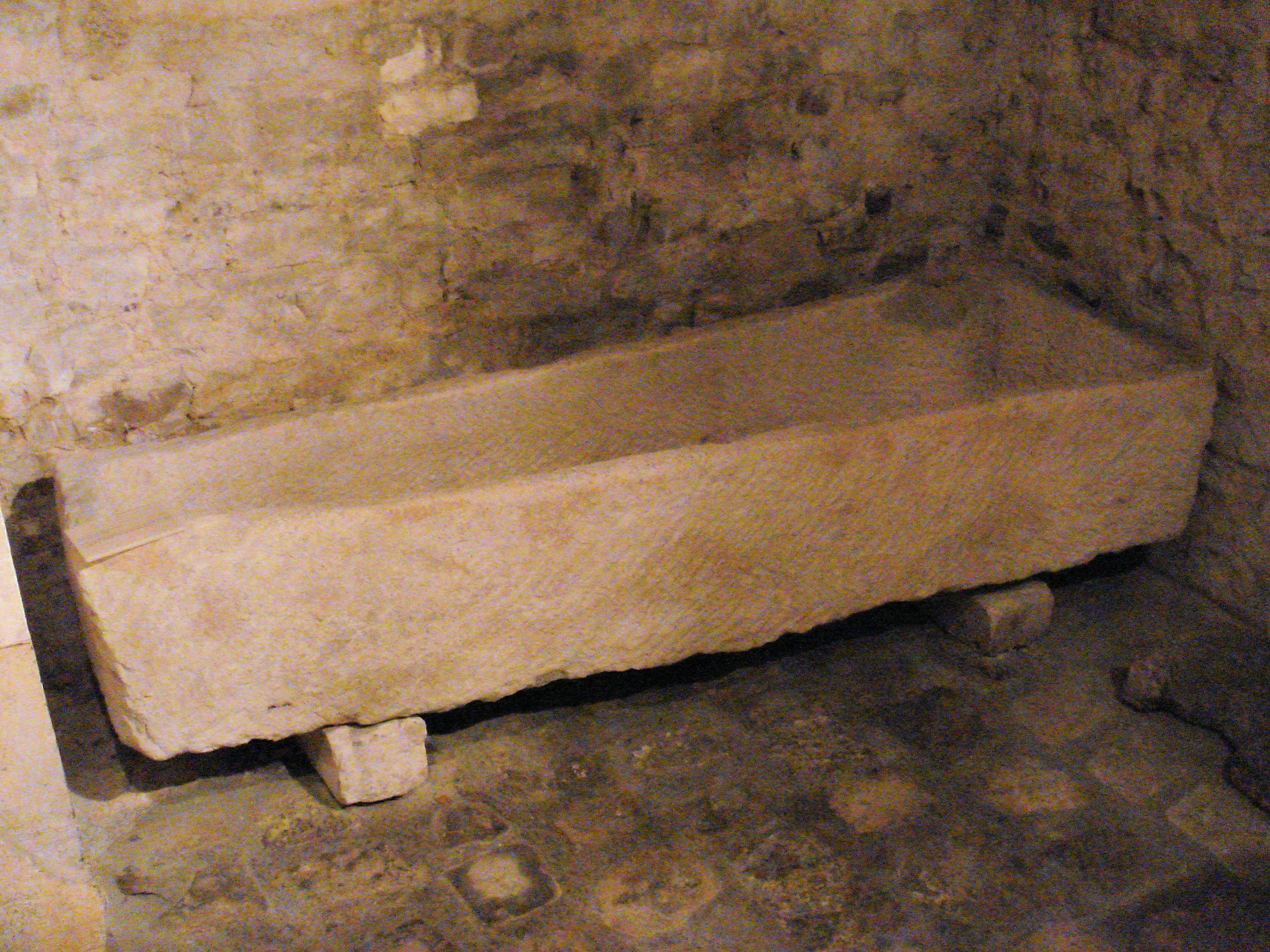
Merovingian sarcophagus from Aytré cemetery, Orbigny-Bernon Museum

== Population ==
Historical population

| Year | Pop. | ±% p.a. |
|---|---|---|
| 1793 | 1,036 | — |
| 1800 | 758 | −4.37% |
| 1806 | 1,038 | +5.38% |
| 1821 | 1,185 | +0.89% |
| 1831 | 1,320 | +1.08% |
| 1836 | 1,390 | +1.04% |
| 1841 | 1,453 | +0.89% |
| 1846 | 1,451 | −0.03% |
| 1851 | 1,463 | +0.16% |
| 1856 | 1,466 | +0.04% |
| 1861 | 858 | −10.16% |
| 1866 | 837 | −0.49% |
| 1872 | 766 | −1.47% |
| 1876 | 840 | +2.33% |
| 1881 | 923 | +1.90% |
| 1886 | 913 | −0.22% |
| 1891 | 1,019 | +2.22% |
| 1896 | 1,102 | +1.58% |
| 1901 | 1,099 | −0.05% |

| Year | Pop. | ±% p.a. |
|---|---|---|
| 1906 | 1,149 | +0.89% |
| 1911 | 1,333 | +3.02% |
| 1921 | 1,436 | +0.75% |
| 1926 | 1,645 | +2.75% |
| 1931 | 2,157 | +5.57% |
| 1936 | 2,067 | −0.85% |
| 1946 | 2,335 | +1.23% |
| 1954 | 3,021 | +3.27% |
| 1962 | 5,302 | +7.28% |
| 1968 | 6,197 | +2.63% |
| 1975 | 6,812 | +1.36% |
| 1982 | 7,278 | +0.95% |
| 1990 | 7,786 | +0.85% |
| 1999 | 7,725 | −0.09% |
| 2007 | 8,806 | +1.65% |
| 2012 | 8,948 | +0.32% |
| 2017 | 8,725 | −0.50% |
| 2023 | 9,746 | +1.86% |

Source: EHESS and INSEE (1968-2023)

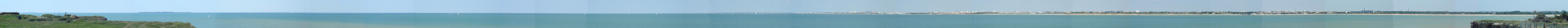
Panoramic view of the Pertuis d'Antioche from the Pointe du Chay promontory with, from left to right, Fouras, Fort Enet, Ile d'Aix, Fort Boyard, Ile d'Oléron, Île de Ré, La Rochelle, Aytré

== See also ==
- Communes of the Charente-Maritime department
