= Isembert de Châtelaillon =

French nobleman

Flag of Châtelaillon.

Isembert de Châtelaillon, or Isembard de Castrum Allionis, also Isembert the Last, also spelled Isambert, was a French nobleman and the master of the city of Châtelaillon, Charente-Maritime, a territory which covered the area between the Sèvre in the north and the Charente in the south and included Ré Island and Aix Island but not Oléron Island, in the early 12th century. Isambert, like all the Lords of Châtelaillon was a vassal of the Duke of Aquitaine and Count of Poitou. The Châtelaillon lineage is thought to have been founded by Alon, who gave his name to Castrum Alionensis (linguistically deformed into "Châtelaillon").

Isembert was a descendant of the powerful Isembert I of Châtelaillon who became prosperous through wine and salt trade, and sponsored the development of monasteries. Isembert I built the monastery of Ile d'Aix in 814, which was later invaded by the Normans and became one of their strongholds.

Isembert was also the son of Eble II of Châtelaillon, who was known for his depredation of local monasteries and was twice excommunicated as a consequence. Eble II had occupied the island of Oléron to the ire of Pope Urban II, who in 1096 threatened William IX of Aquitaine of spoliation if he did not force his vassal Eble to return the island to the monastery of the Trinity of Vendôme, headed by Abbot Geoffrey.

Isembert was vanquished by Guillaume X, Duke of Aquitaine in 1130, leading to the subsequent destruction of his harbour of Châtelaillon. This indirectly led to the emergence of La Rochelle as a substitute harbour in the Pertuis d'Antioche coastal area.
