= Fort Énet =

Island in Charente-Maritime, France

- Between the Île-d'Aix and Fouras in the Pertuis d'Antioche straits, on the west coast of France.
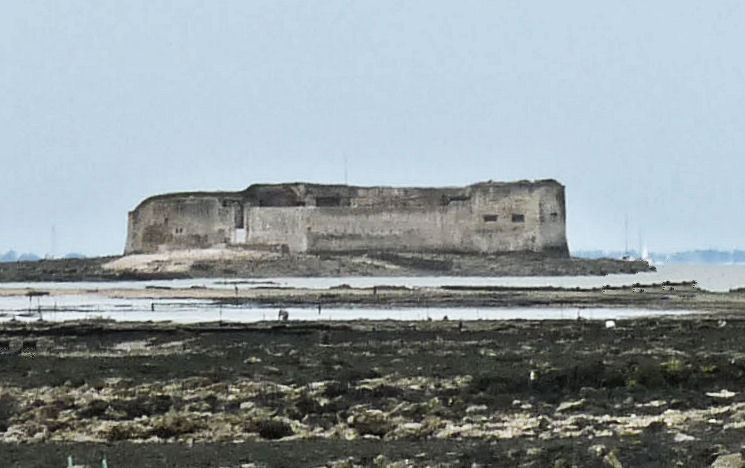
- Fort Énet at low tide.

Site information
- Type: Fortress
- Controlled by: France

Location
- Coordinates: 46.0036°N 1.1431°W

Fort Énet (French pronunciation: [fɔʁ enɛt], also spelled fort Énet in French) is a fortification in the Pertuis d'Antioche, in Charente-Maritime, Nouvelle-Aquitaine, France. It is located on the "Pointe de la Fumée", the roadway extending from the city of Fouras, between Fouras and Île-d'Aix, and can be accessed from there at low tide.

Fort Énet formed a line of fortification with Fort Boyard and Fort de la Rade on Île-d'Aix, designed to protect the arsenal of Rochefort from Royal Navy incursions. The building of the fort was started in 1810 by Napoleon I, following the devastating 1809 Battle of the Basque Roads.

The Fort can be reached on foot at low tide, and can be visited.

Fort Enet is listed as a Monument Historique. It is indexed in the Base Mérimée, a database of the French architectural patrimony maintained by the French Ministry of Culture, under the reference PA00132807.

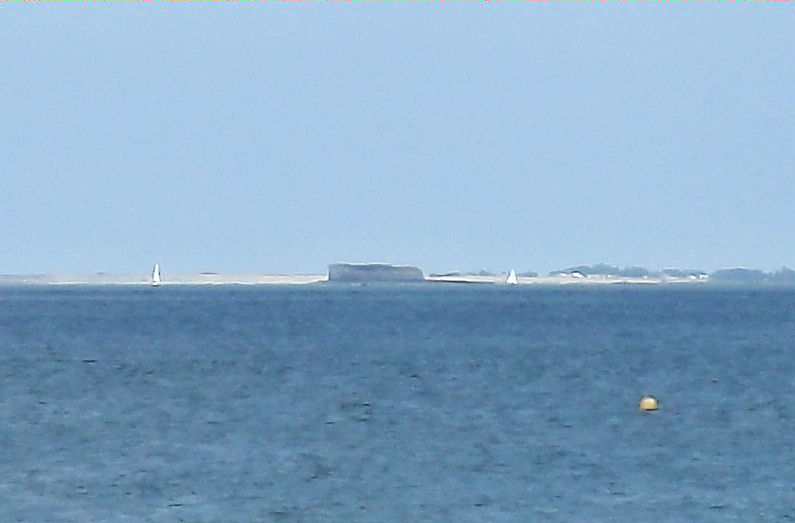
Fort Énet from the Island of Oléron.

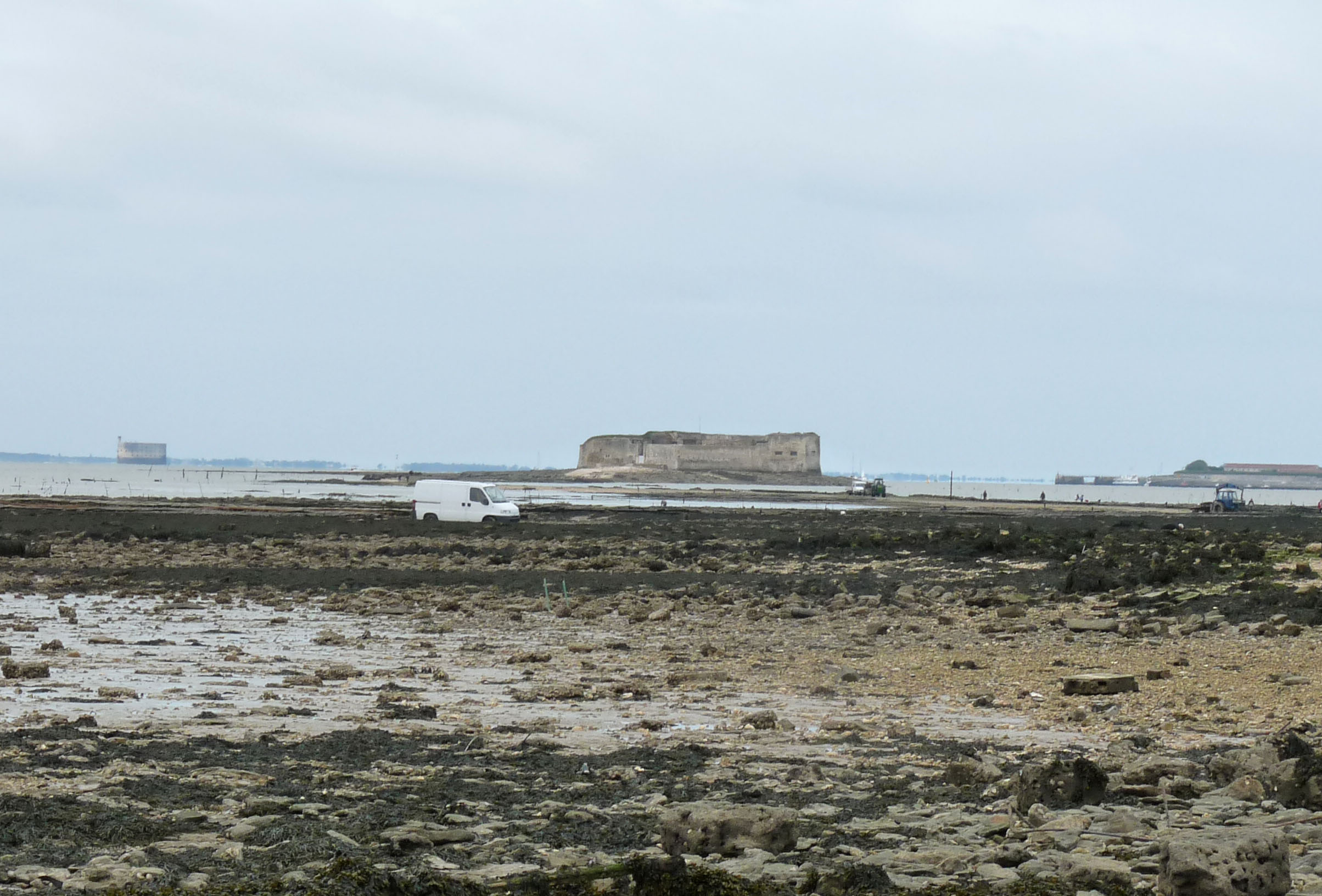
Fort Enet at low tide, with Fort Boyard (left) and Fort de la Rade on Île-d'Aix (right) in the background.

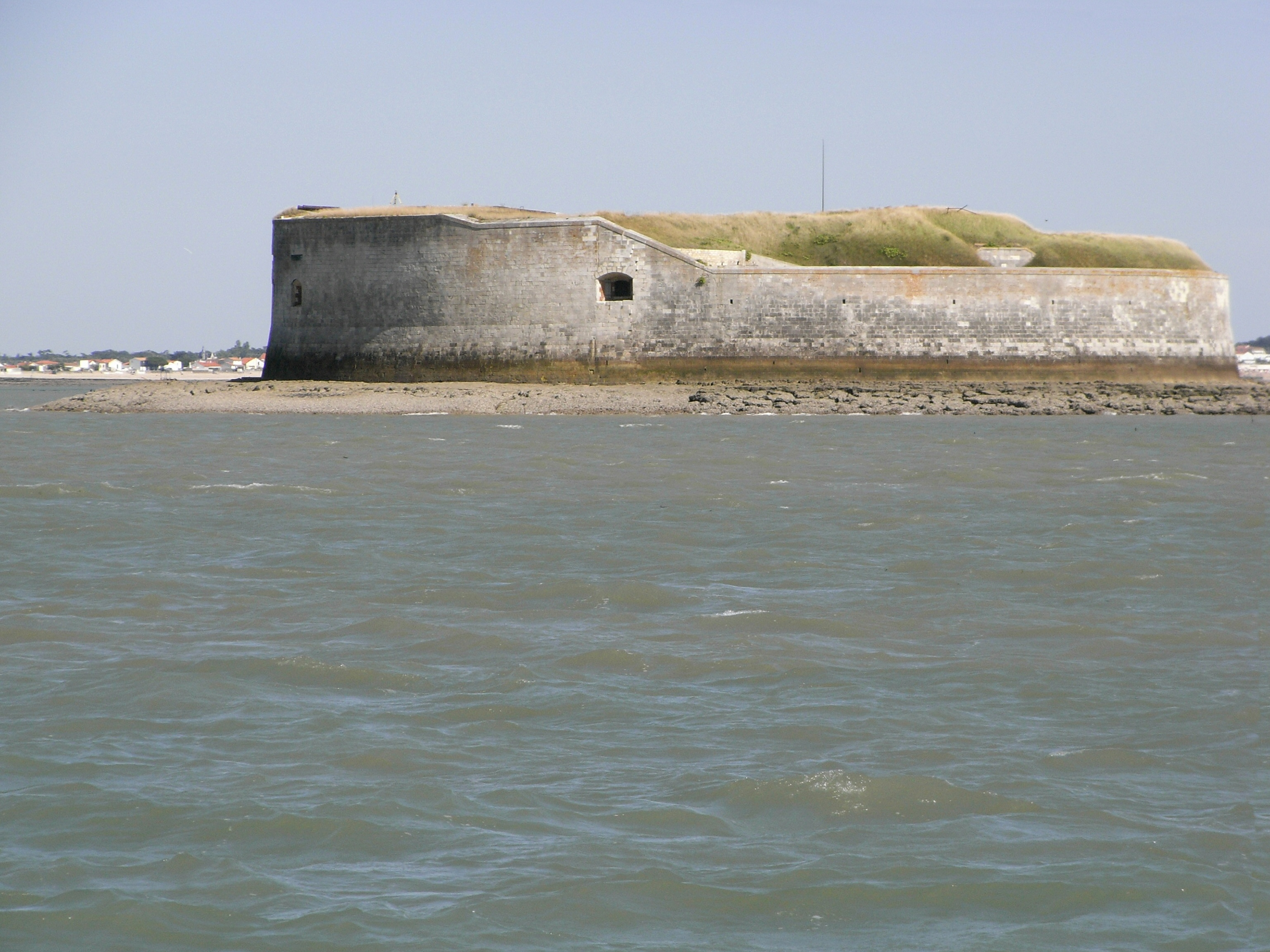
Fort Enet from the bay of Île-d'Aix.

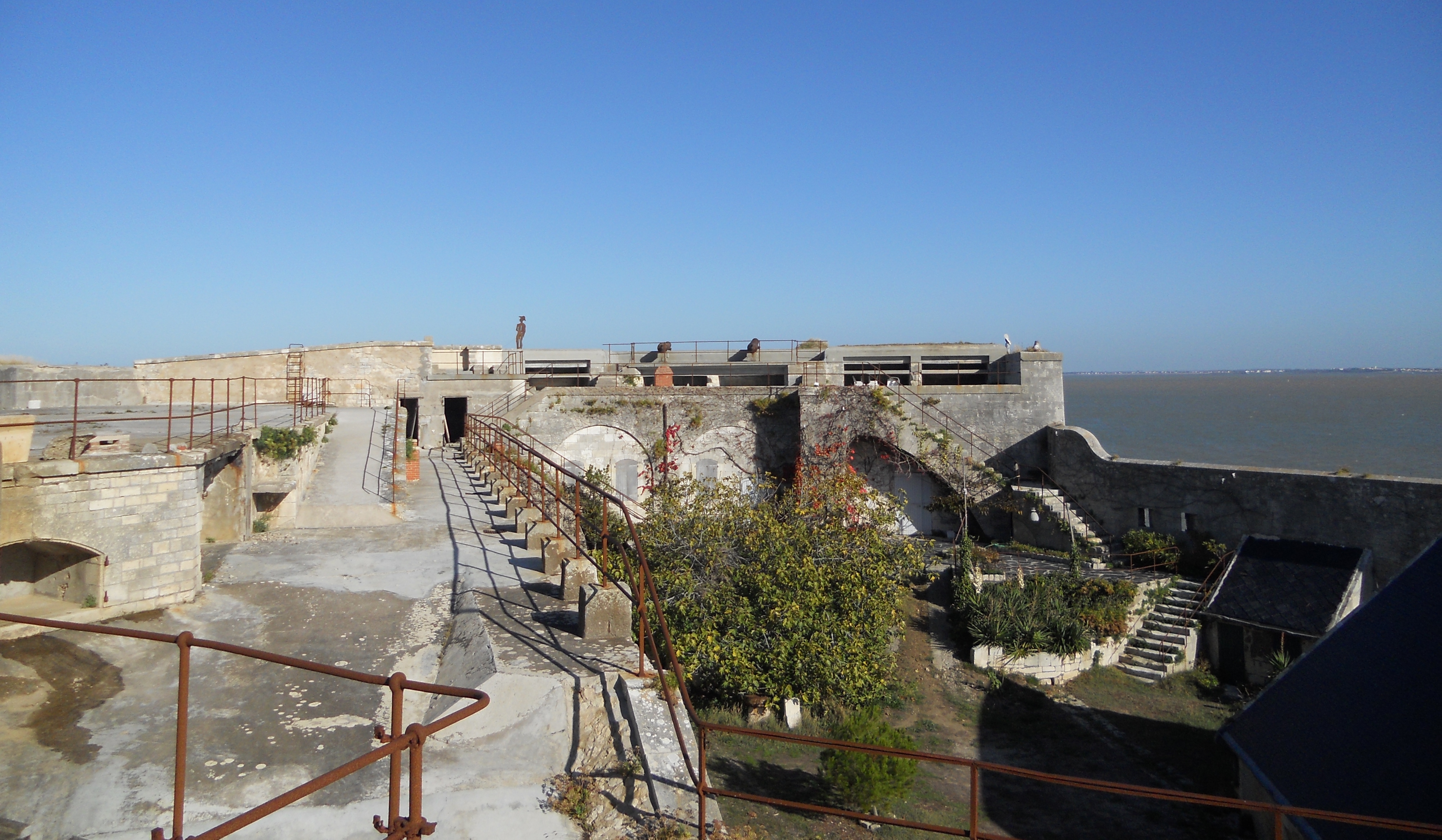
Internal structure of Fort Énet.

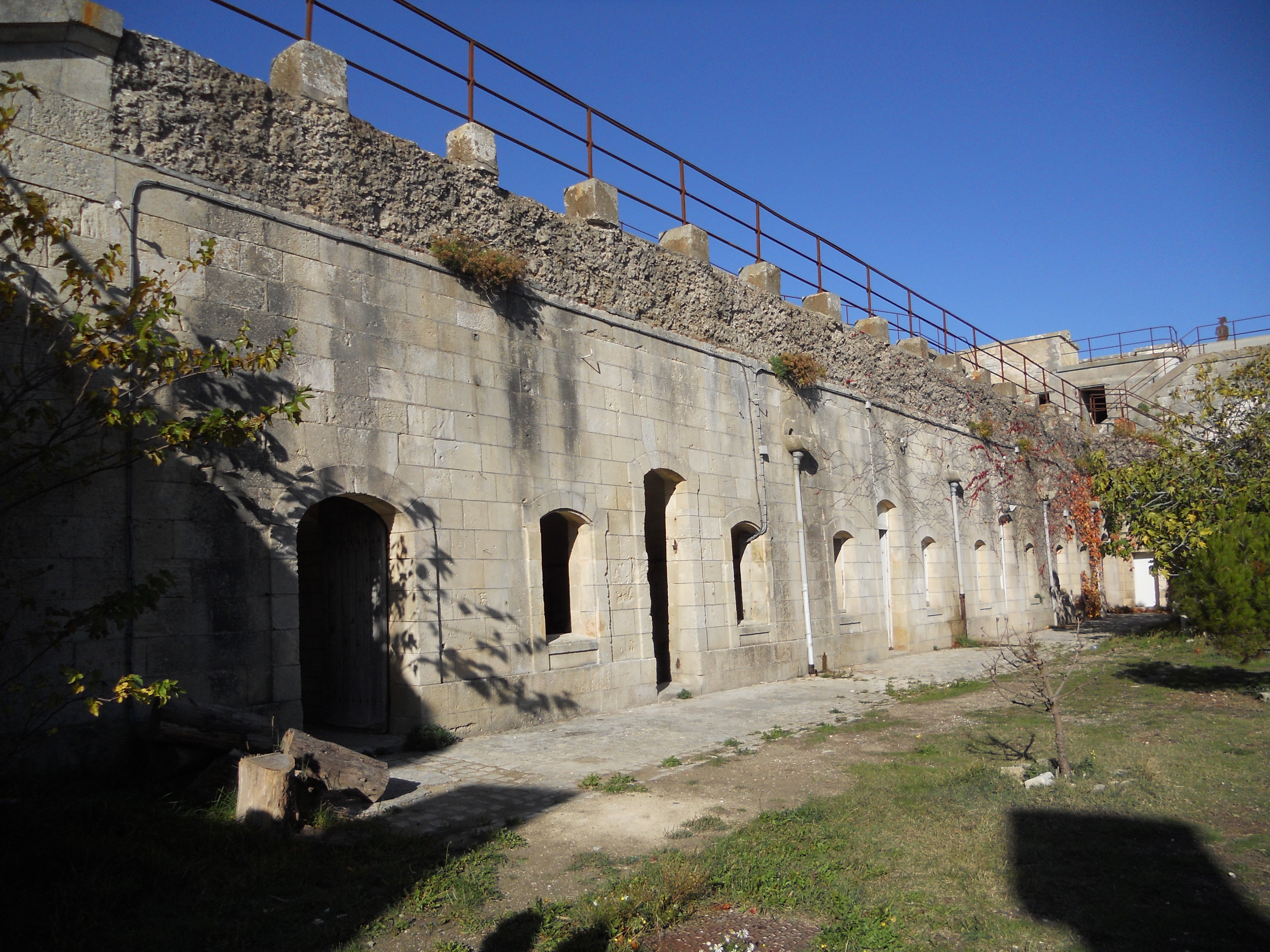
Inside Fort Énet.

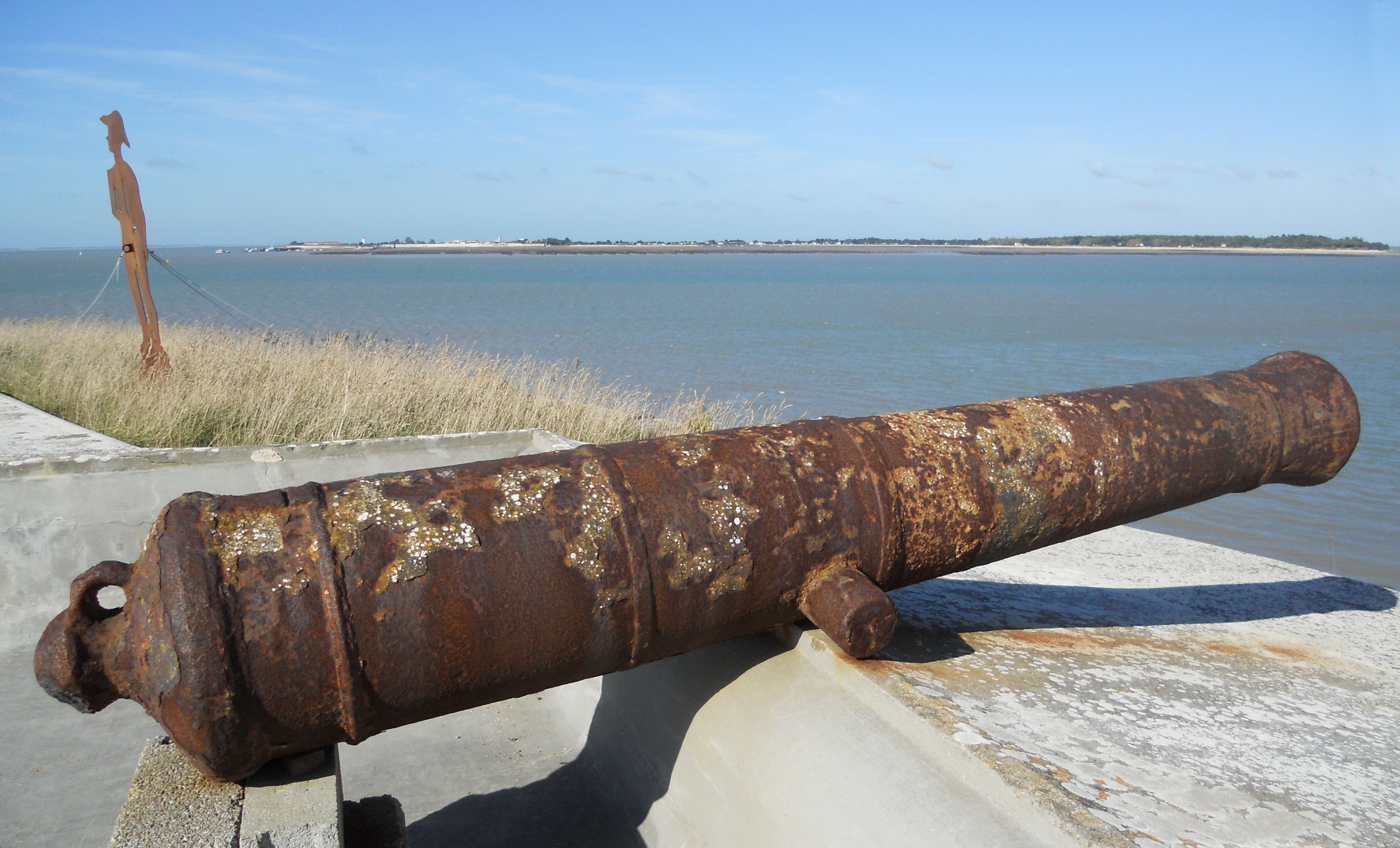
Fort Enet gun, with Île-d'Aix in the background.

== Notes ==
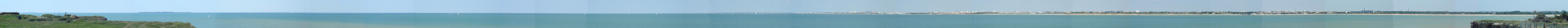
Panoramic view of the Pertuis d'Antioche from the Pointe du Chay promontory with, from left to right, Fouras, Fort Enet, Ile d'Aix, Fort Boyard, Ile d'Oléron, Île de Ré, La Rochelle, Aytré.
