= Charles-Amable Lenoir =

French painter

- Born: Charles Aimable Lenoire; 22 October 1860; Châtelaillon, Charente-Maritime, France
- Died: 1 August 1926 (aged 65); Paris, France
- Education: William-Adolphe Bouguereau, Tony Robert-Fleury
- Known for: Painter
- Movement: Realism

Charles-Amable Lenoir (22 October 1860 – 1926) was a French painter. Like his mentor, William-Adolphe Bouguereau, he was an academic painter and painted realistic portraits as well as mythological and religious scenes. His artistic career was so prestigious that he won the Prix de Rome twice and was awarded the Légion d'honneur.

== Biography ==
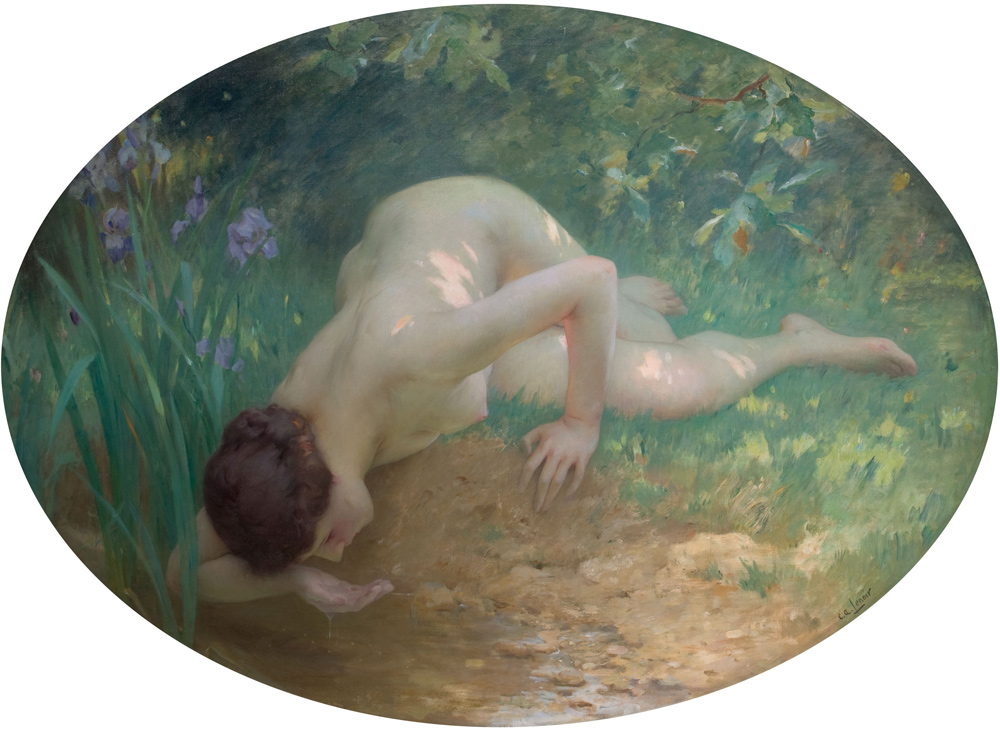
La Baigneuse

Lenoir was born in Châtellaillon, a small town just outside La Rochelle. His mother was a seamstress and his father was a customs officer. When he was young, his father was reassigned and the family moved to Fouras. He did not start out in life as an artist, but instead began his education at a teachers' college in La Rochelle. Upon graduation, he worked as a teacher and supervisor at the lycée in Rochefort.

In August 1883 he was accepted into the École des Beaux-Arts de Paris. He also joined the Académie Julian where he was a student of William-Adolphe Bouguereau and Tony Robert-Fleury. Lenoir made his artistic debut at the Salon in 1887 and continued to exhibit there until his death. He was quickly noticed in the art world, and in 1889 won the Second Prix de Rome for his painting, Jésus et le paralytique (Jesus and a Sick Man with Palsy), and he won the First Prix de Rome the following year for Le Reniement de Saint Pierre (The Denial of St. Peter).

His awards did not stop with the Prix de Rome; works shown at the Salons also won prizes, and he received a third-class medal in 1892 for Le Grenier a Vingt Ans (The Garret at twenty years) and a second-class medal in 1896 for La Mort de Sappho (The Death of Sappho). In 1900, he won a bronze medal at the world's fair in Paris for Le Calme (The Calm), a painting of his new wife, Eugénie Lucchesi.

In tribute to his lasting appeal, Lenoir was appointed a Chevalier de la Légion d'honneur in 1903. He kept a house in Fouras and returned every summer. He died there and was buried on 1 August 1926. In order to commemorate him, a monument was erected there in 1937 which stands to this day. (Note: 1926 is usually given as the year of his death, although it is not certain. Bibliothèque nationale de France and Agence Photographique Réunion des Musées Nationaux refrain from giving a date. Sotheby's and Christie's give 1940.)

Charles-Amable Lenoir's paintings

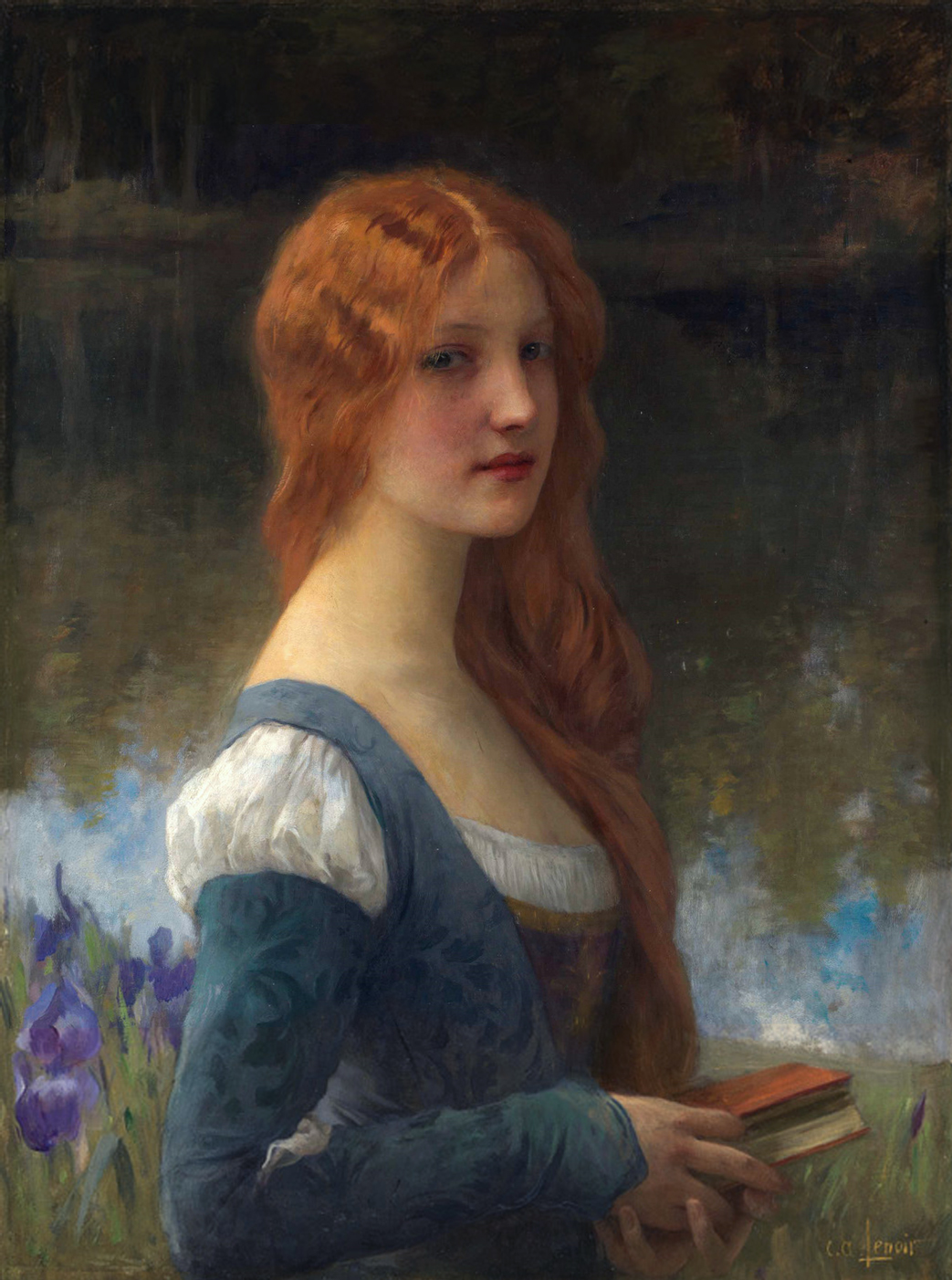
A la Recherche du Temps Perdu

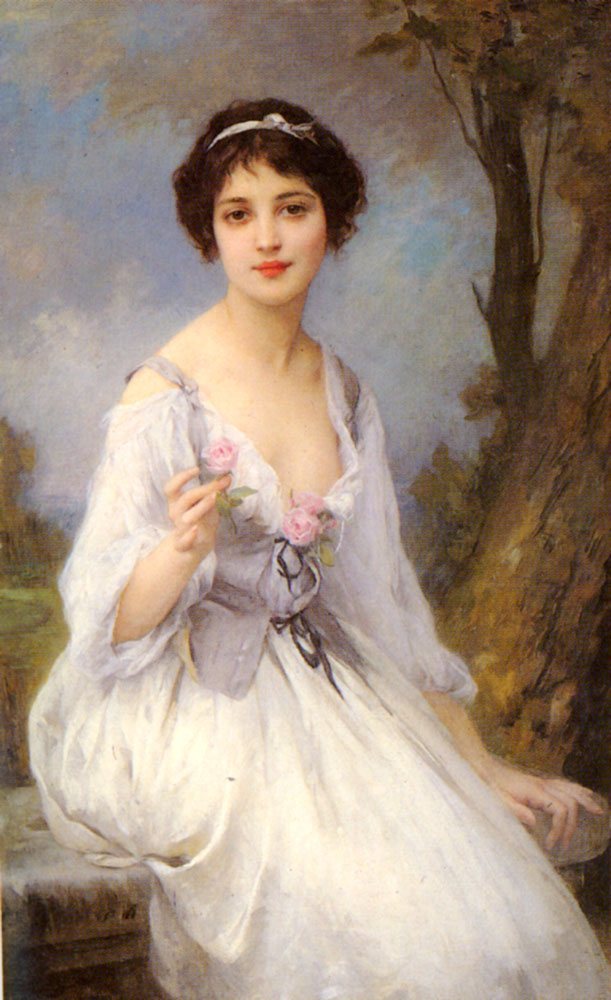
The Pink Rose

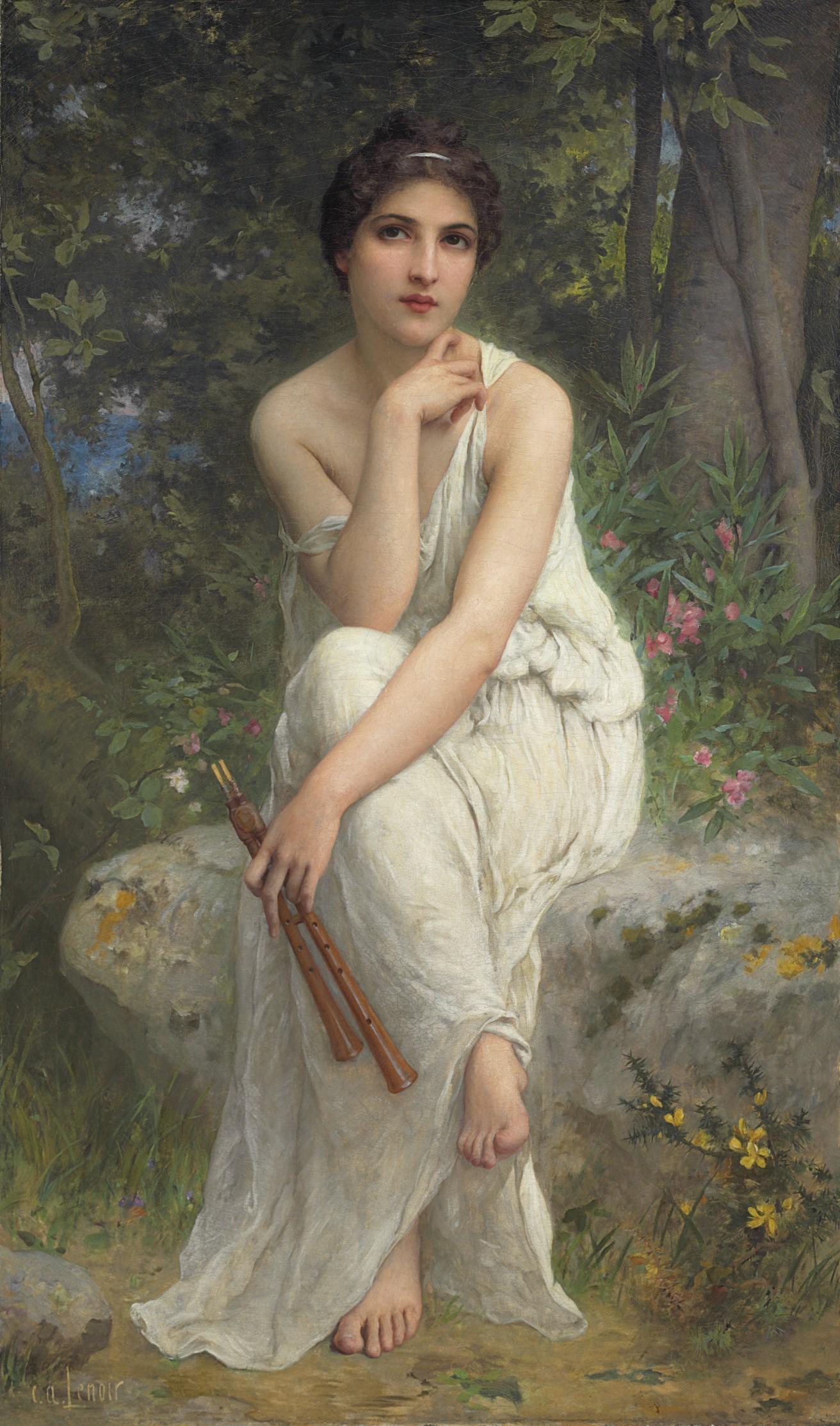
The Flute Player

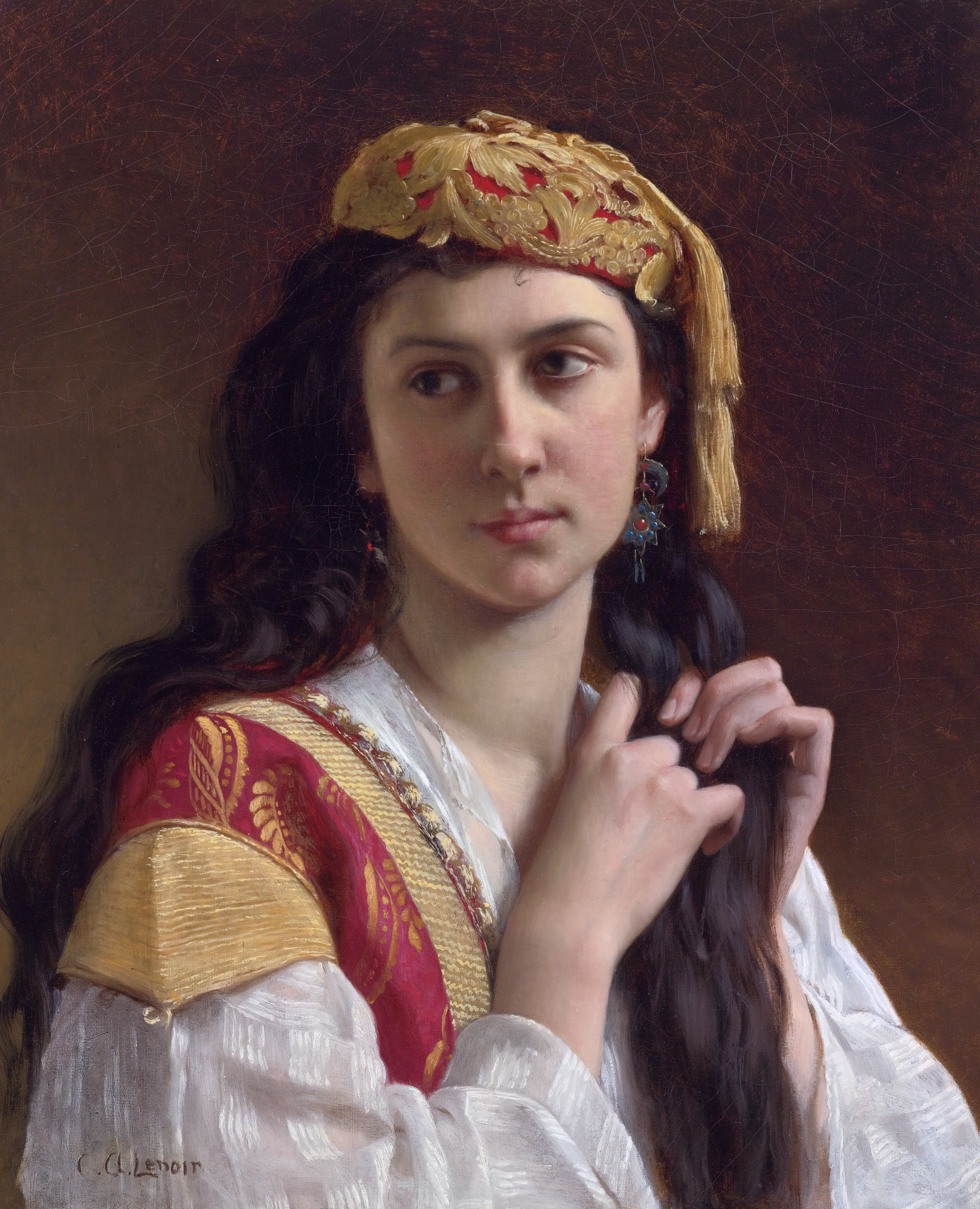
Day Dreams

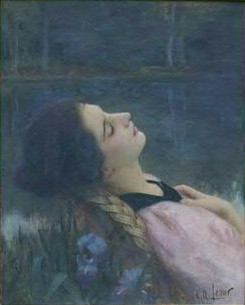
Lenoir's award-winning Le Calme, which he painted using his 21-year-old wife as a model.

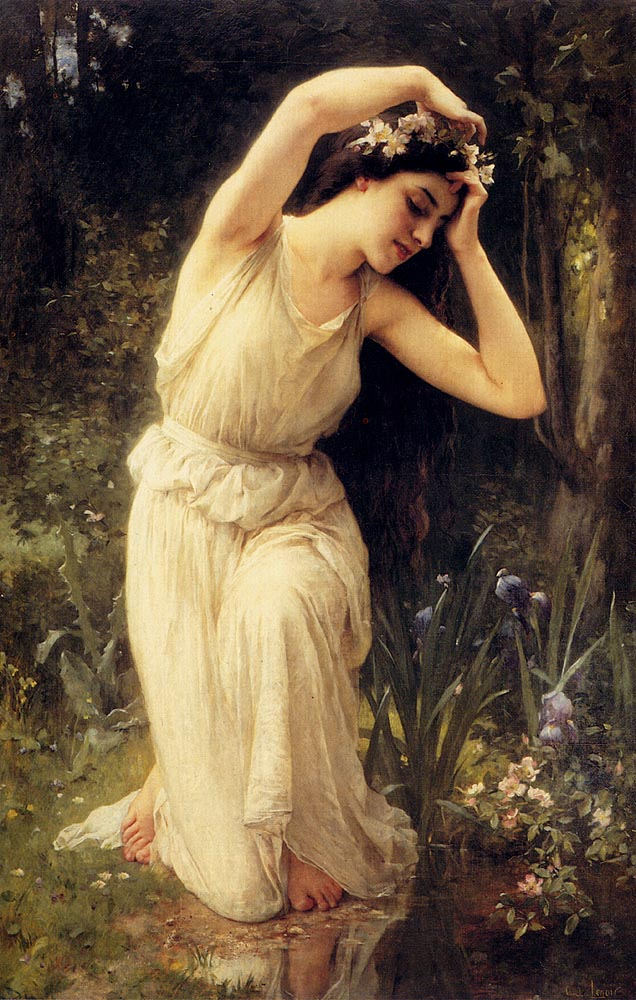
A Nymph In The Forest

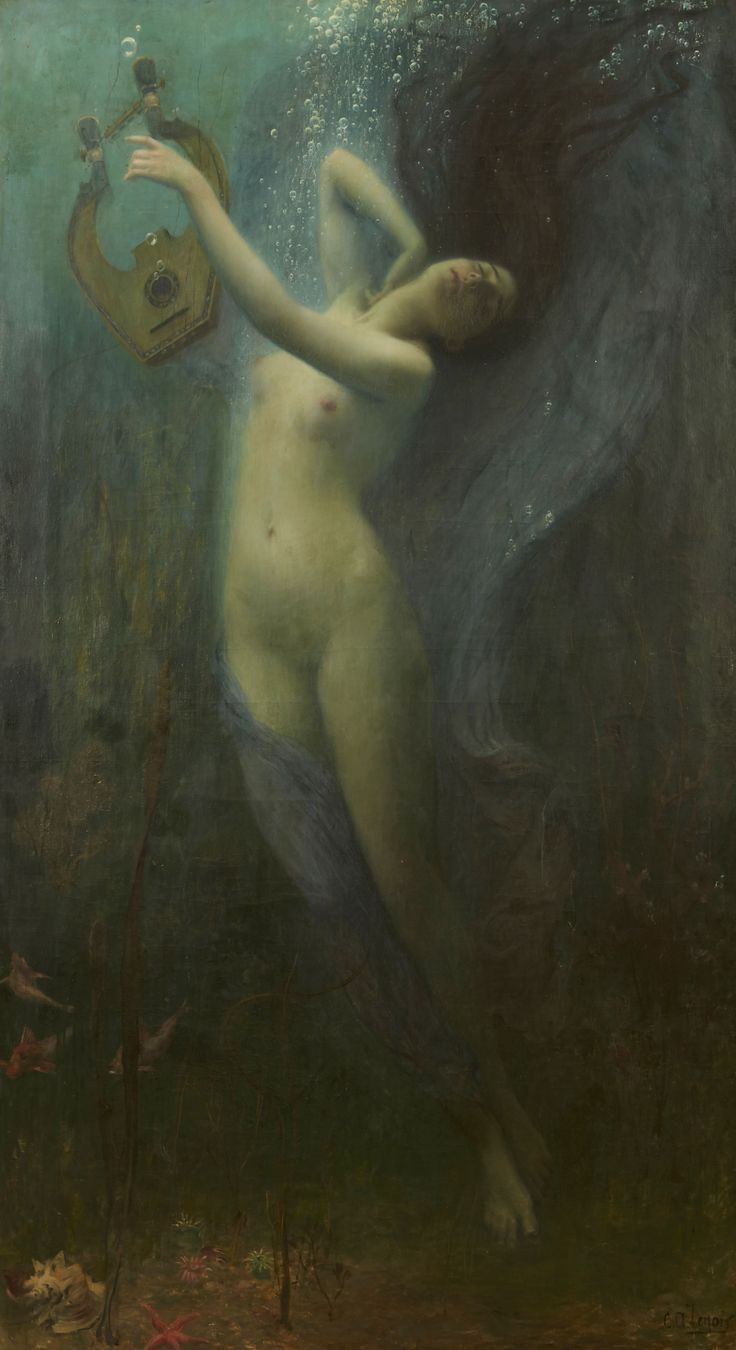
La Mort de Sapho

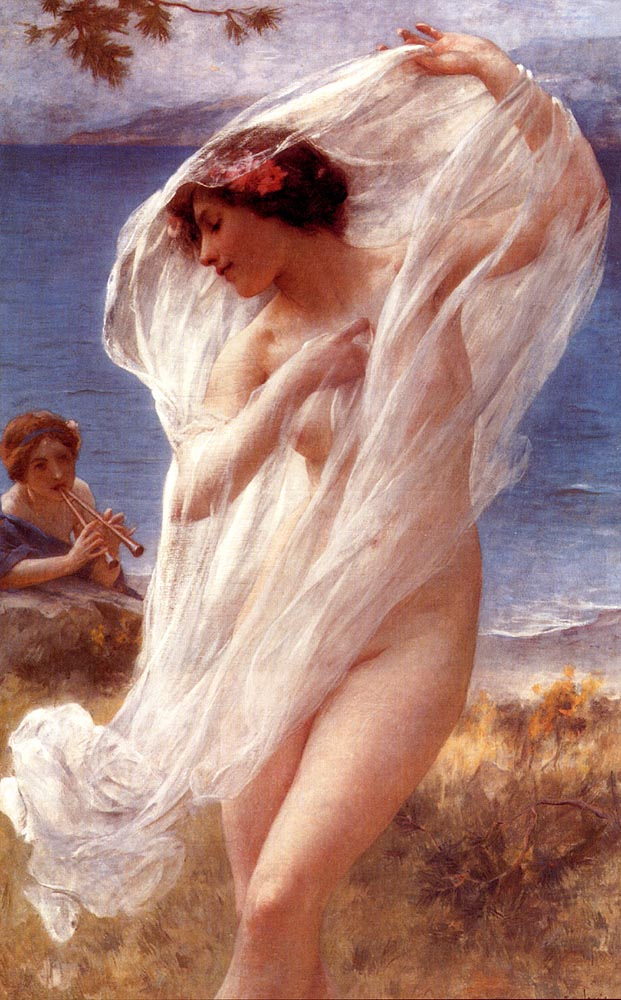
A Dance By The Sea

== See also ==
- List of Orientalist artists
- Orientalism
