= Pertuis d'Antioche =

Coordinates: 46.11323°N 1.43646°W

The Pertuis d'Antioche (French pronunciation: [pɛʁtɥi d‿ɑ̃tjɔʃ], Passage of Antioch) is a strait on the Atlantic coast of Western France between two islands; Île de Ré to the north, and Oléron to the south. To the east lies the continental coast between the cities of La Rochelle and the naval arsenal of Rochefort; to the west the open ocean. The channel is above a league in breadth, and at the northern point of Oleron lies a ledge of rocks called the Antioches, with which the channel shares its name. The ledge extends a quarter league wide of the coast of Oleron, obliging traffic to follow the middle of the channel. The position of the ledge, and the entrance to the channel, was in past times marked with a lighthouse. The link with Antioch, a city in Turkey, is unclear.

== History ==
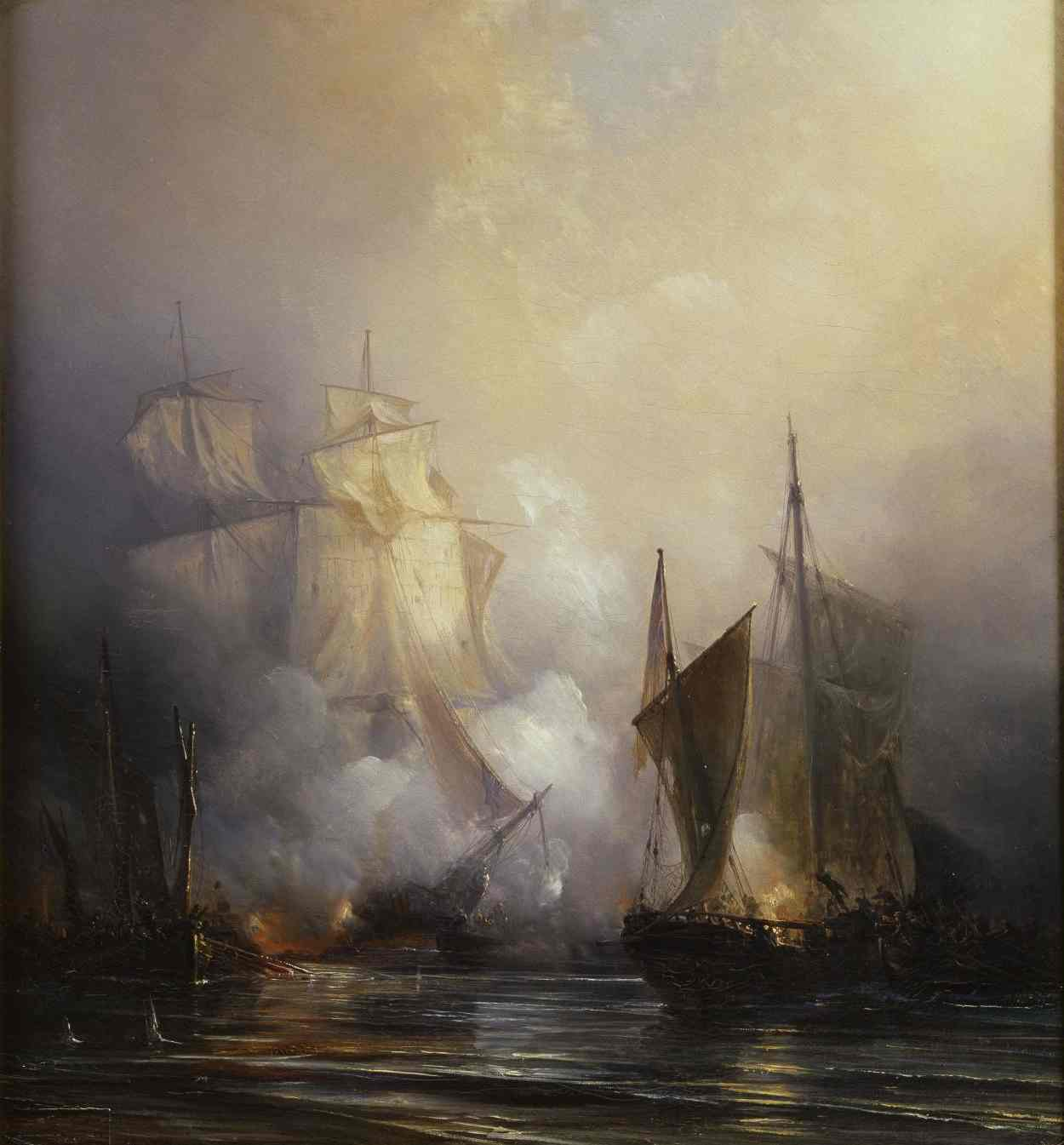
1848 painting of Poursuivante engaging British ships in the Pertuis d'Antioche in 1804 by Théodore Gudin

The Pertuis d'Antioche was already active during Roman times, when it saw trade in salt and wine centred on Saintes. Much later, the military rivalry between England and France resulted in the Pertuis being the site of frequent naval engagements.

In the Middle Ages, the area was contested between England and France as part of the Hundred Years' War. Louis XIV of France made the city of Rochefort one of the great naval bases of his kingdom. He then had fortresses constructed to protect the Rochefort roadstead. During the Napoleonic Wars, the French further fortified the area, most notably with the construction of Fort Boyard. After his defeat at Waterloo, Napoleon tried to flee to the United States from the Pertuis d'Antioche, but eventually surrendered to the Royal Navy, which was blockading the area; he was later sent into exile on the island of Saint Helena.

Lastly, during World War II, the Germans occupied the coast and fortified it against invasion. They also built a large submarine base in La Rochelle; this still stands today, and was used as a set for the historical submarine movie Das Boot. Even after the Allied invasion of France, La Rochelle remained a pocket of German resistance that surrendered only at the end of the war.

== List of fortifications ==
For various political and strategic reasons, since at least the 17th Century the Pertuis d'Antioche has been a frequent site of naval conflicts. Many coastal defenses were built within the straight, including fortresses, artillery batteries, and bunkers. Fortifications on the Pertuis d'Antioche include:

- Fort Louvois
- Fort Boyard
- Fort Liédot
- Fort Enet
- Fort de l'Aiguille
- Fort Vauban de Fouras
- Fort Lapointe
- Fort de l'Ile Madame
- Base sous-marine de La Rochelle (Submarine pen at La Pallice port in La Rochelle)

== Geography ==
The Pertuis d'Antioche is bordered by a limestone coast dating back to the Cretaceous, at which time it was deep under water. The weather is oceanic. Although at the same latitude as Montreal, Canada and the Kuril Islands, Russia, the area is quite warm throughout the year, due to the influence of the Gulf Stream waters, and the number of sunny days per year, which is remarkably high, on a par with the French Riviera on the Mediterranean coast of France. With its warm, protected waters, the Pertuis d'Antioche has become one of the most active tourist and pleasure-boat centres in Europe, with the La Rochelle marina complex at its centre.

== Gallery ==
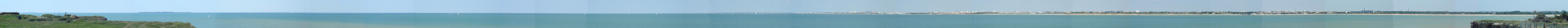
Panoramic view of the Pertuis d'Antioche from the Pointe du Chay promontory with, from left to right, Fouras, Fort Enet, Île d'Aix, Fort Boyard, Île d'Oléron, Île de Ré, La Rochelle, Aytré.
