= Châtelaillon-Plage =

- Commune
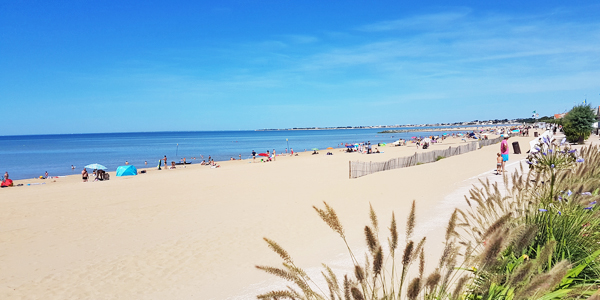
- The beach in Châtelaillon

- Flag Coat of arms
- Location of Châtelaillon-Plage
- Location within France Location within Nouvelle-Aquitaine
- Coordinates: 46°04′27″N 1°05′12″W
- Country: France
- Region: Nouvelle-Aquitaine
- Department: Charente-Maritime
- Arrondissement: La Rochelle
- Canton: Châtelaillon-Plage
- Intercommunality: CA La Rochelle

Government
  - Mayor (2020–2026): Stéphane Villain
- Area^{1}: 6.59 km^{2} (2.54 sq mi)
- Elevation: 3 m (9.8 ft)
- Highest elevation: 21 m (69 ft)
- Lowest elevation: 0 m (0 ft)
- Population (2023): 6,653
  - Density: 1,010/km^{2} (2,610/sq mi)
- Demonym: Châtelaillonnais.e (French)
- Time zone: UTC+01:00 (CET)
  - Summer (DST): UTC+02:00 (CEST)
- INSEE/Postal code: 17094 /17340
- ^{1} French Land Register data, which excludes lakes, ponds, glaciers > 1 km^{2} (0.386 sq mi or 247 acres) and river estuaries.

Châtelaillon-Plage (French pronunciation: [ʃatɛlajɔ̃ plaʒ], also [ʃɑtɛlajɔ̃]), commonly known as Châtelaillon, is a commune in the Charente-Maritime department, administrative region of Nouvelle-Aquitaine, France.

It is located south of the city of La Rochelle and is also a suburb. It is twinned with Knebworth, England.

== History ==
In the 16th century near the point of Cornard today featured a fortress known as Castrum Allionis, the old capital of Aunis. On August 1130, the Duke of Aquitaine William X of Poitiers, besieged the château. The leader of the place Isembert deprived its troops. The rest of the fortress were totally despaired in the 16th century, a small hamlet with bells of the swamps. During the 19th century, it had agricultural area in Boucholeurs. At the end of the nineteenth century, it was linked with rail, it constructed its first baths bains de mar with numerous villas.

Today, the location of the mediaeval château is uncertain, it may also located by the Turge.

== Education ==
- École maternelle et élementaire Pierre Jonchery (Pierre Jonchery Maternal and Elementary School)
- École maternelle Les Sables
- École élémentaire Paul Michaud (Paul Michaud Elementary School)
- Collège André Malraux
- CIPECMA (Centre Interconsulaire de Perfectionnement et d'Enseignement de la Charente-Maritime).

== Twin towns ==
Châtelaillon is twinned with Knebworth, Hertfordshire, England, Evolène, Wallis, Switzerland, and Skierniewice, Łódź, Poland.

== Population ==
Historical population
| Year | Pop. | ±% p.a. |
|---|---|---|
| 1968 | 5,377 | — |
| 1975 | 5,354 | −0.06% |
| 1982 | 5,439 | +0.23% |
| 1990 | 4,993 | −1.06% |
| 1999 | 5,625 | +1.33% |
| 2007 | 5,959 | +0.72% |
| 2012 | 5,937 | −0.07% |
| 2017 | 5,846 | −0.31% |
| 2023 | 6,653 | +2.18% |
Source: INSEE

== See also ==
- Communes of the Charente-Maritime department
