= Fouras =

- Commune
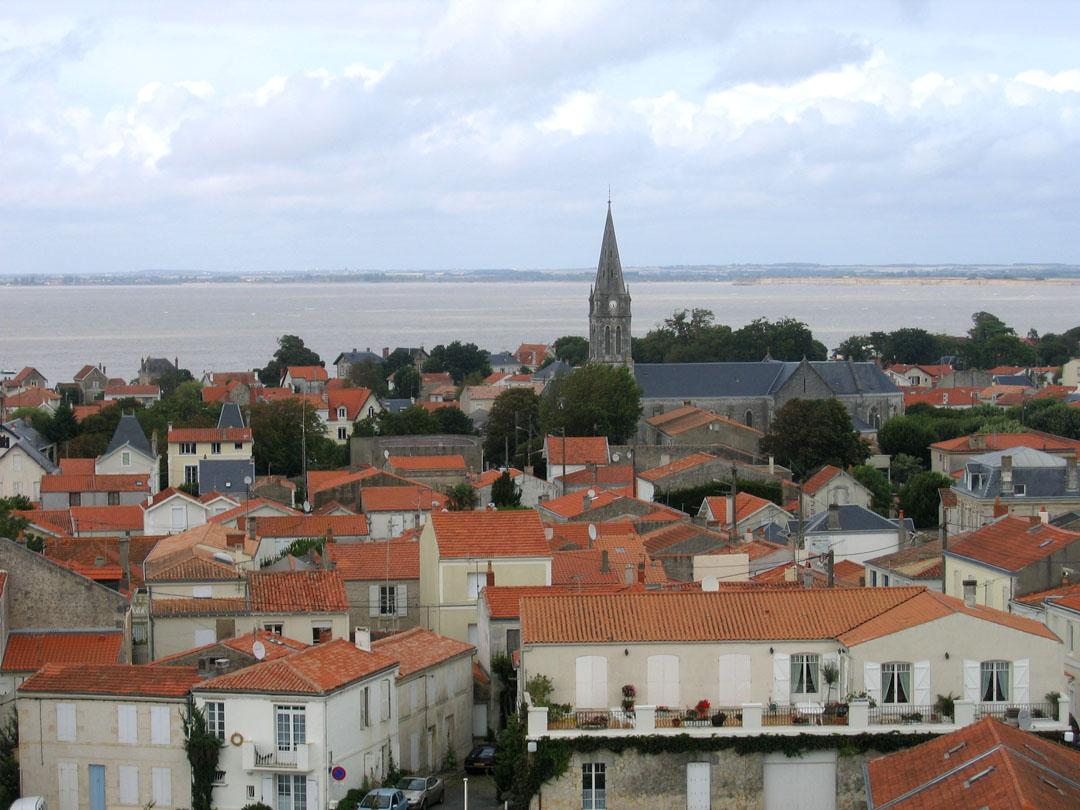
- A general view of Fouras

- Coat of arms
- Location of Fouras
- Location within France Location within Nouvelle-Aquitaine
- Coordinates: 45°59′16″N 1°05′35″W
- Country: France
- Region: Nouvelle-Aquitaine
- Department: Charente-Maritime
- Arrondissement: Rochefort
- Canton: Châtelaillon-Plage
- Intercommunality: CA Rochefort Océan

Government
  - Mayor (2021–2026): Daniel Coirier
- Area^{1}: 9.51 km^{2} (3.67 sq mi)
- Highest elevation: 21 m (69 ft)
- Lowest elevation: 0 m (0 ft)
- Population (2023): 4,148
  - Density: 436/km^{2} (1,130/sq mi)
- Demonym: Fourasin·e (Note: Demonym pronunciation: [fuʁazɛ̃], [fuʁazin])
- Time zone: UTC+01:00 (CET)
  - Summer (DST): UTC+02:00 (CEST)
- INSEE/Postal code: 17168 /17450
- ^{1} French Land Register data, which excludes lakes, ponds, glaciers > 1 km^{2} (0.386 sq mi or 247 acres) and river estuaries.

Fouras, also known as Fouras-les-Bains (French pronunciation: [fuʁa le bɛ̃]), is a commune in the French department of Charente-Maritime, administrative region of Nouvelle-Aquitaine (before 2015: Poitou-Charentes). It lies 34 km south of La Rochelle.

== Geography ==
Fouras is on a peninsula. It is bordered by five beaches and a forest named "Bois Vert" ("Green Wood" in English) which covers 20% of its surface area.

There is a causeway linking Fouras to Fort Énet, which is walkable at low tide, in the direction of Île-d'Aix. The pier for the island of Aix is also located in the territory of the commune.

The south coast of the peninsula of Fouras forms the northern side of the mouth of the river Charente. A little further south is the Île d'Oléron. Off the island between Aix and the Oleron Island is Fort Boyard, which was made famous by the French and U.K. TV game shows of the same name and whose character "Père Fouras" ([pɛʁ fuʁa], also incorrectly pronounced [pɛʁ fuʁas]) increased the celebrity of the town.

== Population ==
Historical population

Year	Pop.	±% p.a.
1793	615	—
1800	638	+0.53%
1806	645	+0.18%
1821	736	+0.88%
1831	860	+1.57%
1836	843	−0.40%
1841	800	−1.04%
1846	833	+0.81%
1851	823	−0.24%
1856	870	+1.12%
1861	926	+1.26%
1866	1,028	+2.11%
1872	1,138	+1.71%
1876	1,256	+2.50%
1881	1,679	+5.98%
1886	1,877	+2.25%
1891	1,887	+0.11%
1896	1,989	+1.06%
1901	2,171	+1.77%

Year	Pop.	±% p.a.
1906	2,461	+2.54%
1911	2,499	+0.31%
1921	2,399	−0.41%
1926	2,322	−0.65%
1931	2,166	−1.38%
1936	2,474	+2.69%
1946	3,013	+1.99%
1954	4,068	+3.82%
1962	4,121	+0.16%
1968	3,634	−2.07%
1975	3,612	−0.09%
1982	3,295	−1.30%
1990	3,238	−0.22%
1999	3,835	+1.90%
2007	4,056	+0.70%
2012	4,083	+0.13%
2017	4,006	−0.38%
2023	4,148	+0.58%

Source: EHESS and INSEE (1968-2023)

== Vauban Fortress ==
The "Vauban Fortress" (French: fort Vauban, [fɔʁ vobɑ̃]) was initially a strategic fortification established by Philip the Fair, circa 1300. The donjon was rebuilt in 1480-1490 by Jehan II de Brosse. In 1689, Ferry reinforced the walls of the Donjon to set up a battery of 9 canons and a signaling point. In 1693 a lower circular battery was set up to control access to the river Charente. The donjon received a signal station from 1889 to World War II.

== Gallery ==
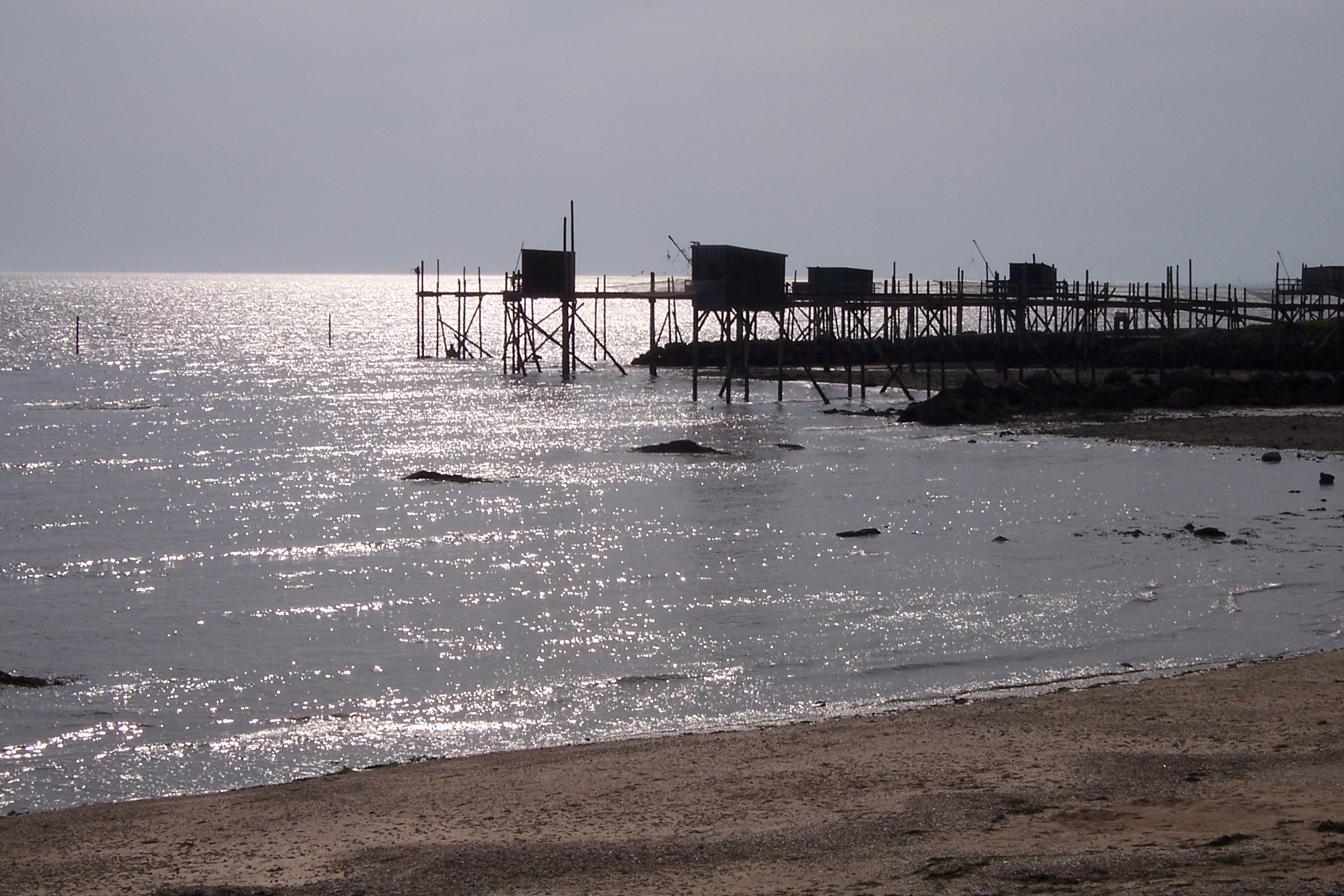
Fisherman's Cabin

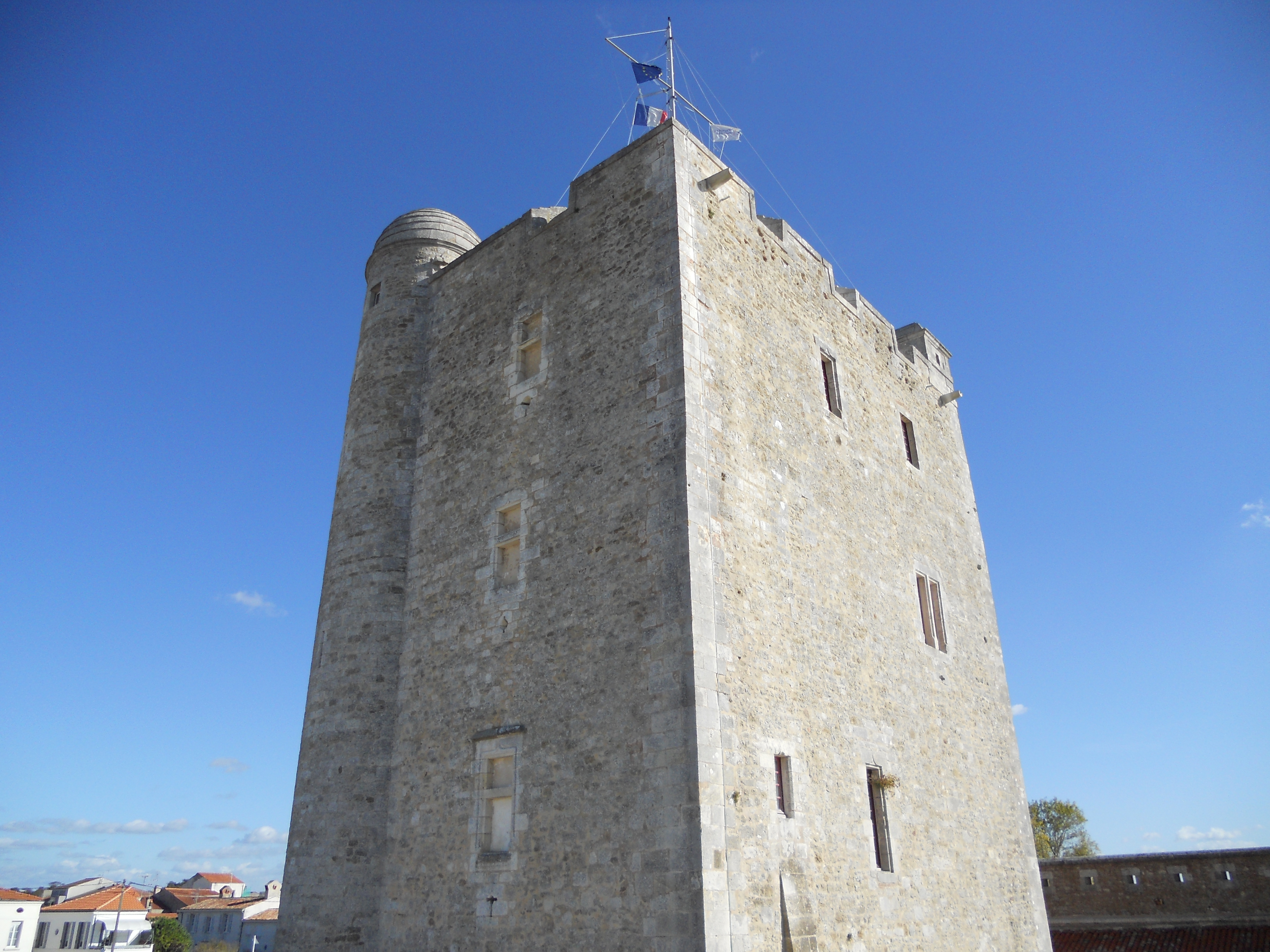
Fouras donjon in the "Vauban Fortress".

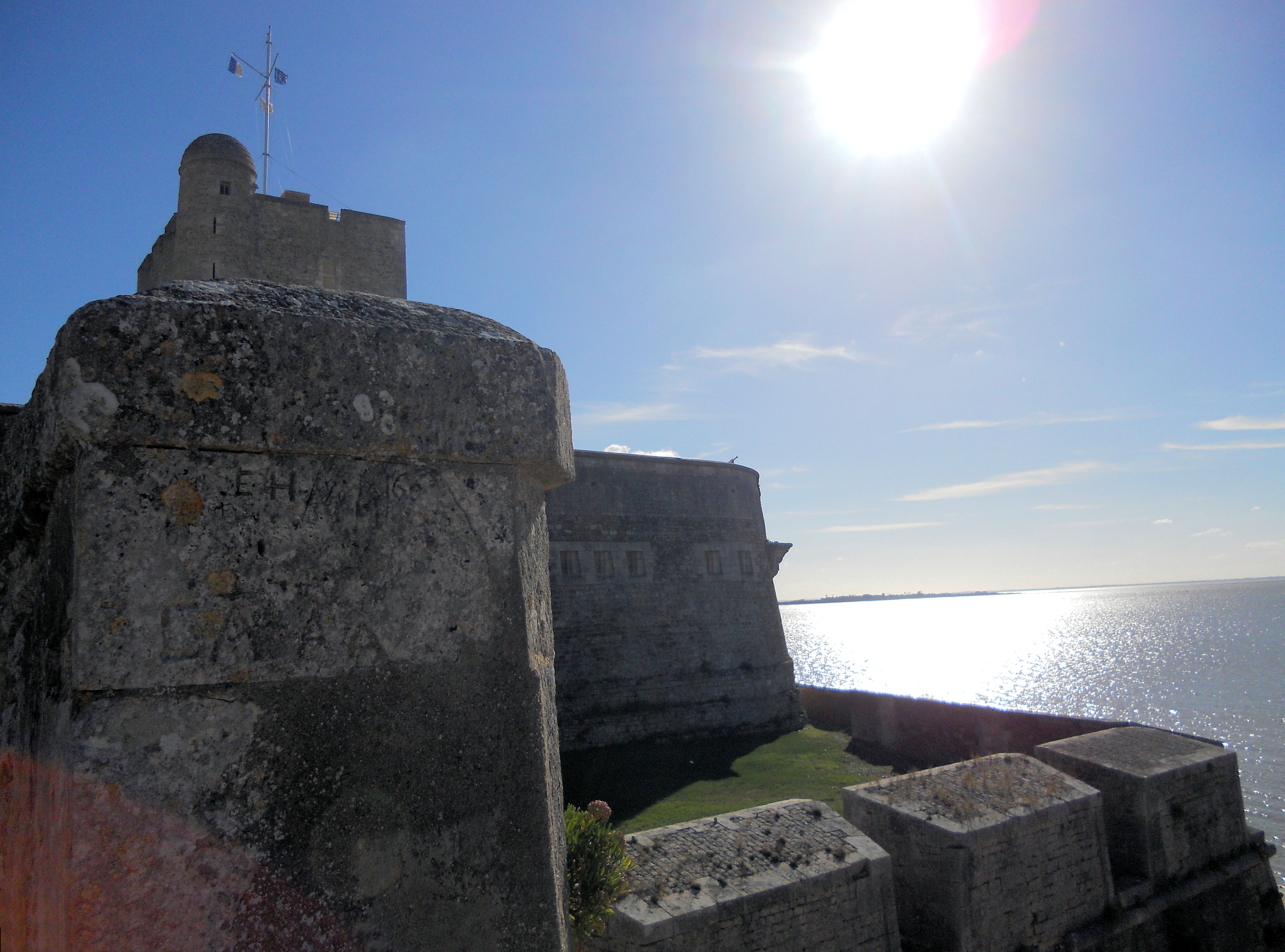
The "Vauban Fortress" (Fort Vauban) in Fouras.

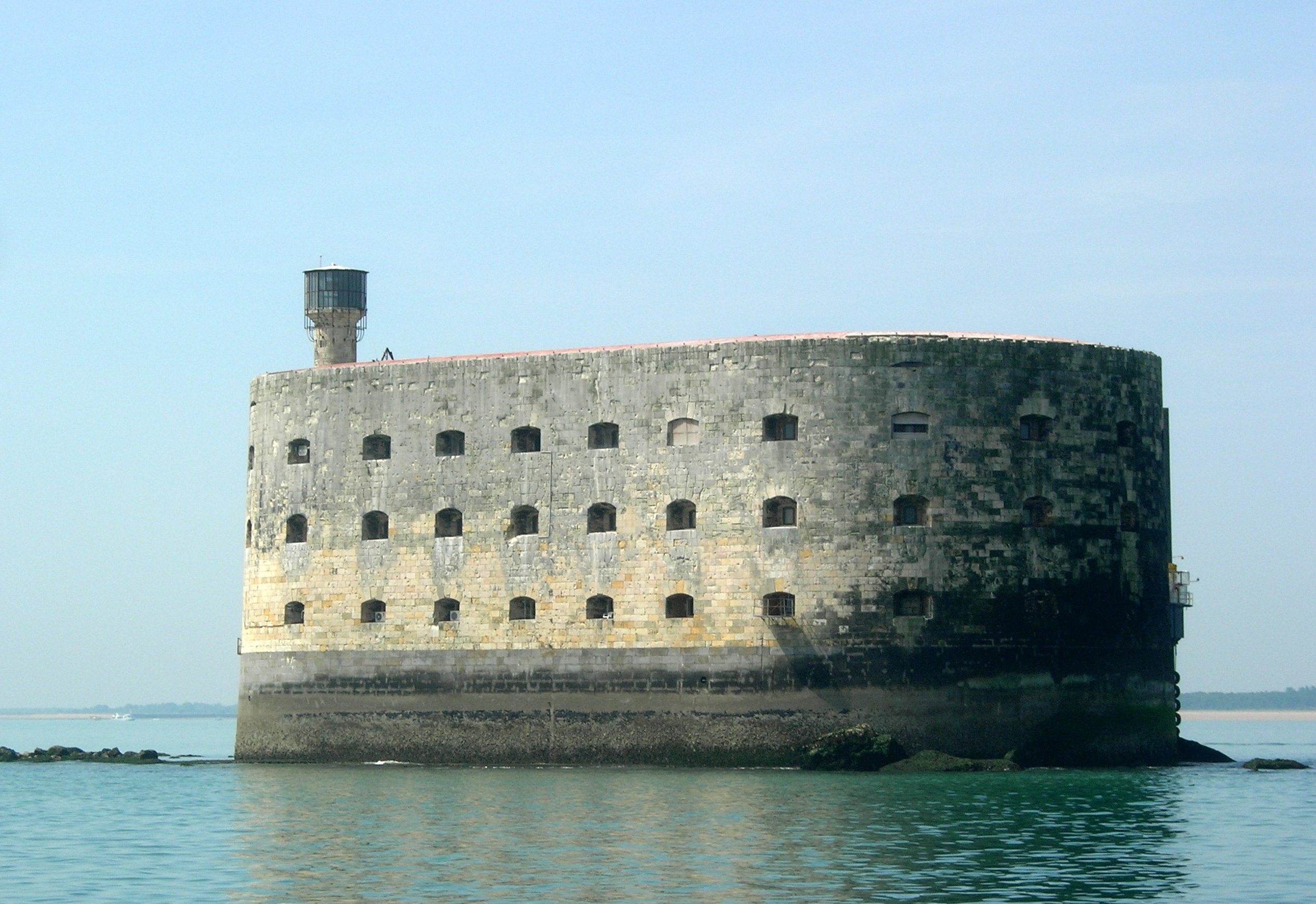
Fort Boyard

== People ==
- Charles-Amable Lenoir

== See also ==
- Communes of the Charente-Maritime department

== International relations ==
- , Agia Paraskevi, Greece
- , Geroskipou, Cyprus
