= Île-d'Aix =

- Commune
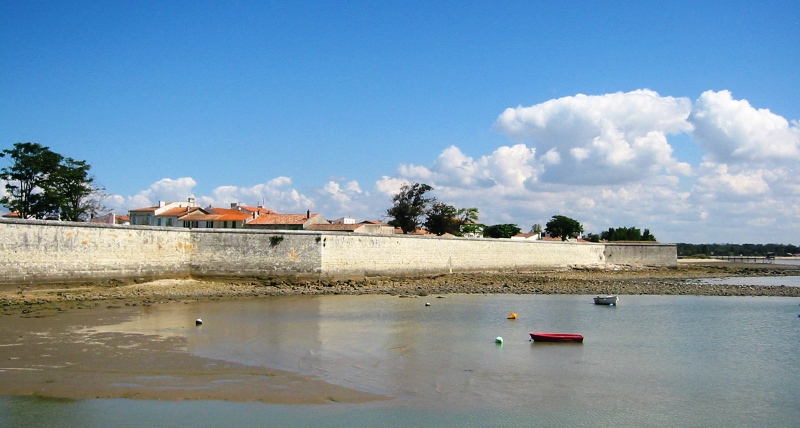
- The fortifications of Île-d'Aix

- Coat of arms
- Location of Île-d'Aix
- Location within France Location within Nouvelle-Aquitaine
- Coordinates: 46°00′44″N 1°10′30″W
- Country: France
- Region: Nouvelle-Aquitaine
- Department: Charente-Maritime
- Arrondissement: Rochefort
- Canton: Châtelaillon-Plage
- Intercommunality: CA Rochefort Océan

Government
  - Mayor (2020–2026): Patrick Denaud
- Area^{1}: 1.19 km^{2} (0.46 sq mi)
- Elevation: 9 m (30 ft)
- Highest elevation: 15 m (49 ft)
- Lowest elevation: 0 m (0 ft)
- Population (2023): 186
  - Density: 156/km^{2} (405/sq mi)
- Demonym: Aixois.e
- Time zone: UTC+01:00 (CET)
  - Summer (DST): UTC+02:00 (CEST)
- INSEE/Postal code: 17004 /17124
- ^{1} French Land Register data, which excludes lakes, ponds, glaciers > 1 km^{2} (0.386 sq mi or 247 acres) and river estuaries.

Île-d'Aix (pronounced [il dɛks]) is a commune in the French department of Charente-Maritime, region of Nouvelle-Aquitaine (before 2015: Poitou-Charentes), off the west coast of France. It occupies the territory of the small Isle of Aix (French: île d'Aix), in the Atlantic Ocean. It is a popular place for tourist day-trips during the summer months.

== Location ==
Île-d'Aix is located at the mouth of the river Charente, between Oléron Island and the coast of mainland France. The island is also close to Fort Boyard.

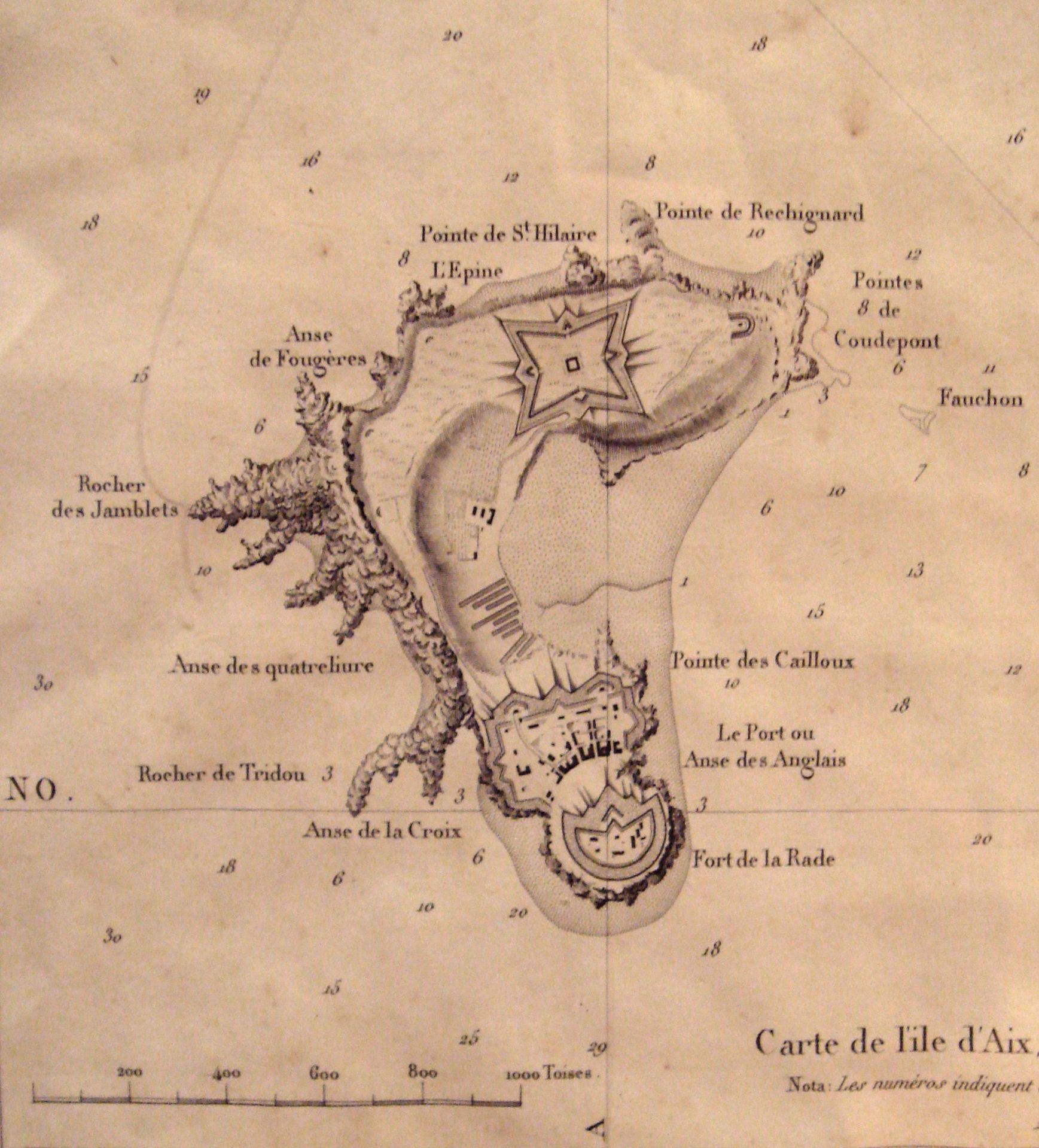
Map of Île-d'Aix, by Fleuriau de Bellevue, 1823

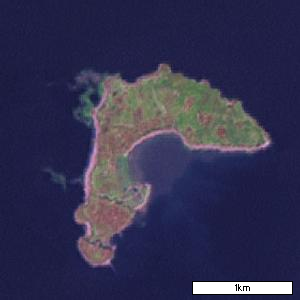
Satellite photograph of Ile d'Aix

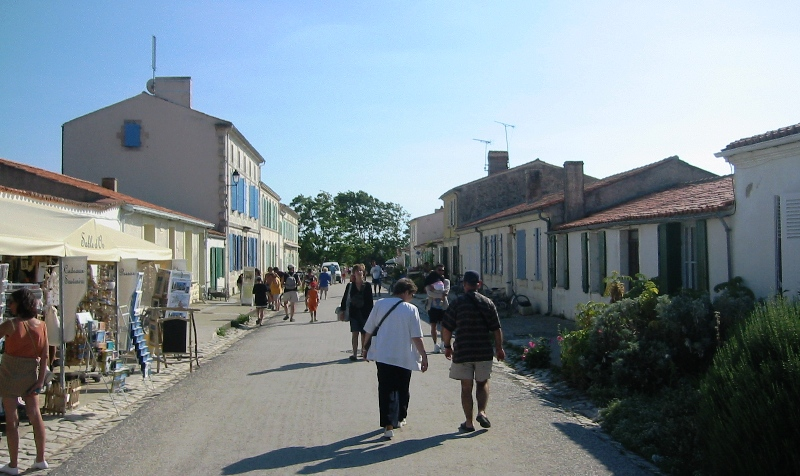
The main street in the village.

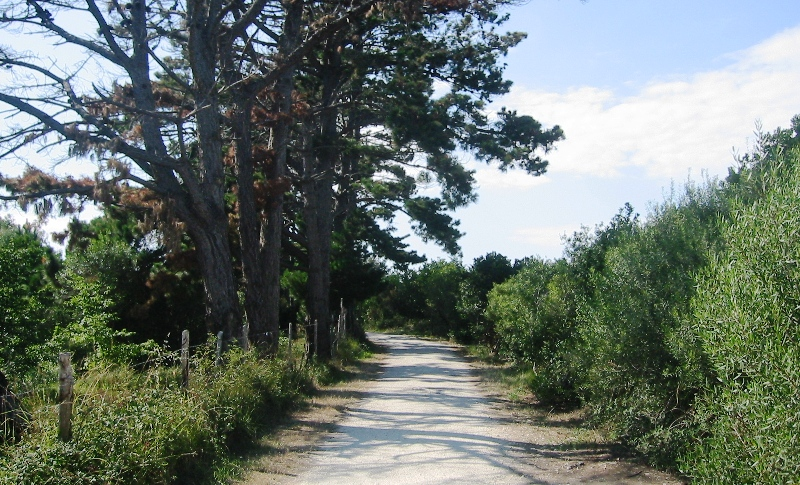
A forest road in the north of the island.

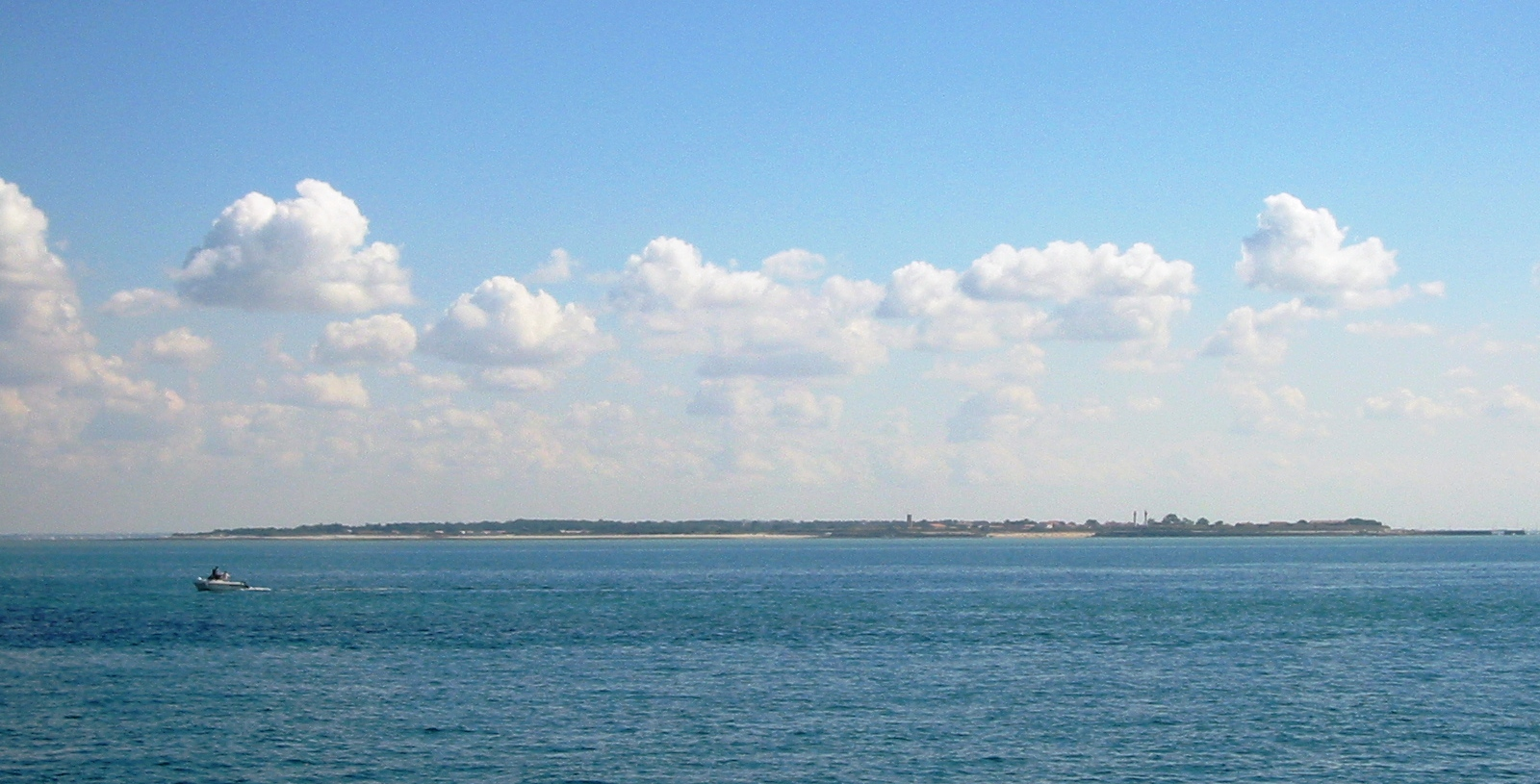
Île-d'Aix, as seen from the south-west, from Fort Boyard.

== History ==
During the Roman period, it seems the island was connected to the continent at low tide. It took its current shape around 1500.

In 1067, Isembert de Châtelaillon gave the island to the order of Cluny. A small convent was established, which depended on St Martin on Île de Ré.

At the end of the 12th century, France and England fought for the possession of the island. Until 1286, the island was located at the boundary between the French and the English Saintonge, formed by the estuary of the river Charente. During the Hundred Years' War, the island became English for about 15 years.

In the 16th century, during the French Wars of Religion, the island became Catholic and then Protestant.

In 1665, nearby Rochefort was established as a strategic harbour for the Kingdom, leading to the construction of many fortifications in the area. Vauban built numerous fortifications on the island, which Ferry completed in 1704.

During the Seven Years' War (1756–1763), the British captured the island in 1757 and destroyed its ramparts as part of the attempted Raid on Rochefort, before withdrawing several weeks later. The island was again captured by British forces in 1759 following the Battle of Quiberon Bay and occupied until the end of the war in 1763. The fortifications were then rebuilt by several French officers, including Marc René, marquis de Montalembert and Pierre Choderlos de Laclos, the author of Les Liaisons dangereuses.

During the French Revolution, in 1794, the island was used as a prison for the suppression of religious opponents in which hundreds of priests were left to die in moored prison-boats. About 226 were buried in the sands of Île-d'Aix.

=== Napoleonic period ===
Napoleon famously visited the island in 1808 and gave directions to reinforce the fortifications. He ordered the construction of a house for the commander of the stronghold (today's Musée Napoléon) and the construction of Fort Liedot, named after a colonel killed in the Russian campaign.

In 1809, the Battle of the Basque Roads (French: Bataille de l'Île d'Aix) was a naval battle off the island of Aix between the Royal Navy and the Atlantic Fleet of the French Navy. On the night of 11 April 1809, Captain Thomas Cochrane led a British fireship attack against a squadron of French warships anchored in the Basque Roads. In the attack, all but two of the French ships were driven ashore. The subsequent engagement lasted three days but failed to completely destroy the French fleet.

From 12 to 15 July 1815, after the defeat at Waterloo, Napoleon spent his last days in France at Île d'Aix, in an attempt to slip past a Royal Navy blockade and escape to North America. Realising the impossibility of accomplishing his plan, he wrote a letter to the British regent and finally surrendered to HMS Bellerophon, which took him to Torbay and Plymouth before he was transferred to Saint Helena.

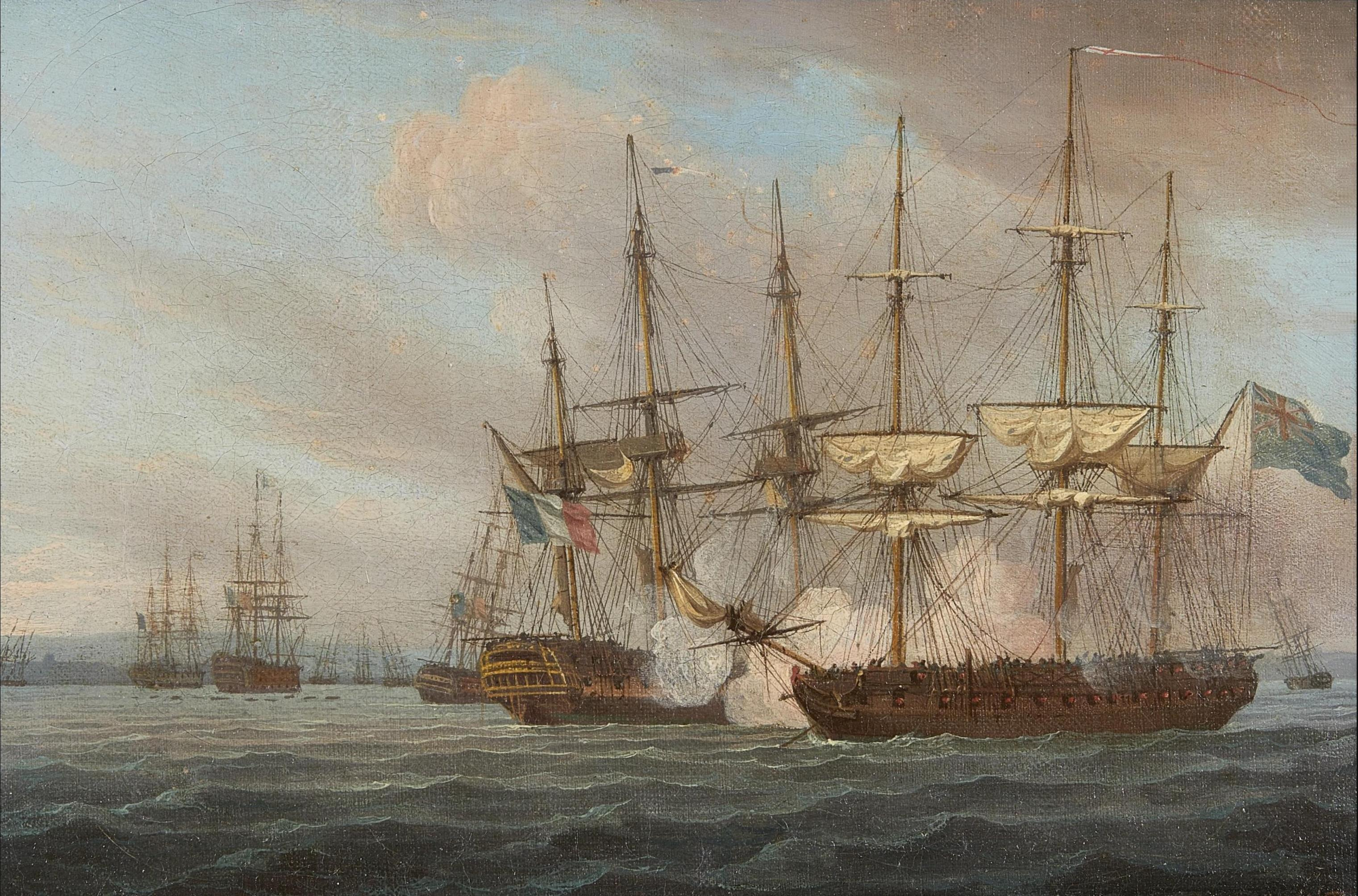
The Battle of the Basque Roads, April 1809.

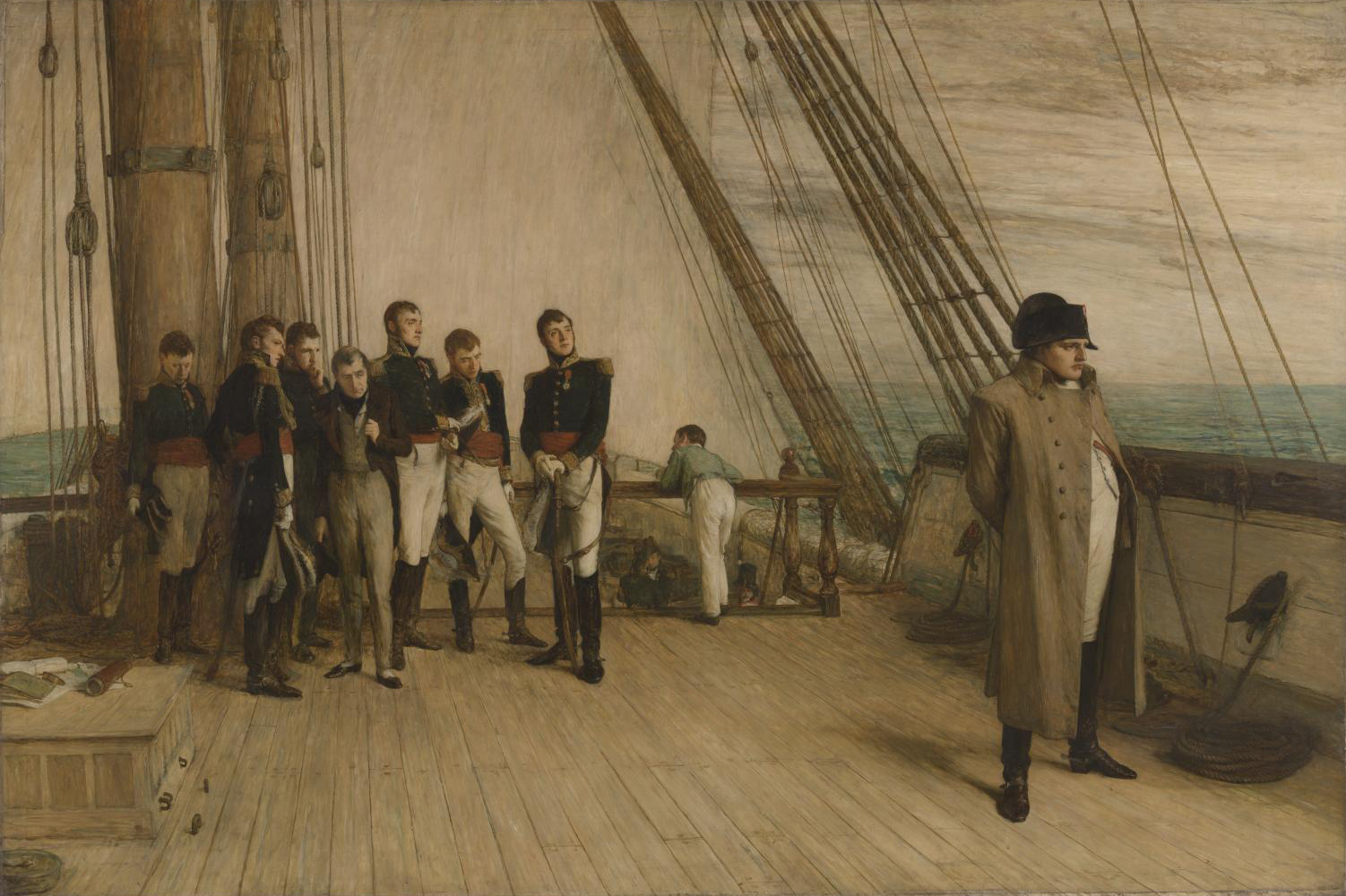
Napoleon on HMS Bellerophon after his 1815 surrender.

== Population ==
Historical population
Year	Pop.	±% p.a.
1968	207	—
1975	207	+0.00%
1982	173	−2.53%
1990	199	+1.77%
1999	186	−0.75%
2007	219	+2.06%
2012	241	+1.93%
2017	224	−1.45%
2023	186	−3.05%
Source: INSEE

== Fort Liédot ==
Located on the island is the large Fort Liédot, built as a naval fortress to defend the Pertuis d'Antioche. Construction began in 1811 on the orders of Napoleon Bonaparte, and took 24 years to complete. The fort was built as part of a chain of fortifications and artillery batteries which protected the strait and defended the port at Rochefort. Napoleon would later spend his last days in France at Fort Liédot, having fled there in July 1815 at the end of the Hundred Days and shortly thereafter surrendering to the Royal Navy on 15 July 1815.

During the Crimean War in the 1850s France used the fort to detain captured Russian soldiers, and from then until the 1960s Fort Liédot would be used off and on as a military prison detaining various political prisoners. It was abandoned after the Crimean War and later used as an artillery target in 1863. In 1871 Fort Liédot would again be used as a prison, this time detaining Communards awaiting deportation to the at-the-time French colony of New Caledonia. In the Interwar period the fort was used as a summer camp. The Algerian independentist and future President Ben Bella was imprisoned there from 1956 to 1962, together with other National Liberation Front militants such as Mohamed Khider and Hocine Aït Ahmed.

== Transport ==
Access to the island is provided by a year-round ferry, which leaves several times a day from Fouras, just east of the island, or from La Rochelle, and Oléron, during the summer months. Cars (except for service vehicles) are prohibited on the island, which allows more tranquility. People move around on foot or by bicycle. Horse carriages are also available to travel on the island.

== See also ==
- Communes of the Charente-Maritime department
