= Fort Boyard (fortification) =

Fort in Charente-Maritime, France

- In the Pertuis d'Antioche straits, between the Île-d'Aix and the île d'Oléron, on the west coast of France
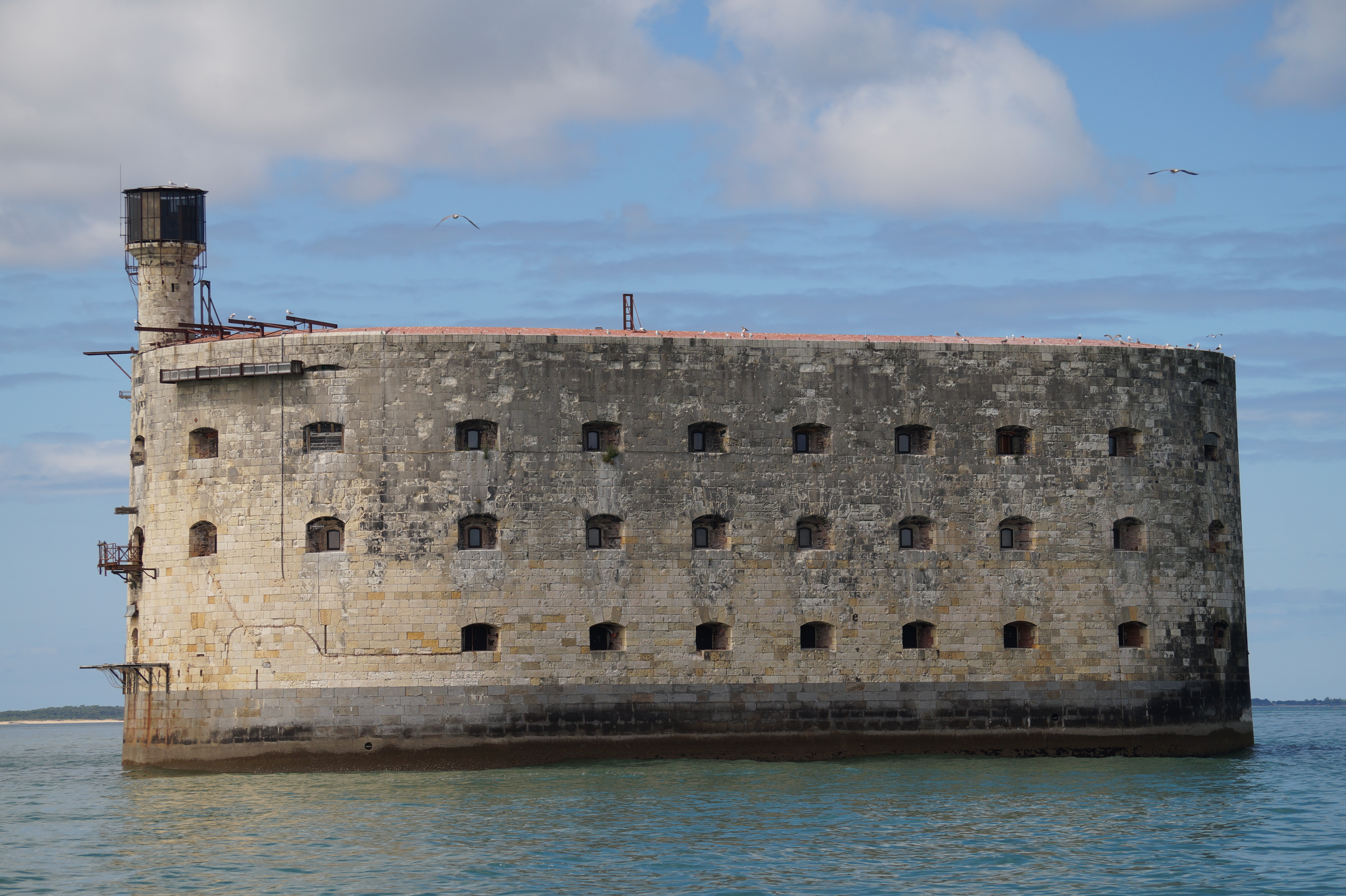
- Fort Boyard in August 2018

Site information
- Type: Fortress
- Controlled by: France

Location
- Location within France
- Coordinates: 45.9996°N 1.2139°W

Site history
- Built: Started 1801, completed 1857
- In use: 1857–1913

Garrison information
- Garrison: 250 soldiers

Fort Boyard (French pronunciation: [fɔʁ bwajaʁ]) is a fort built on Boyard bank, an ocean bank located between the Île-d'Aix and the Île d'Oléron in the Pertuis d'Antioche straits on the west coast of France. Though a fort on Boyard bank was suggested as early as the 17th century, it was not until the 1800s under Napoleon Bonaparte that work began. Building started in 1801 and was completed in 1857. In 1967, the final scene of the French film Les aventuriers was filmed at the remains of the fort. Since 1990, it is the filming location for the eponymous TV game show.

== Layout ==
Fort Boyard is stadium-shaped, 68 metres (223 ft) long and 31 m (102 ft) wide. The walls were built 20 m (66 ft) high. At the centre is a yard, and the ground floor provided stores and quarters for the men and officers. The floor above contained casemates for the emplacements of guns and further quarters. Above that were facilities for barbette guns and mortars.

== History ==
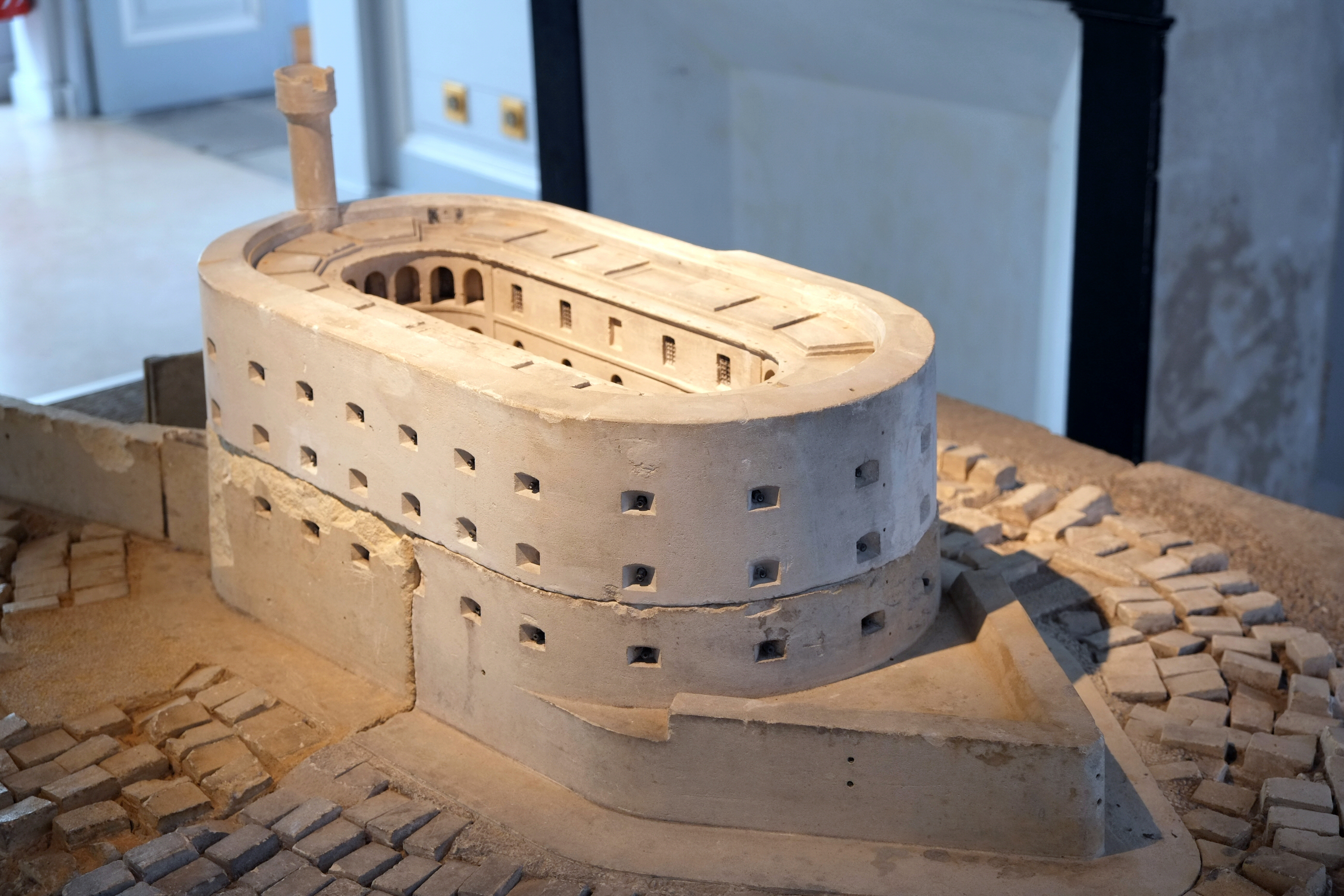
Scale model of the fort with the landing haven and the breakwater spur, made for the 1867 World's Fair and now on display at the Rochefort branch of the French National Navy Museum.

=== Origins (17th–18th centuries) ===
The construction of the fort was first considered during a build-up of the French armed forces undertaken by Louis XIV between 1661 and 1667. The Pertuis d'Antioche was a frequent site of naval engagements between the navies of France and England during this time, and France had already established fortifications on nearby islands and peninsulae to fend off incursions from the English Royal Navy. With the limited range of artillery in the 17th century, there was an unprotected gap between the fields of fire of the fortifications on the islands of Aix and Oléron; a fort on Boyard bank, roughly midway between the two, would have filled that gap. Fort Boyard was to form a line of fortifications with artillery stationed on Oléron (to the west), Fort de la Rade (on Île-d'Aix to the east), and Fort Énet (on a tidal island even further to the east) to protect the port and arsenal at Rochefort. In 1692 the French engineer Descombs began planning the construction of the fort; however, once it became clear how expensive it would be the scheme was abandoned. Vauban, Louis XIV's leading military engineer, famously advised against it, saying "Your Majesty, it would be easier to seize the moon with your teeth than to attempt such an undertaking in such a place".

After a British raid on Île-d'Aix in 1757, plans for a fort on Boyard bank were once again considered. Though plans were drawn up, it was abandoned again due to the logistical problems.

=== Napoleonic initiation and interruptions ===
Efforts were renewed under Napoleon Bonaparte in 1800, and the following year engineers Ferregeau and Armand Samuel de Marescot, and Vice-Admiral François Étienne de Rosily-Mesros designed a fort to be built on the bank. To facilitate the work, a port was established on île d'Oléron. The village of Boyardville was built for the workers. The first stage of construction was to establish an artificial plateau, some 100 by 50 m (330 by 160 ft), to act as foundation. To this end, stones were piled up on Boyard bank.

The project was suspended in 1809.

=== Mid 19th century construction restart and completion ===
Construction resumed in 1837, under Louis Philippe I, following renewed tensions with the United Kingdom. The fortifications were completed in 1857.

=== Operational period and decline ===
Designed to house up to 250–260 men, it became operational around 1859 with sufficient room for a garrison of 250 men; however, by this time the range of artillery cannons had significantly increased, covering the hitherto unprotected gap and making the fort unnecessary.

After 1871, Fort Boyard was briefly used as a military prison, and abandoned in 1913, after which the unmaintained fort slowly deteriorated and crumbled into the sea.

=== Later use and restoration ===
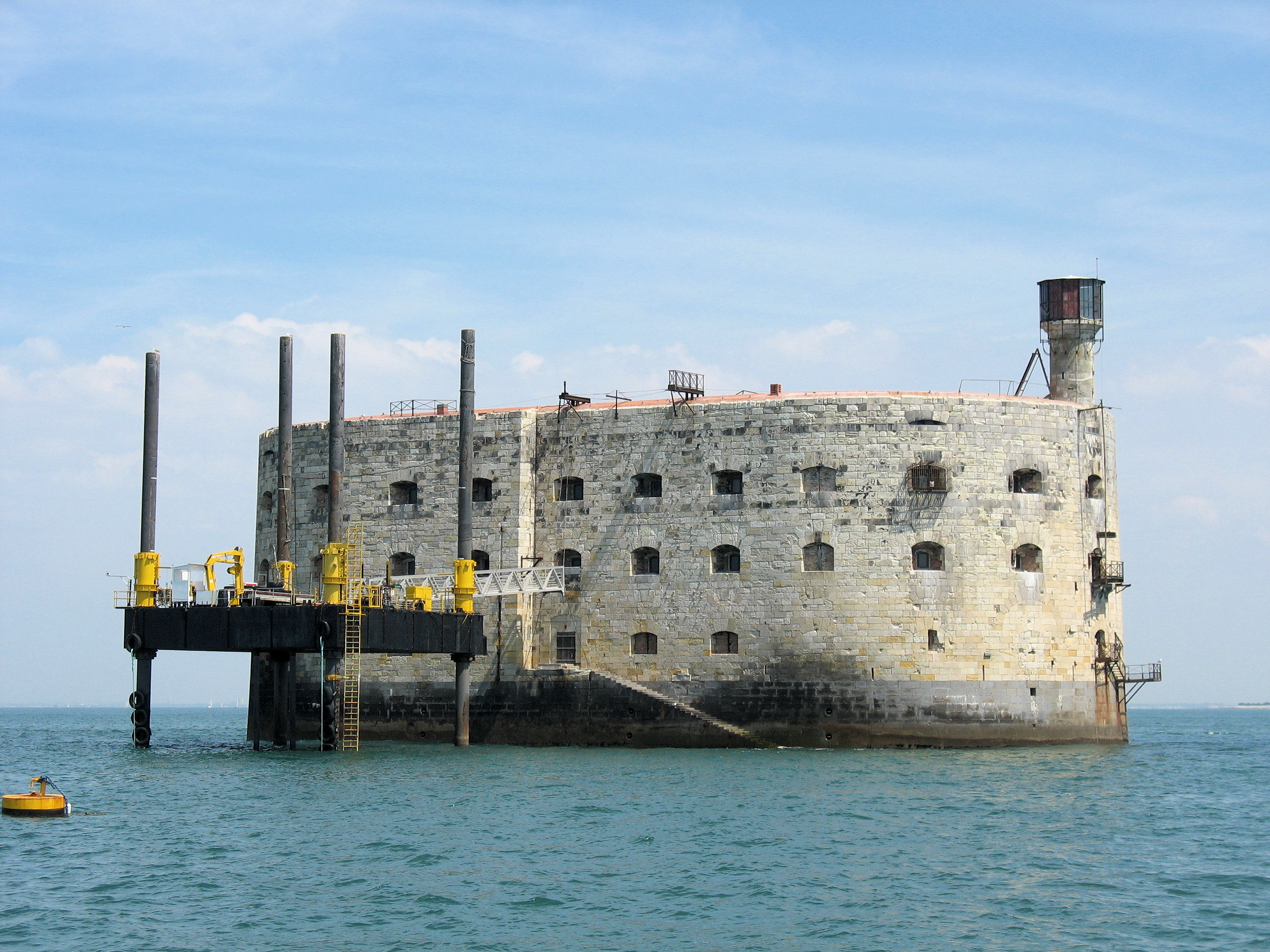
The first SEERS 3 self-elevating platform used for boat access between 1989 and 2015.

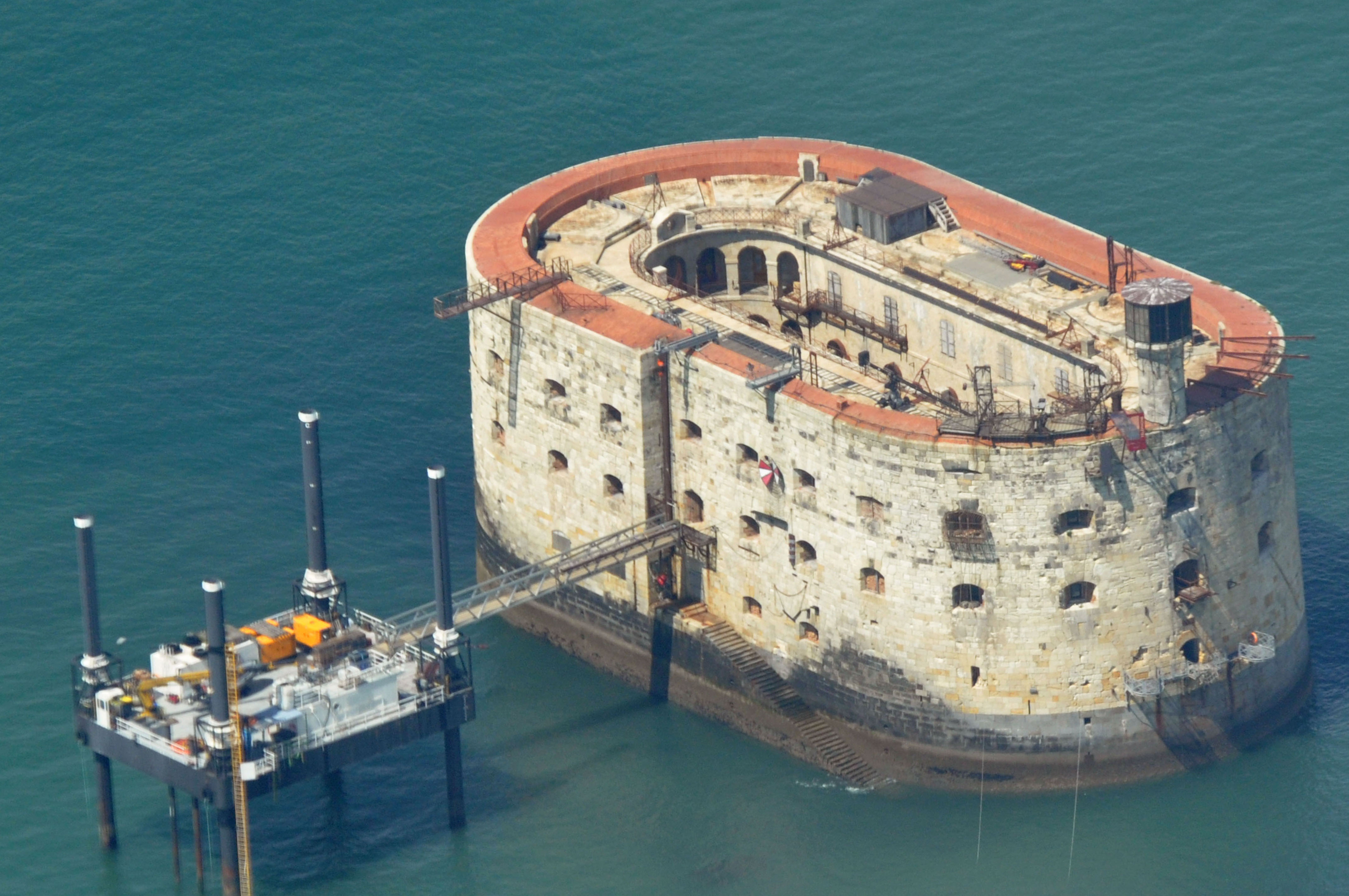
The second Banjaert platform, with a new entrance and metal balcony on the 1st floor. (pictured in June 2021)

In 1950 it was made a listed building, and in 1961 was sold to Charente Maritime Regional Council.

Sold in 1962 at auction to a Belgian dentist, it attracted attention as a location for filming The Last Adventure, starring Alain Delon, Lino Ventura and Joanna Shimkus in 1967 and again in 1981 for TV game show La Chasse aux trésors.

Acquired in 1988 by producer Jacques Antoine, it was transferred to the Charente-Maritime département for €1 under the condition of financed restoration in order to host the new game show Fort Boyard. It has been used as the location for the filming of both the French and international versions of the TV game show of the same name each year since 1990.

In 1989, the reconstruction of the fort began in preparation for hosting the game show. An access platform for the berth of ships was built 25 metres from it (the old fort pier was destroyed long ago). The fort was completely cleared of a huge layer of guano (50 cm thick). The fort is also accessible by air via a wooden helipad built in 1991 on the northeast part of the terrace, allowing a helicopter to land there. Originally intended to be replaced by a larger structure offset on the northern rim of the fortress, it was ultimately rebuilt identically and in the same location in April 2018. In 1996, artillery platforms were also restored. However, the fort was still exposed to damage from the sea. Therefore, in 1998, additional restoration work was carried out. The outer walls were completely cleaned and the sealing of the terrace completed. The final stage was the restoration of a central courtyard, which was completed in early 2004.

The Sea Surfer, a boat used since 2004 to provide a connection to the fort from the Pointe de La Fumée in Fouras.

Maritime access to the fort from Fouras is by chartered speedboat during the filming season for the game show; the Baron Gourgaud in 1988 and 1989 of the Inter-Islands cruises, then by speedboat, the Bacman between 1989 and 2003 then the Sea Surfer from 2004. Purchased second-hand during the site's rehabilitation, the SEERS 3 platform, weakened by winter storms and corrosion, and despite work carried out on its flotation caissons in particular, had to be replaced in March 2015 by a new, larger platform, named Banjaert in homage to the original name of the sandbank. Furthermore, in April 2016, the first floor gunport located above the main entrance at the top of the stairs was enlarged in height, to the size of a door, and fitted with a metal balcony in order to serve as a secondary access and thus be able to continue to connect the platform to the fort with the footbridge, especially in case of heavy swell.

=== Future work and opening to the public ===
Over time, the fort began to suffer serious damage from sea waves, particularly on the northern side, where a stone breakwater had previously been located. In April 2024, the Charente-Maritime department announced the launch of a large-scale project to save the fort. Between 2025 and 2027, it is planned to completely restore the historic breakwater and port harbor (barachois), which have been destroyed by time. The project is estimated to cost 36 million euros. After this work is completed, in 2028, the fort is planned to open to limited tourist access for the first time in its history.

The reconstruction of the spur to the north aims to protect the fort from swell and sea currents, while avoiding any transmission of mechanical forces to the structure itself. The reconstruction of the southern landing stage aims to protect the rear of the fort and its foundations from the action of the swell, while allowing, when nautical conditions permit, direct access to the fort. The purpose of the berm restoration is to limit the effects of erosion and scouring generated by currents and waves. Protecting the entire perimeter of the fort is essential to maintain the stability of its foundation. The replacement of protective blocks helps dissipate some of the wave energy upstream of the structures, thus acting as a first barrier before the waves reach the reconstructed structures, then the fort.
