= Isle of Oléron railway =

Narrow-gauge railway in France

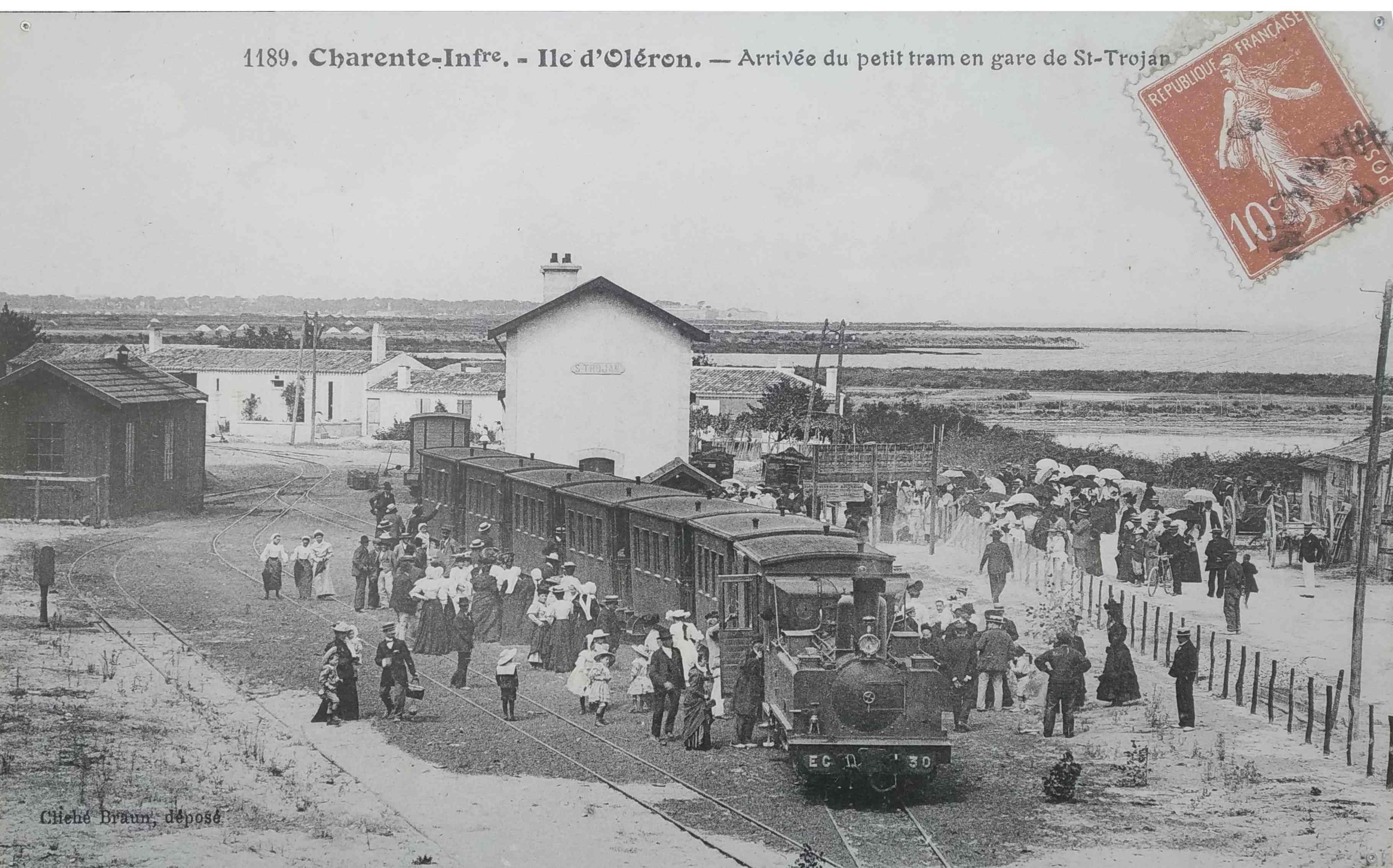
Arrival of a train at Saint-Trojan, Isle of Oléron

The Isle of Oléron railway was a metre gauge secondary railway which was in service from 1904 to 1935, running north to south on the Isle of Oléron, in Charente-Maritime, France. It was operated by the local railway 'la compagnie des chemins de fer économiques des Charentes'.

== History ==
Within the context of the development of local lines in the late 19th century, the General Council of Charente-Inférieure (Conseil Général de Charente-Inférieure) gave its consent to construction of the line in 1894.

The main line was from Saint-Trojan-les-Bains to Saint-Denis-d'Oléron and was opened on 25 April 1904, in the presence of Emile Combes, president of the Council, also mayor of Pons and a senator of Charente-Inférieure. The branch from Sauzelle to Boyardville was opened on 17 May 1904. At this time, the journey from north to south took 2 hours 20 minutes.

From 1904, four daily return trips were made on the main line, and three on the Boyardville branch.

Four years later, the service had increased to eight daily return trips. Freight traffic included oysters, agricultural products and mail.

Due to the increasing level of road traffic which developed on the island, the railway's passenger service ceased in 1934 leaving freight services to run until 1935.

== Route ==
The line connected the two towns at the ends of the island with a route length of 37 km. On almost half of the route, the track followed the side of the roads; for the remainder, the railway had its own alignment.

The line included 28 stations or halts from north to south, of which the principal stations were: Saint-Denis-d'Oléron, Saint-Georges-d'Oléron, Sauzelle, Saint-Pierre-d'Oléron, Dolus-d'Oléron, Le Château-d'Oléron, La Chevalerie, Grand-Village, Petit-Village, Saint-Trojan-les-Bains.

A 5 km branch from Sauzelle served the town of Boyardville.

== Rolling Stock ==
Motive power was provided by Corpet-Louvet 0-6-0T locomotives (030 in French nomenclature), as used on other parts of the chemins de fer économiques de Charente.

== Surviving structures ==
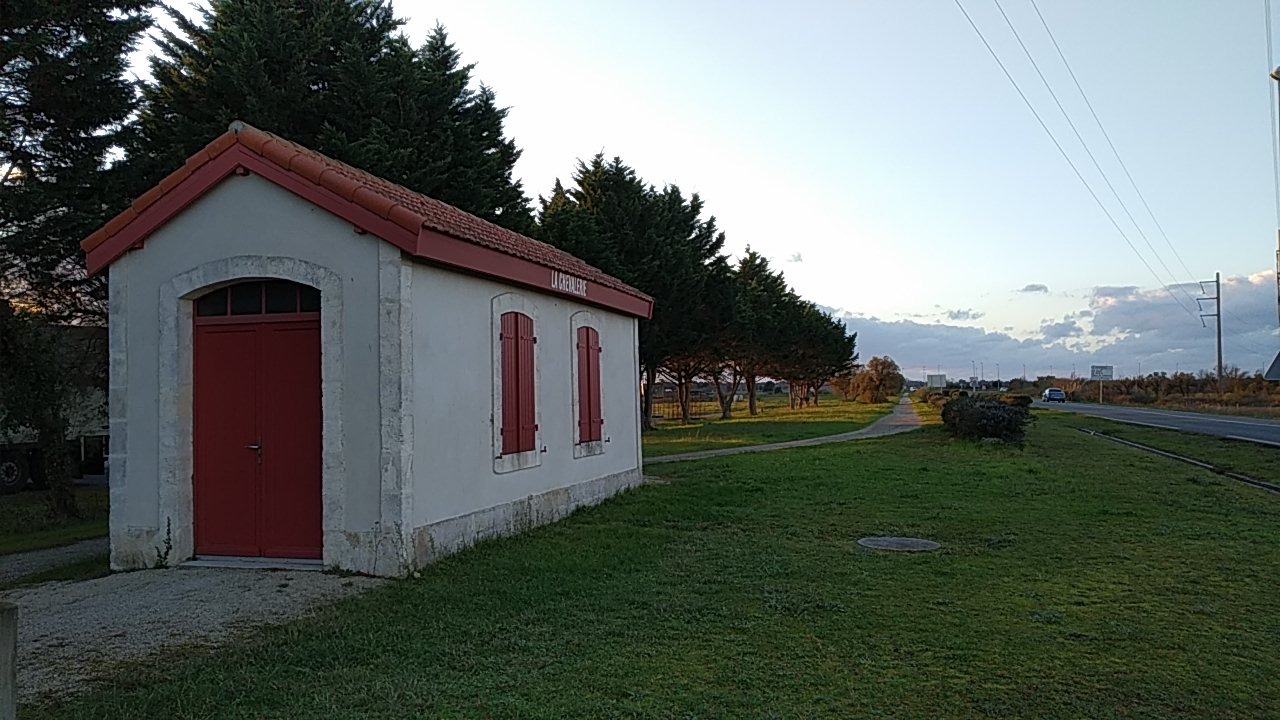
Old station of La Chevalerie

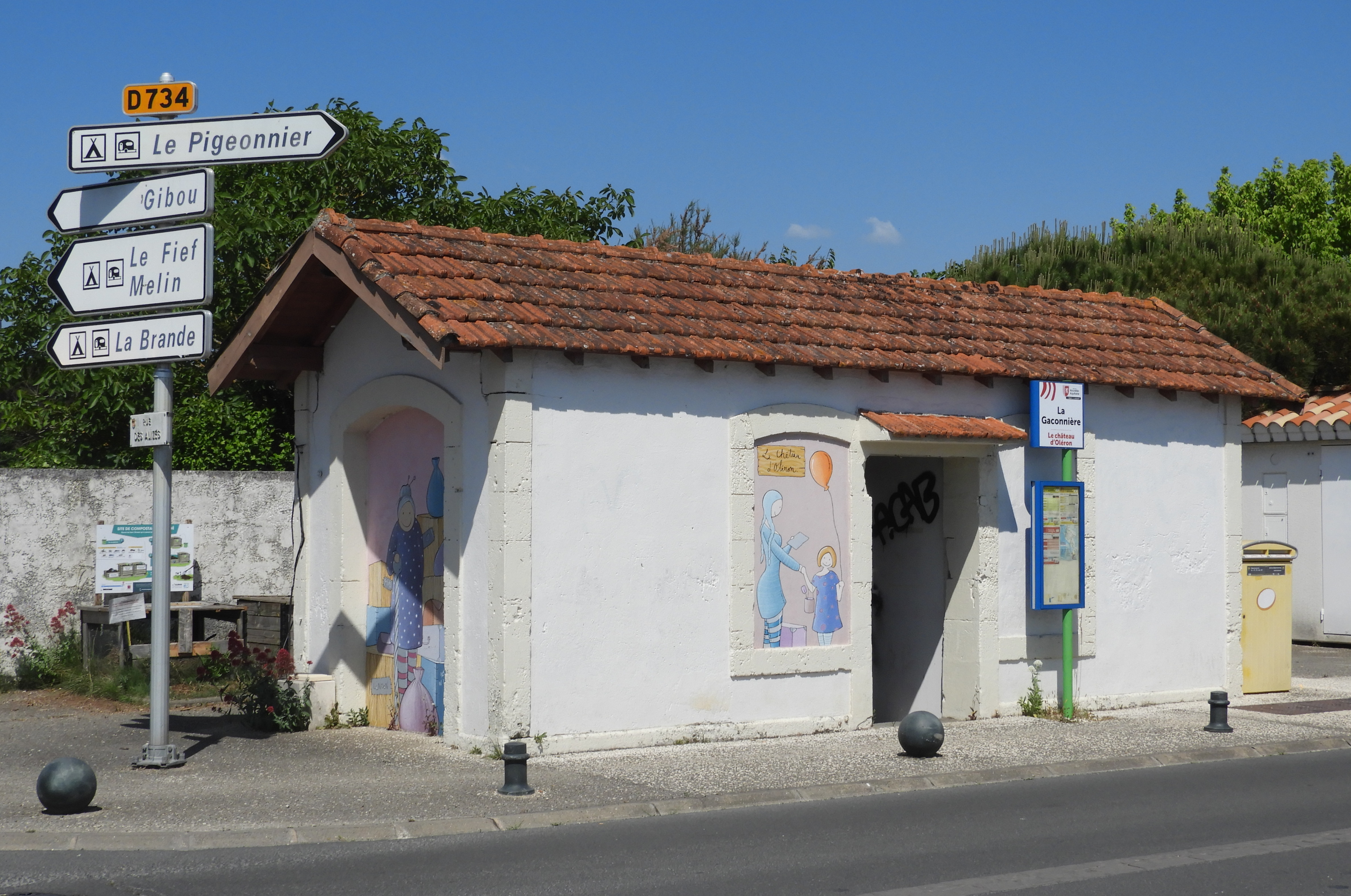
Old station of La Gaconnière

Very little of the railway's infrastructure survives. The old station of la Chevalerie has been renovated and contains photographs illustrating the railway. La Gaconnière station now serves as a bus stop. Boyardville station is still visible on the road to Sauzelle.

A large part of the railway's alignment was taken over to build roads, for example the D26E2 linking Le Grand-Village to La Chevalerie, whilst the old road passes through Petit-Village (today the D275). More recently, cycle paths have taken over other parts of the route.

== P'tit train de Saint-Trojan ==
Another railway known as the 'P'tit train de St-Trojan' has been operating on the island since 1963 in the town of Saint-Trojan-les-Bains, serving the beaches of Gatseau and Maumusson. However, this is a tourist train that does not use any part of the 1904 route. It was inspired by the model of the Royan tramway which ran on the mainland between Royan and Ronce-les-Bains and is 600mm narrow gauge.
