= Canton of Île d'Oléron =

Coordinates: 45.94°N 1.31°W

The canton of Île d'Oléron (French: canton de l'Île d'Oléron) is an administrative division on the Oléron Island in the department of Charente-Maritime, western France. It was created at the French canton reorganisation which came into effect in March 2015. Its seat is in Saint-Pierre-d'Oléron.

It consists of the following communes:

1. La Brée-les-Bains
2. Le Château-d'Oléron
3. Dolus-d'Oléron
4. Le Grand-Village-Plage
5. Saint-Denis-d'Oléron
6. Saint-Georges-d'Oléron
7. Saint-Pierre-d'Oléron
8. Saint-Trojan-les-Bains
