= La Brée-les-Bains =

- Commune
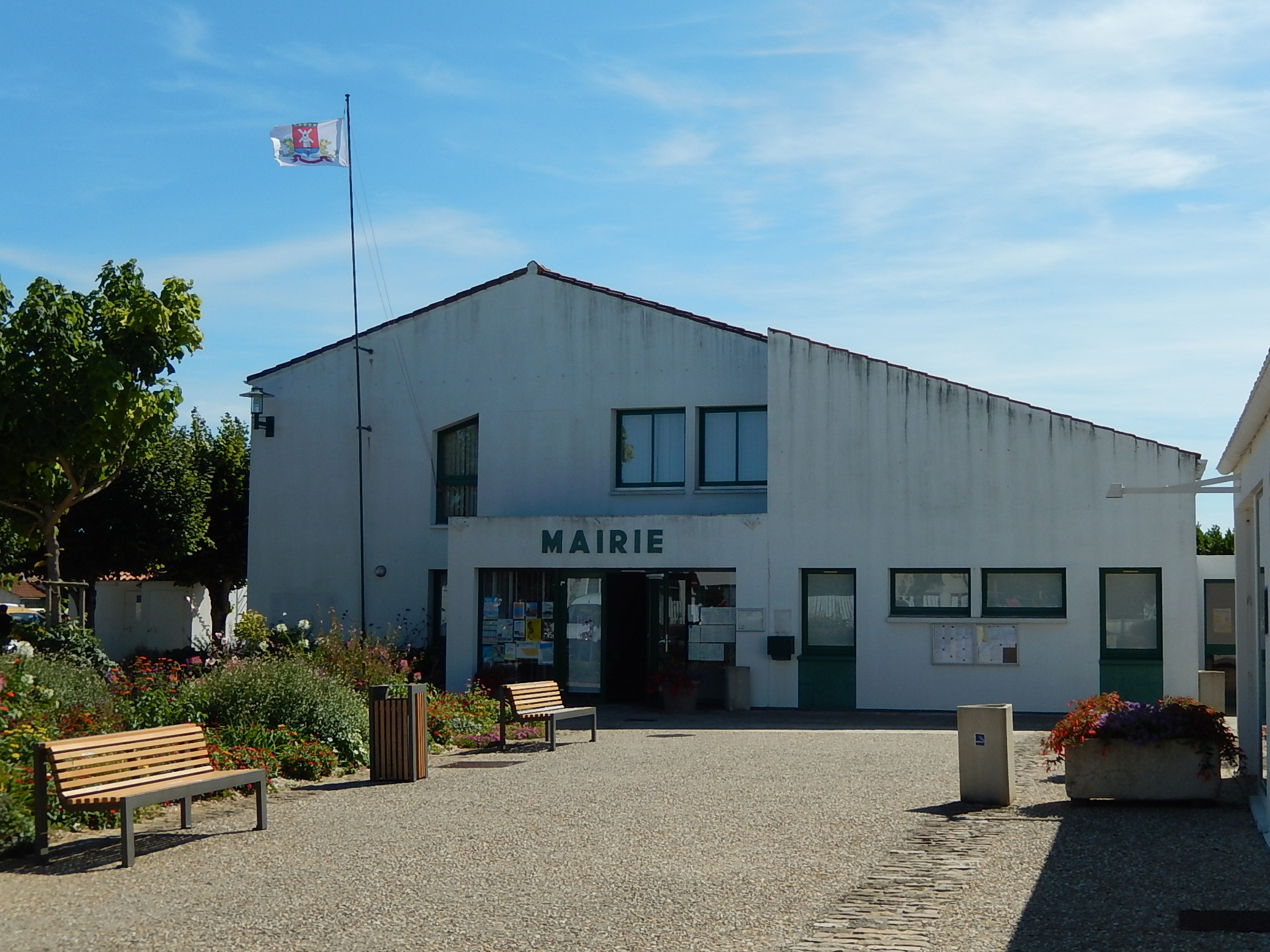
- The town hall in La Brée-les-Bains

- Coat of arms
- Location of La Brée-les-Bains
- Location within France Location within Nouvelle-Aquitaine
- Coordinates: 46°00′58″N 1°20′52″W
- Country: France
- Region: Nouvelle-Aquitaine
- Department: Charente-Maritime
- Arrondissement: Rochefort
- Canton: Île d'Oléron
- Intercommunality: Île-d'Oléron

Government
  - Mayor (2020–2026): Philippe Chevrier
- Area^{1}: 7.27 km^{2} (2.81 sq mi)
- Highest elevation: 11 m (36 ft)
- Lowest elevation: 0 m (0 ft)
- Population (2023): 716
  - Density: 98.5/km^{2} (255/sq mi)
- Time zone: UTC+01:00 (CET)
  - Summer (DST): UTC+02:00 (CEST)
- INSEE/Postal code: 17486 /17840
- ^{1} French Land Register data, which excludes lakes, ponds, glaciers > 1 km^{2} (0.386 sq mi or 247 acres) and river estuaries.

La Brée-les-Bains (French pronunciation: [la bʁe le bɛ̃]) is a commune in the Charente-Maritime department in the Nouvelle-Aquitaine region in southwestern France. It is situated on the island Oléron.

== Population ==
Historical population
Year	Pop.	±% p.a.
1968	525	—
1975	573	+1.26%
1982	578	+0.12%
1990	644	+1.36%
1999	760	+1.86%
2007	747	−0.22%
2012	734	−0.35%
2017	695	−1.09%
2023	716	+0.50%
Source: INSEE

== See also ==
- Communes of the Charente-Maritime department
