= Boyardville =

District of Saint-Georges-d'Oléron, France

Coordinates: 45.97°N 1.24°W

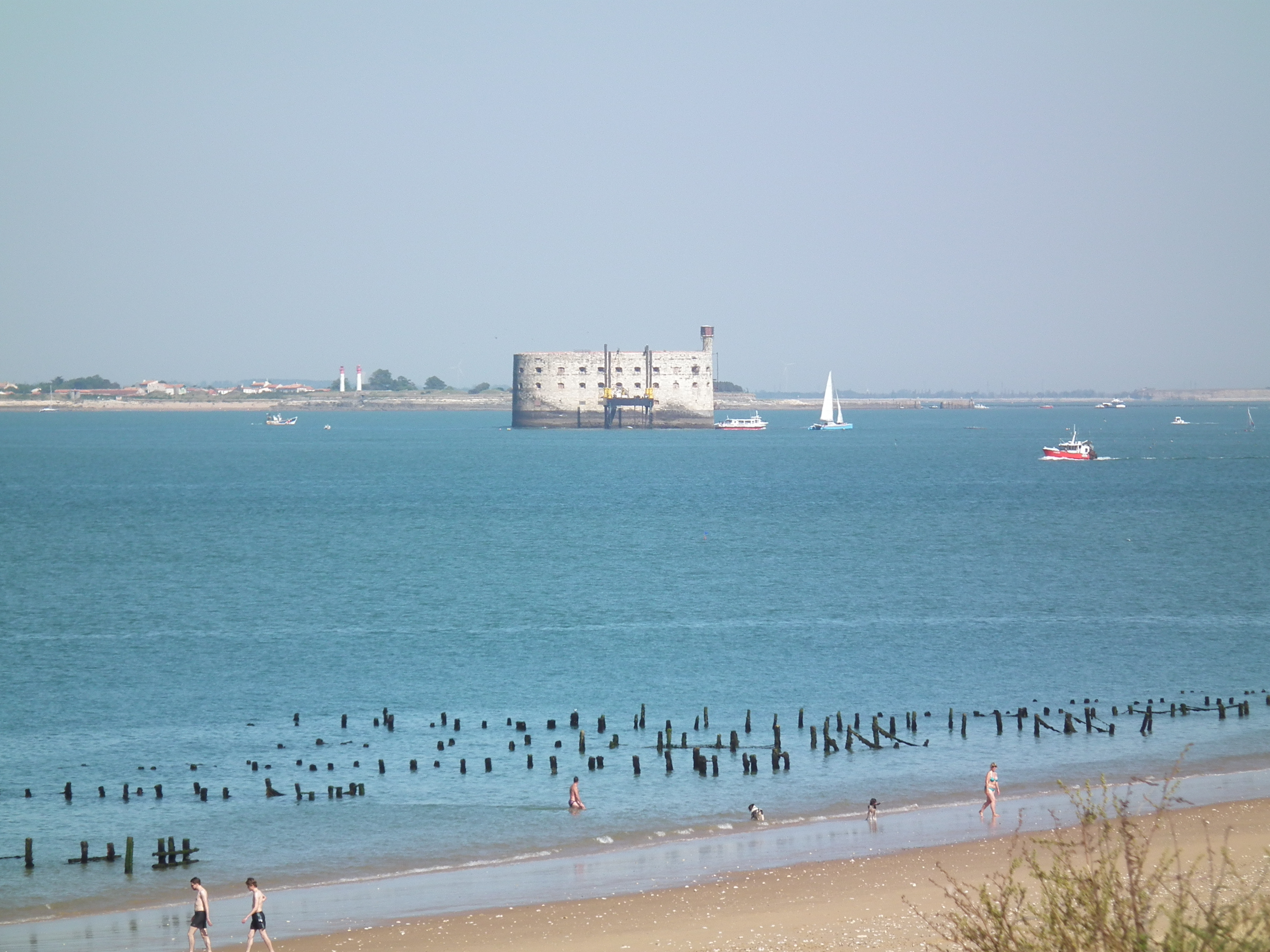
Fort Boyard and the coast of Île-d'Aix from Saumonards Beach in Boyardville

Boyardville (French pronunciation: [bwajaʁˈvil]) is a district in the town of Saint-Georges-d'Oléron on the eastern part of Oléron Island (Île d'Oléron), Charente-Maritime, Nouvelle-Aquitaine, France. The community has a small beach resort, fishing port, and marina, and its shore is a popular spot for surfing.

The name of the district derives from Fort Boyard, a famous Napoleonic ocean fortress located a few kilometres offshore. Materials were stored in Boyardville for construction of the fort, and hundreds of labourers who built it resided in barracks located there.

Less known is Fort Galissonière (formerly Fort Napoleon), located in the Saumonards forest. Designed to protect the mouth of the Charente and the arsenal of Rochefort, it lost any military purpose and is now converted into a summer vacation retreat.

== History ==
Boyardville has a long history mixed with legends, like many places on Oléron Island. According to tradition, a Spanish galleon and its cargo of gold ran aground in 17th century off Saumonards beach.

The village began to develop as large fortifications were built to defend its strategic location, notably Fort Boyard immediately off of its shores. Fort Galissonière, nearby, hosted small military garrisons, and in the 19th century. The French Navy chose Boyardville as the place to operate a torpedo training school, and constructed a Naval academy in 1876. Renowned Torpedo Boat No. 5 was moored at Boyardville for several years.

Boyardville has long been an important port of entry for cargo passing in and out of the island. Once goods unloaded at the docks, they were transferred to a steam railway that served the villages on both ends of the island. The old rail terminal is still visible on Sauzelle Road.

Boyardville was seriously damaged by two extremely violent storms in recent decades. Martin, called "Storm of the Century," struck in December 1999, during which 198 km/h gusts of wind were recorded. Xynthia hit in February 2010, causing massive flood damage from the ocean, as well as bursting a dam that caused flooding that destroyed many neighborhoods.
