= Saint-Pierre-d'Oléron =

- Commune
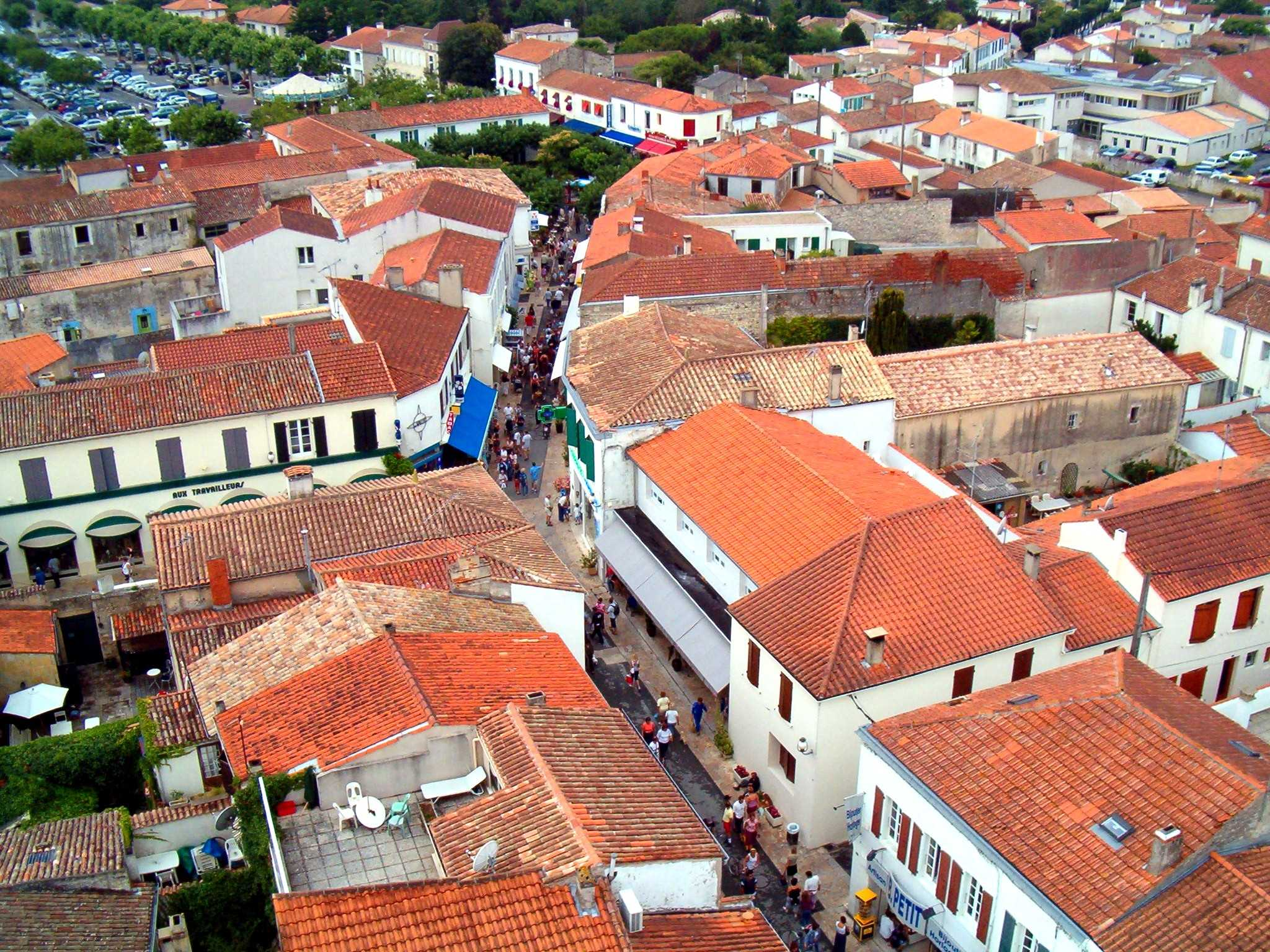
- Saint-Pierre-d'Oléron seen from the bell tower

- Coat of arms
- Location of Saint-Pierre-d'Oléron
- Location within France Location within Nouvelle-Aquitaine
- Coordinates: 45°56′37″N 1°18′21″W
- Country: France
- Region: Nouvelle-Aquitaine
- Department: Charente-Maritime
- Arrondissement: Rochefort
- Canton: Île d'Oléron
- Intercommunality: Île-d'Oléron

Government
  - Mayor (2020–2026): Christophe Sueur
- Area^{1}: 40.55 km^{2} (15.66 sq mi)
- Elevation: 2 m (6.6 ft)
- Highest elevation: 15 m (49 ft)
- Lowest elevation: 0 m (0 ft)
- Population (2023): 6,633
  - Density: 163.6/km^{2} (423.7/sq mi)
- Time zone: UTC+01:00 (CET)
  - Summer (DST): UTC+02:00 (CEST)
- INSEE/Postal code: 17385 /17310
- ^{1} French Land Register data, which excludes lakes, ponds, glaciers > 1 km^{2} (0.386 sq mi or 247 acres) and river estuaries.

Saint-Pierre-d'Oléron (French pronunciation: [sɛ̃ pjɛʁ dɔleʁɔ̃], lit. 'St. Peter of Oléron', before 1962: Saint-Pierre) is a commune in the French department of Charente-Maritime, southwestern France. It is located on the island of Oléron. As the largest city on the island, it is widely considered to be the island's main city.

== Population ==
Historical population

Year	Pop.	±% p.a.
1793	3,986	—
1800	4,233	+0.86%
1806	4,066	−0.67%
1821	4,419	+0.56%
1831	4,630	+0.47%
1836	4,822	+0.82%
1841	4,769	−0.22%
1846	4,861	+0.38%
1851	4,955	+0.38%
1856	4,777	−0.73%
1861	4,981	+0.84%
1866	5,152	+0.68%
1872	4,968	−0.60%
1876	4,939	−0.15%
1881	4,954	+0.06%
1886	4,829	−0.51%
1891	4,556	−1.16%
1896	4,419	−0.61%
1901	4,350	−0.31%

Year	Pop.	±% p.a.
1906	4,376	+0.12%
1911	4,322	−0.25%
1921	4,035	−0.68%
1926	3,960	−0.37%
1931	3,693	−1.39%
1936	3,553	−0.77%
1946	3,350	−0.59%
1954	3,695	+1.23%
1962	4,025	+1.08%
1968	4,258	+0.94%
1975	4,604	+1.12%
1982	4,782	+0.54%
1990	5,365	+1.45%
1999	5,944	+1.15%
2007	6,204	+0.54%
2012	6,573	+1.16%
2017	6,743	+0.51%
2023	6,633	−0.27%

Source: EHESS and INSEE (1968-2023)

== See also ==
- Communes of the Charente-Maritime department
