= Le Château-d'Oléron =

- Commune
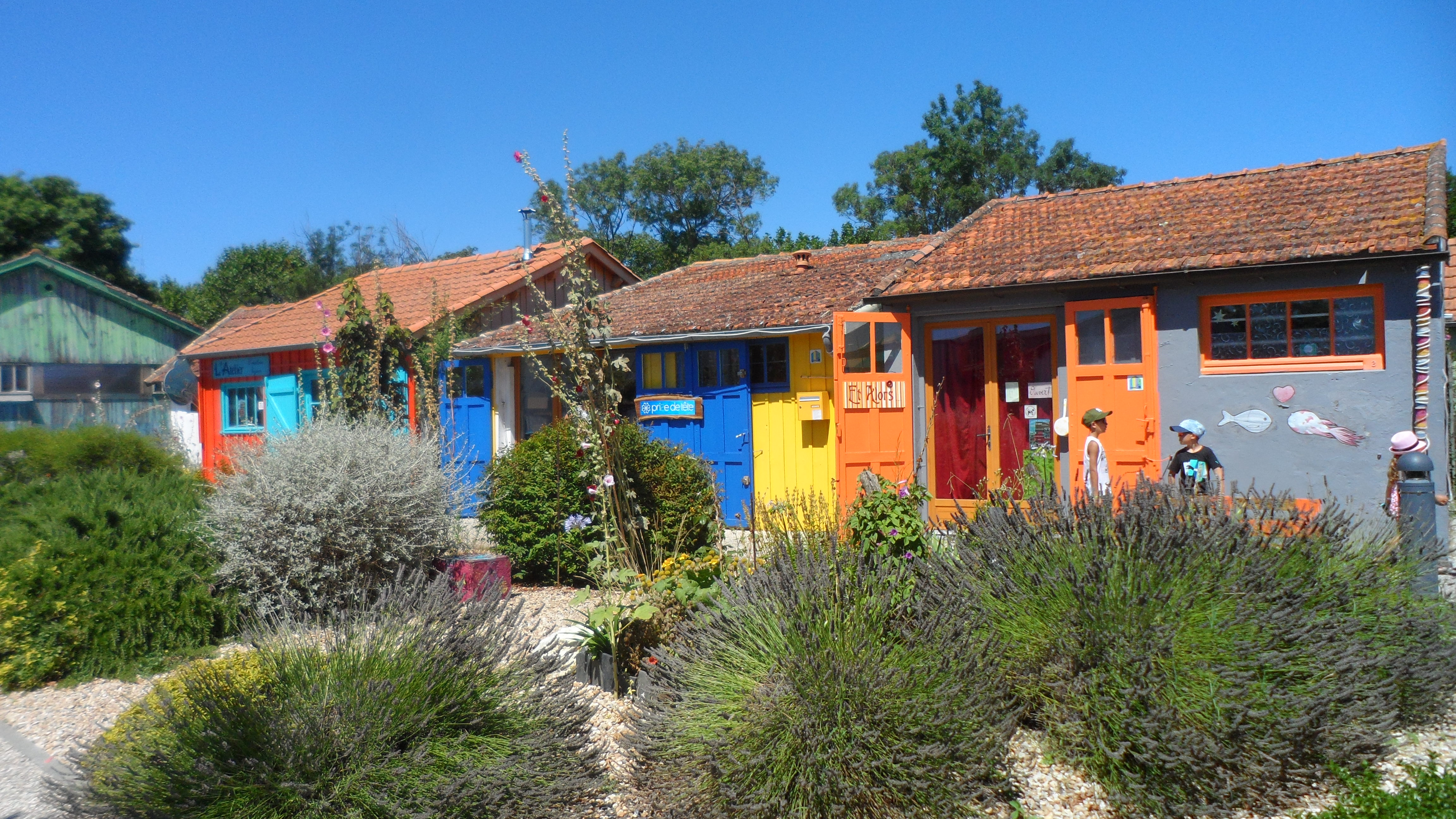
- Art and craft shops in Le Château-d'Oléron

- Coat of arms
- Location of Le Château-d'Oléron
- Location within France Location within Nouvelle-Aquitaine
- Coordinates: 45°53′09″N 1°11′41″W
- Country: France
- Region: Nouvelle-Aquitaine
- Department: Charente-Maritime
- Arrondissement: Rochefort
- Canton: Île d'Oléron
- Intercommunality: Île-d'Oléron

Government
  - Mayor (2020–2026): Michel Parent
- Area^{1}: 15.67 km^{2} (6.05 sq mi)
- Highest elevation: 10 m (33 ft)
- Lowest elevation: 0 m (0 ft)
- Population (2023): 4,366
  - Density: 278.6/km^{2} (721.6/sq mi)
- Time zone: UTC+01:00 (CET)
  - Summer (DST): UTC+02:00 (CEST)
- INSEE/Postal code: 17093 /17480
- ^{1} French Land Register data, which excludes lakes, ponds, glaciers > 1 km^{2} (0.386 sq mi or 247 acres) and river estuaries.

Le Château-d'Oléron (French pronunciation: [lə ʃɑto dɔleʁɔ̃]; before 1962: Le Château) is a commune located on the Island of Oléron, in the Charente-Maritime department, southwestern France.

The town is surrounded by fortifications in the form of a Bastion fort (similar to a "star fort".)

== Population ==
Historical population

Year	Pop.	±% p.a.
1793	2,251	—
1800	2,558	+1.84%
1806	2,735	+1.12%
1821	2,632	−0.26%
1831	2,527	−0.41%
1836	2,644	+0.91%
1841	2,485	−1.23%
1846	2,542	+0.45%
1851	2,632	+0.70%
1856	3,003	+2.67%
1861	2,920	−0.56%
1866	3,211	+1.92%
1872	3,328	+0.60%
1876	2,850	−3.80%
1881	3,132	+1.90%
1886	3,007	−0.81%
1891	3,458	+2.83%
1896	3,573	+0.66%
1901	3,803	+1.26%

Year	Pop.	±% p.a.
1906	3,334	−2.60%
1911	3,734	+2.29%
1921	3,142	−1.71%
1926	3,018	−0.80%
1931	3,061	+0.28%
1936	3,281	+1.40%
1946	2,864	−1.35%
1954	2,870	+0.03%
1962	3,171	+1.25%
1968	3,254	+0.43%
1975	3,324	+0.30%
1982	3,411	+0.37%
1990	3,544	+0.48%
1999	3,552	+0.03%
2007	3,949	+1.33%
2012	3,949	+0.00%
2017	4,184	+1.16%
2023	4,366	+0.71%

Source: EHESS and INSEE (1968-2023)

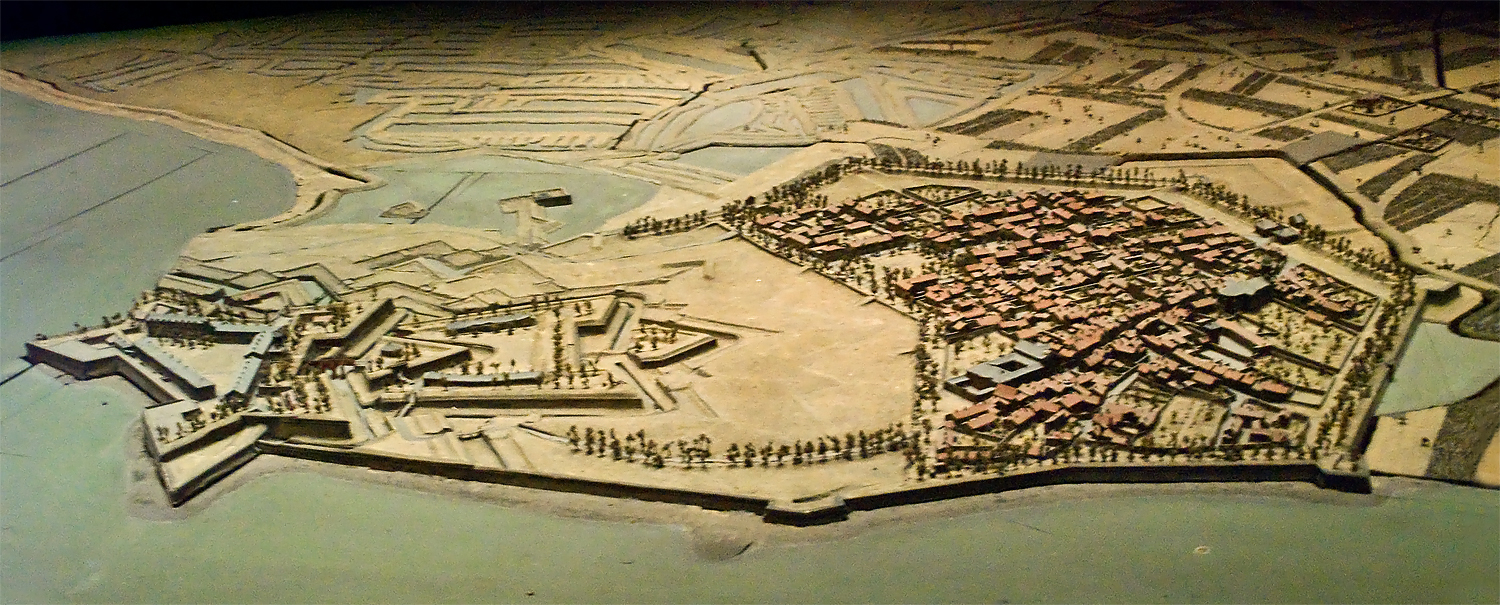
Le Château-d'Oléron, 1703 military mock-up

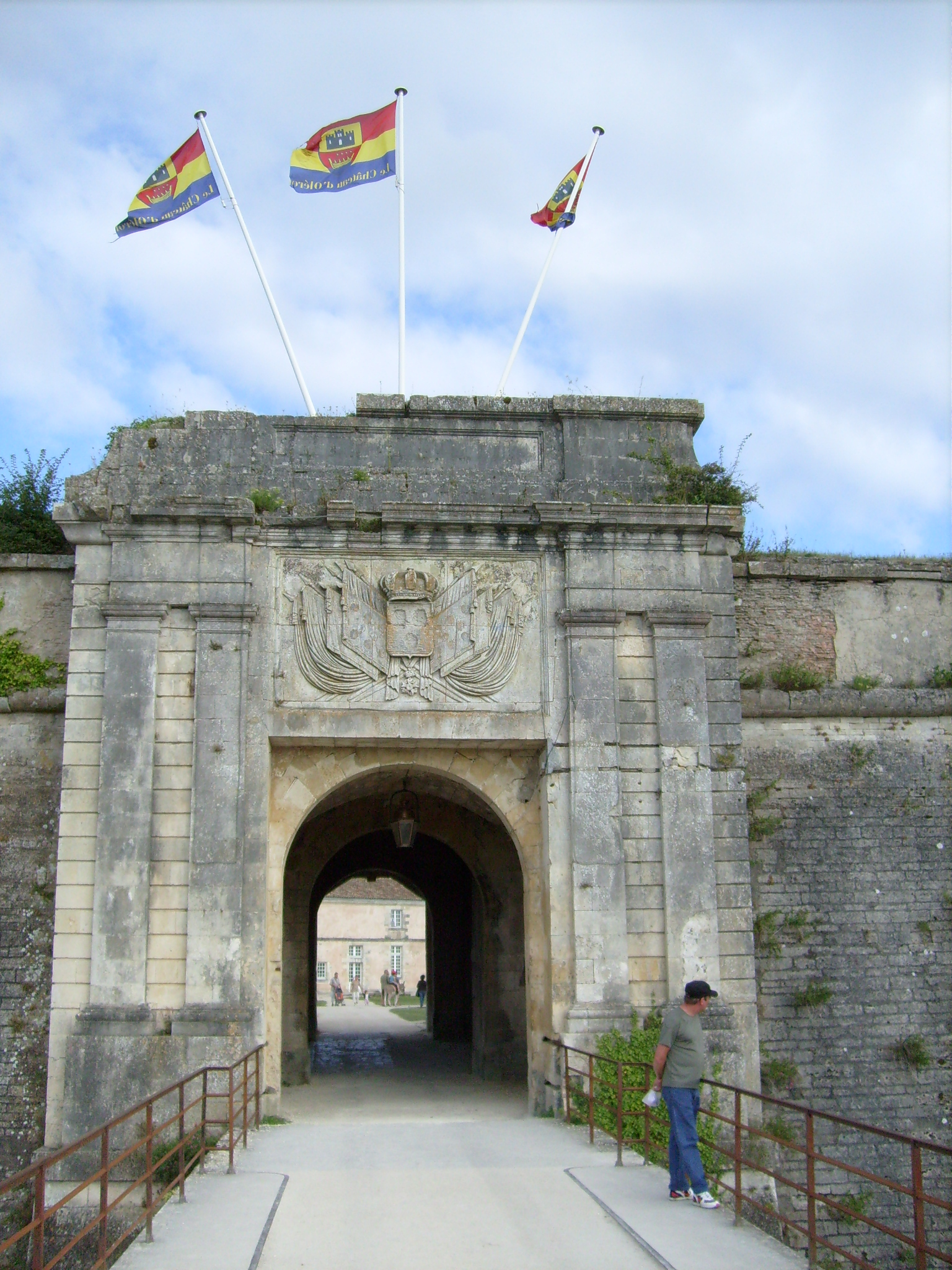
The main gate of the citadel

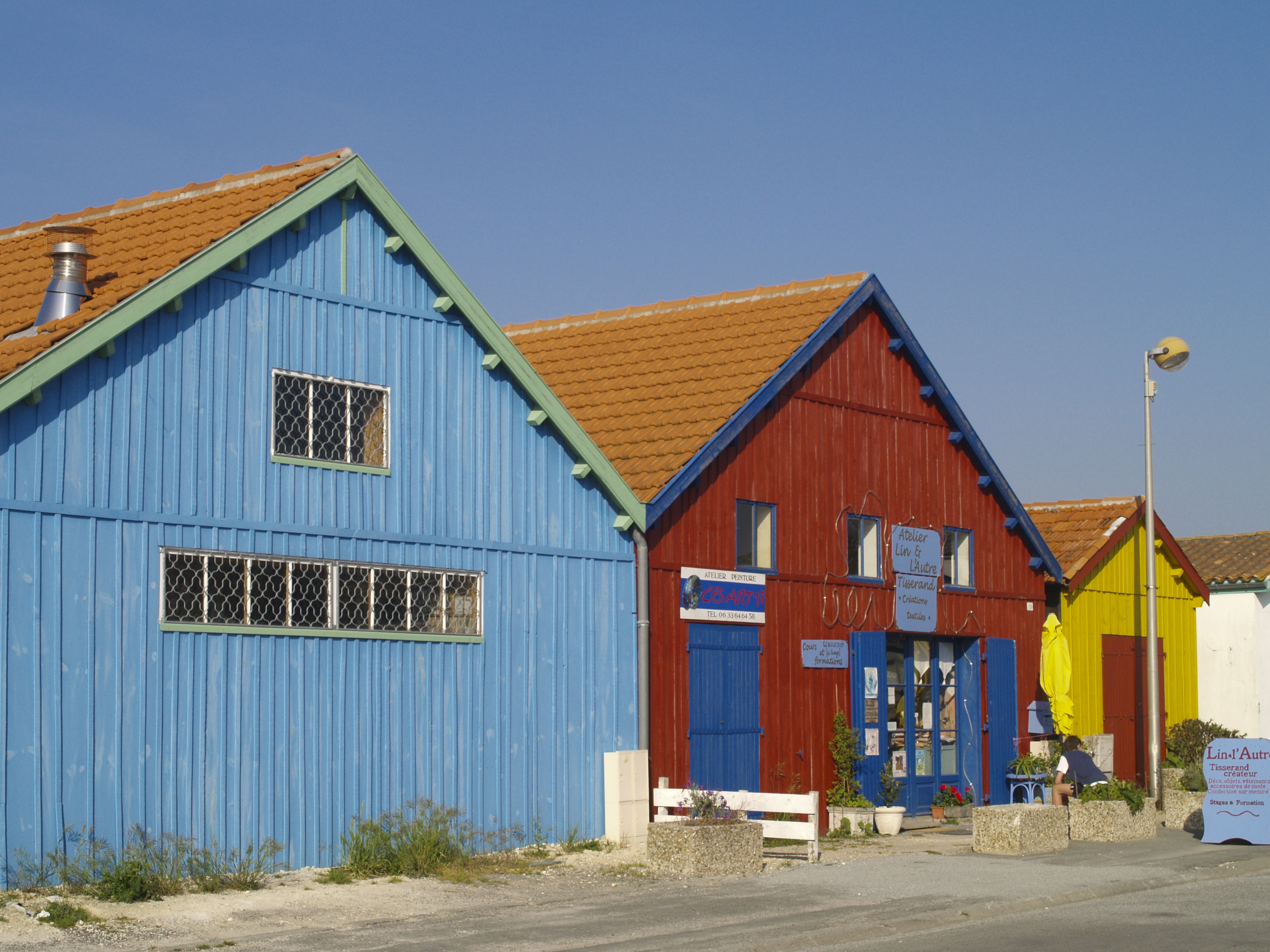
Old oyster farmers' huts renewed and converted into arts and crafts shops

== See also ==
- Communes of the Charente-Maritime department
