= Dolus-d'Oléron =

- Commune
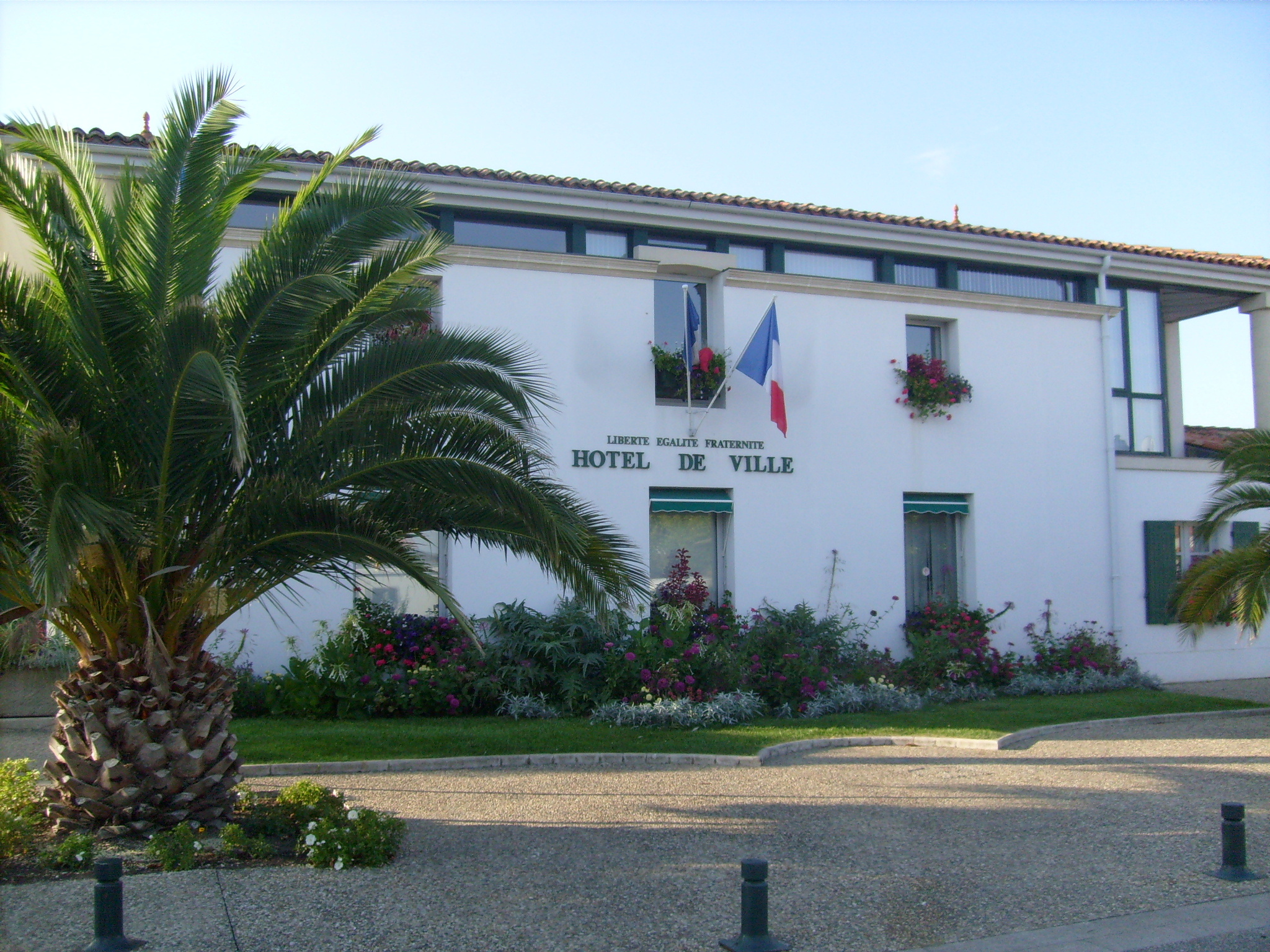
- The town hall in Dolus-d'Oléron

- Coat of arms
- Location of Dolus-d'Oléron
- Location within France Location within Nouvelle-Aquitaine
- Coordinates: 45°54′43″N 1°15′35″W
- Country: France
- Region: Nouvelle-Aquitaine
- Department: Charente-Maritime
- Arrondissement: Rochefort
- Canton: Île d'Oléron
- Intercommunality: Île-d'Oléron

Government
  - Mayor (2022–2026): Thibault Brechkoff
- Area^{1}: 29.02 km^{2} (11.20 sq mi)
- Highest elevation: 20 m (66 ft)
- Lowest elevation: 0 m (0 ft)
- Population (2023): 3,199
  - Density: 110.2/km^{2} (285.5/sq mi)
- Time zone: UTC+01:00 (CET)
  - Summer (DST): UTC+02:00 (CEST)
- INSEE/Postal code: 17140 /17550
- ^{1} French Land Register data, which excludes lakes, ponds, glaciers > 1 km^{2} (0.386 sq mi or 247 acres) and river estuaries.

Dolus-d'Oléron (French pronunciation: [dɔlys dɔleʁɔ̃], lit. 'Dolus of Oléron') is a commune on the Isle of Oléron in the Charente-Maritime department, southwestern France. The area is mostly residential, with a village-style main street with a church and small complex of amenities including a large supermarket, petrol station, DIY shop and some other retail. At the coast is Vert Bois woods and Vert Bois beach.

On 5 November 2025, a driver deliberately drove into a crowd of pedestrians and cyclists while shouting "Allahu Akbar" in Dolus-d'Oléron, injuring at least five people, including two critically.

== Population ==
Historical population
Year	Pop.	±% p.a.
1968	1,786	—
1975	2,006	+1.67%
1982	2,145	+0.96%
1990	2,440	+1.62%
1999	2,723	+1.23%
2007	3,156	+1.86%
2012	3,207	+0.32%
2017	3,229	+0.14%
2023	3,199	−0.16%
Source: INSEE

== See also ==
- Communes of the Charente-Maritime department
