= Le Grand-Village-Plage =

- Commune
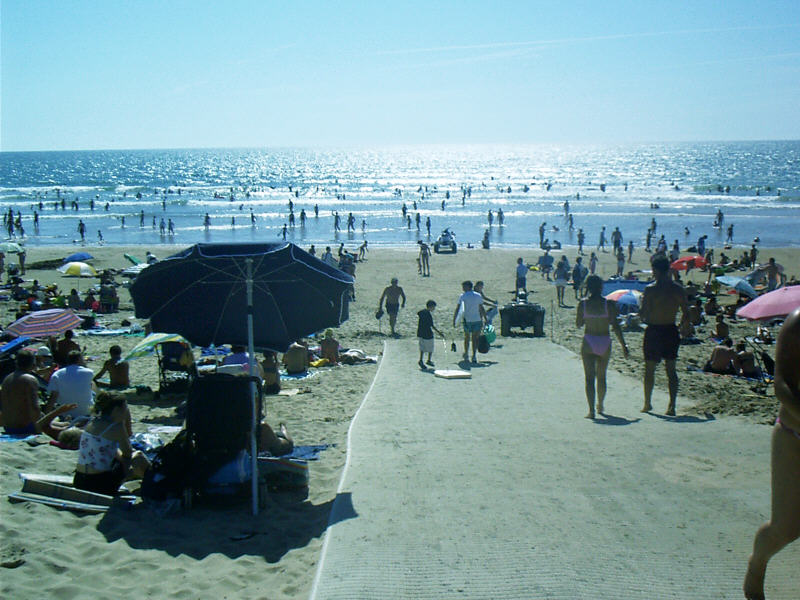
- The beach at Le Grand-Village-Plage

- Coat of arms
- Location of Le Grand-Village-Plage
- Location within France Location within Nouvelle-Aquitaine
- Coordinates: 45°51′39″N 1°14′07″W
- Country: France
- Region: Nouvelle-Aquitaine
- Department: Charente-Maritime
- Arrondissement: Rochefort
- Canton: Île d'Oléron
- Intercommunality: Île-d'Oléron

Government
  - Mayor (2020–2026): Patrice Robillard
- Area^{1}: 6.05 km^{2} (2.34 sq mi)
- Highest elevation: 22 m (72 ft)
- Lowest elevation: 2 m (6.6 ft)
- Population (2023): 1,108
  - Density: 183/km^{2} (474/sq mi)
- Time zone: UTC+01:00 (CET)
  - Summer (DST): UTC+02:00 (CEST)
- INSEE/Postal code: 17485 /17370
- ^{1} French Land Register data, which excludes lakes, ponds, glaciers > 1 km^{2} (0.386 sq mi or 247 acres) and river estuaries.

Le Grand-Village-Plage (French pronunciation: [lə ɡʁɑ̃ vilaʒ plaʒ]) is a commune in the Charente-Maritime department in southwestern France. It is situated on the Île-d'Oléron.

== Population ==
Historical population
Year	Pop.	±% p.a.
1968	697	—
1975	696	−0.02%
1982	711	+0.31%
1990	718	+0.12%
1999	898	+2.52%
2007	981	+1.11%
2012	1,040	+1.17%
2017	1,051	+0.21%
2023	1,108	+0.88%
Source: INSEE

== See also ==
- Communes of the Charente-Maritime department
