= Saint-Georges-d'Oléron =

- Commune
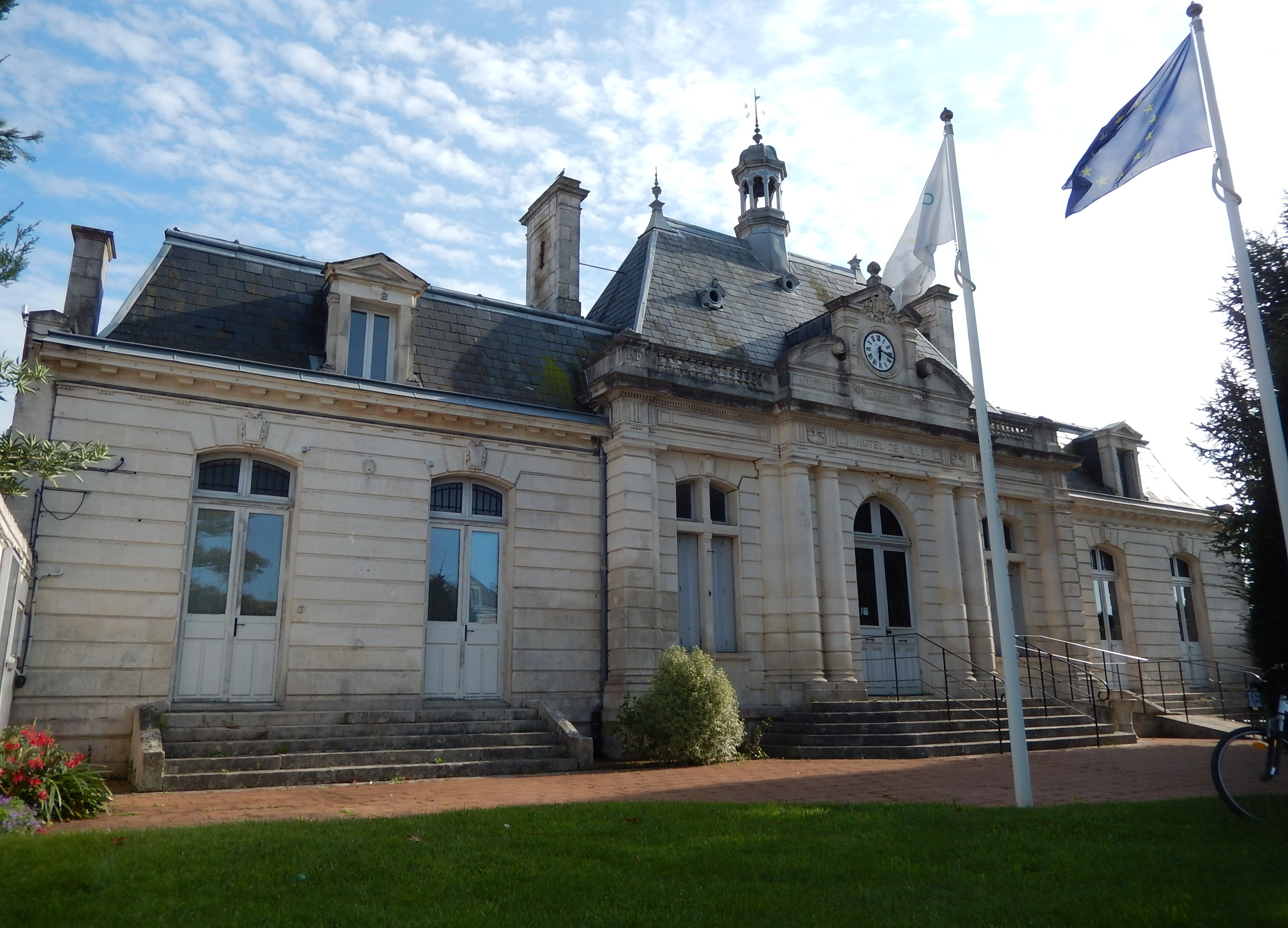
- The town hall in Saint-Georges-d'Oléron

- Coat of arms
- Location of Saint-Georges-d'Oléron
- Location within France Location within Nouvelle-Aquitaine
- Coordinates: 45°58′47″N 1°19′54″W
- Country: France
- Region: Nouvelle-Aquitaine
- Department: Charente-Maritime
- Arrondissement: Rochefort
- Canton: Île d'Oléron
- Intercommunality: Île-d'Oléron

Government
  - Mayor (2020–2026): Dominique Rabelle
- Area^{1}: 46.55 km^{2} (17.97 sq mi)
- Elevation: 6 m (20 ft)
- Highest elevation: 30 m (98 ft)
- Lowest elevation: 0 m (0 ft)
- Population (2023): 4,067
  - Density: 87.37/km^{2} (226.3/sq mi)
- Time zone: UTC+01:00 (CET)
  - Summer (DST): UTC+02:00 (CEST)
- INSEE/Postal code: 17337 /17190
- ^{1} French Land Register data, which excludes lakes, ponds, glaciers > 1 km^{2} (0.386 sq mi or 247 acres) and river estuaries.

Saint-Georges-d'Oléron (French pronunciation: [sɛ̃ ʒɔʁʒ dɔleʁɔ̃], literally Saint-Georges of Oléron, before 1962: Saint-Georges) is a commune on Oléron Island in the Charente-Maritime department, administrative region of Nouvelle-Aquitaine, France.

== Population ==
Historical population
| Year | Pop. | ±% p.a. |
|---|---|---|
| 1968 | 2,664 | — |
| 1975 | 2,718 | +0.29% |
| 1982 | 2,935 | +1.10% |
| 1990 | 3,144 | +0.86% |
| 1999 | 3,287 | +0.50% |
| 2007 | 3,490 | +0.75% |
| 2012 | 3,500 | +0.06% |
| 2017 | 3,719 | +1.22% |
| 2023 | 4,067 | +1.50% |
Source: INSEE

== See also ==
- Boyardville
- Fort Boyard
- Communes of the Charente-Maritime department
