= Saint-Denis-d'Oléron =

- Commune
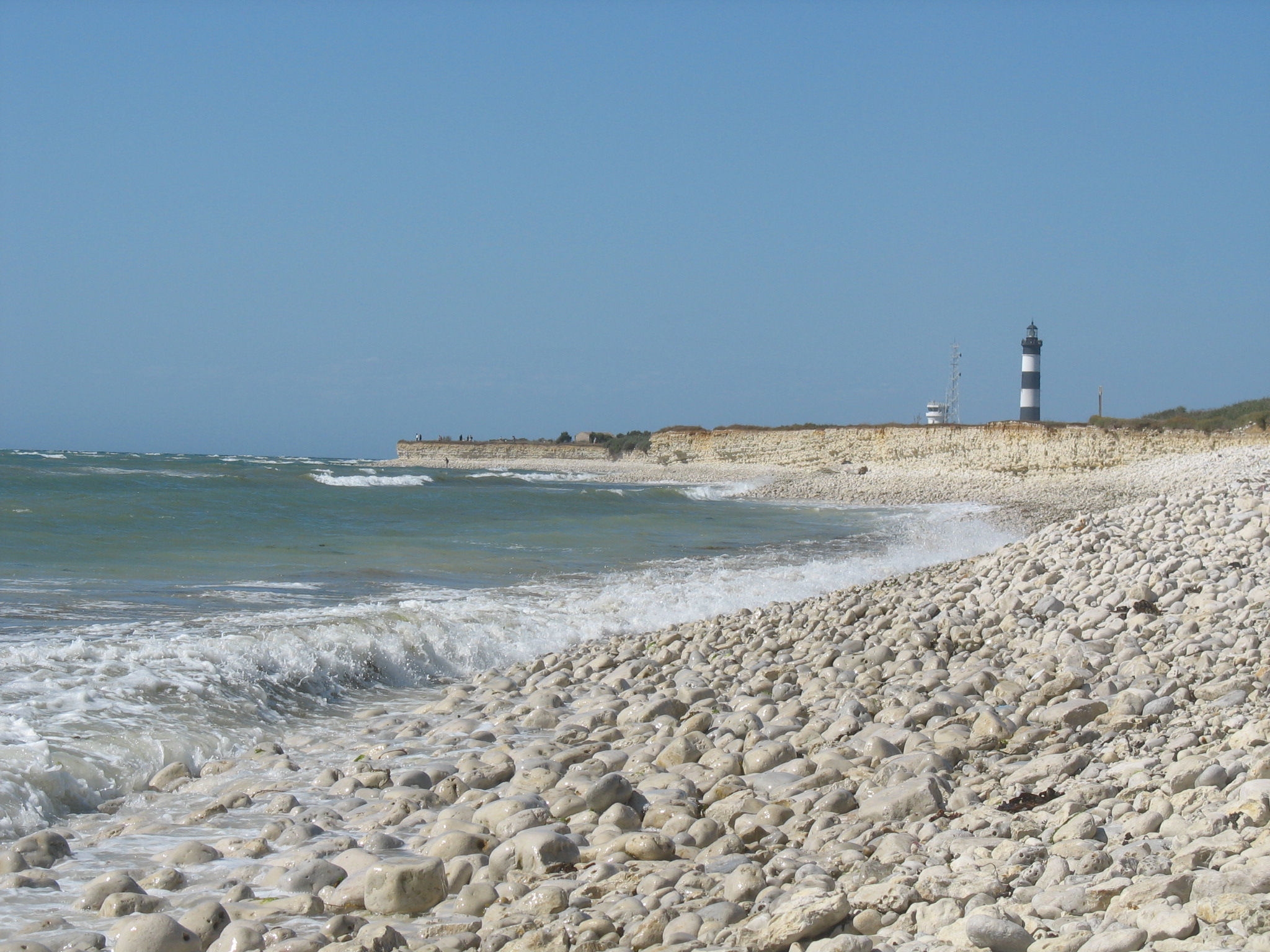
- Chassiron lighthouse

- Coat of arms
- Location of Saint-Denis-d'Oléron
- Location within France Location within Nouvelle-Aquitaine
- Coordinates: 46°02′01″N 1°22′39″W
- Country: France
- Region: Nouvelle-Aquitaine
- Department: Charente-Maritime
- Arrondissement: Rochefort
- Canton: Île d'Oléron
- Intercommunality: Île-d'Oléron

Government
  - Mayor (2020–2026): Joseph Huot
- Area^{1}: 11.75 km^{2} (4.54 sq mi)
- Elevation: 10 m (33 ft)
- Highest elevation: 15 m (49 ft)
- Lowest elevation: 0 m (0 ft)
- Population (2023): 1,358
  - Density: 115.6/km^{2} (299.3/sq mi)
- Time zone: UTC+01:00 (CET)
  - Summer (DST): UTC+02:00 (CEST)
- INSEE/Postal code: 17323 /17650
- ^{1} French Land Register data, which excludes lakes, ponds, glaciers > 1 km^{2} (0.386 sq mi or 247 acres) and river estuaries.

Saint-Denis-d'Oléron (French pronunciation: [sɛ̃ dəni dɔleʁɔ̃], literally Saint-Denis of Oléron, before 1962: Saint-Denis) is a commune on Oléron Island, located in the French department of Charente-Maritime, administrative region of Nouvelle-Aquitaine (before 2015: Poitou-Charentes).

== Geography ==
The town of Saint-Denis d'Oléron is located at the northern end of the Île d'Oléron, in the northwest of the Charente-Maritime department.

== Activities ==
St. Denis-d'Oléron is the northernmost town of the island. As a result, the town has managed to retain an environment in which nature, authenticity and recreation are in perfect harmony.

Among the local activities are: swimming for families on Boirie beach (which is lined with multicolored cabins), sports on the beach, bike trails along the coastline, walks on the marina (with assured access to local gastronomy), sea fishing and boat trips (daily).

The majestic Chassiron lighthouse is near the town, overlooking the Passage of Antioch, with unforgettable views from its summit at 46 meters.

== Population ==
Historical population
Year	Pop.	±% p.a.
1968	901	—
1975	951	+0.77%
1982	1,004	+0.78%
1990	1,107	+1.23%
1999	1,221	+1.10%
2007	1,231	+0.10%
2012	1,364	+2.07%
2017	1,320	−0.65%
2023	1,358	+0.47%
Source: INSEE

== See also ==
- Communes of the Charente-Maritime department
