= Saint-Trojan-les-Bains =

- Commune
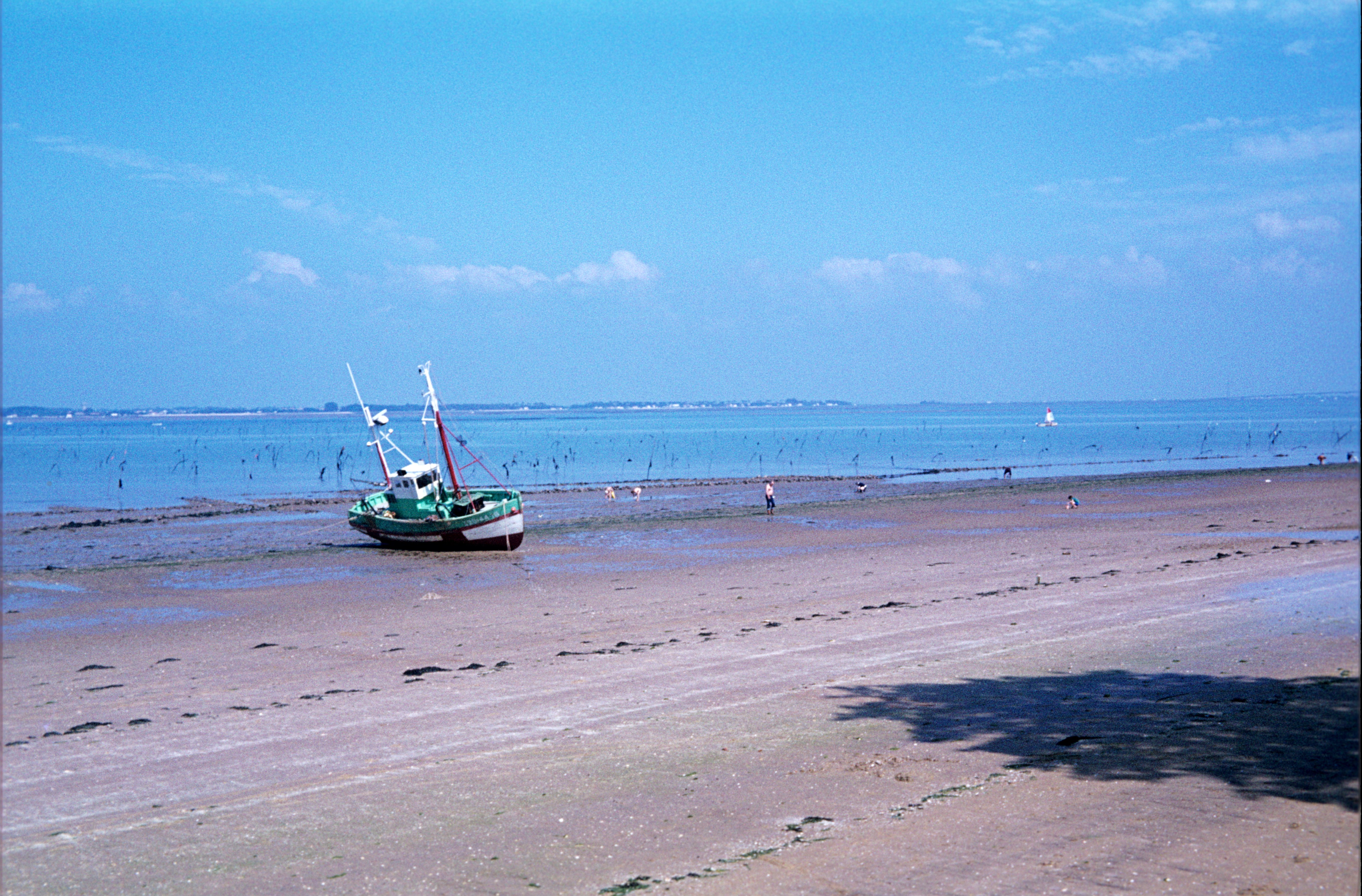
- A beached fishing boat in Saint-Trojan-les-Bains

- Coat of arms
- Location of Saint-Trojan-les-Bains
- Location within France Location within Nouvelle-Aquitaine
- Coordinates: 45°50′32″N 1°12′25″W
- Country: France
- Region: Nouvelle-Aquitaine
- Department: Charente-Maritime
- Arrondissement: Rochefort
- Canton: Île d'Oléron
- Intercommunality: Île-d'Oléron

Government
  - Mayor (2020–2026): Marie-Josée Villautreix
- Area^{1}: 17.53 km^{2} (6.77 sq mi)
- Elevation: 8 m (26 ft)
- Highest elevation: 35 m (115 ft)
- Lowest elevation: 0 m (0 ft)
- Population (2023): 1,121
  - Density: 63.95/km^{2} (165.6/sq mi)
- Time zone: UTC+01:00 (CET)
  - Summer (DST): UTC+02:00 (CEST)
- INSEE/Postal code: 17411 /17370
- ^{1} French Land Register data, which excludes lakes, ponds, glaciers > 1 km^{2} (0.386 sq mi or 247 acres) and river estuaries.

Saint-Trojan-les-Bains (French pronunciation: [sɛ̃ tʁɔʒɑ̃ le bɛ̃]) is a commune in the Charente-Maritime department in southwestern France. It is situated in the south of the island Oléron.

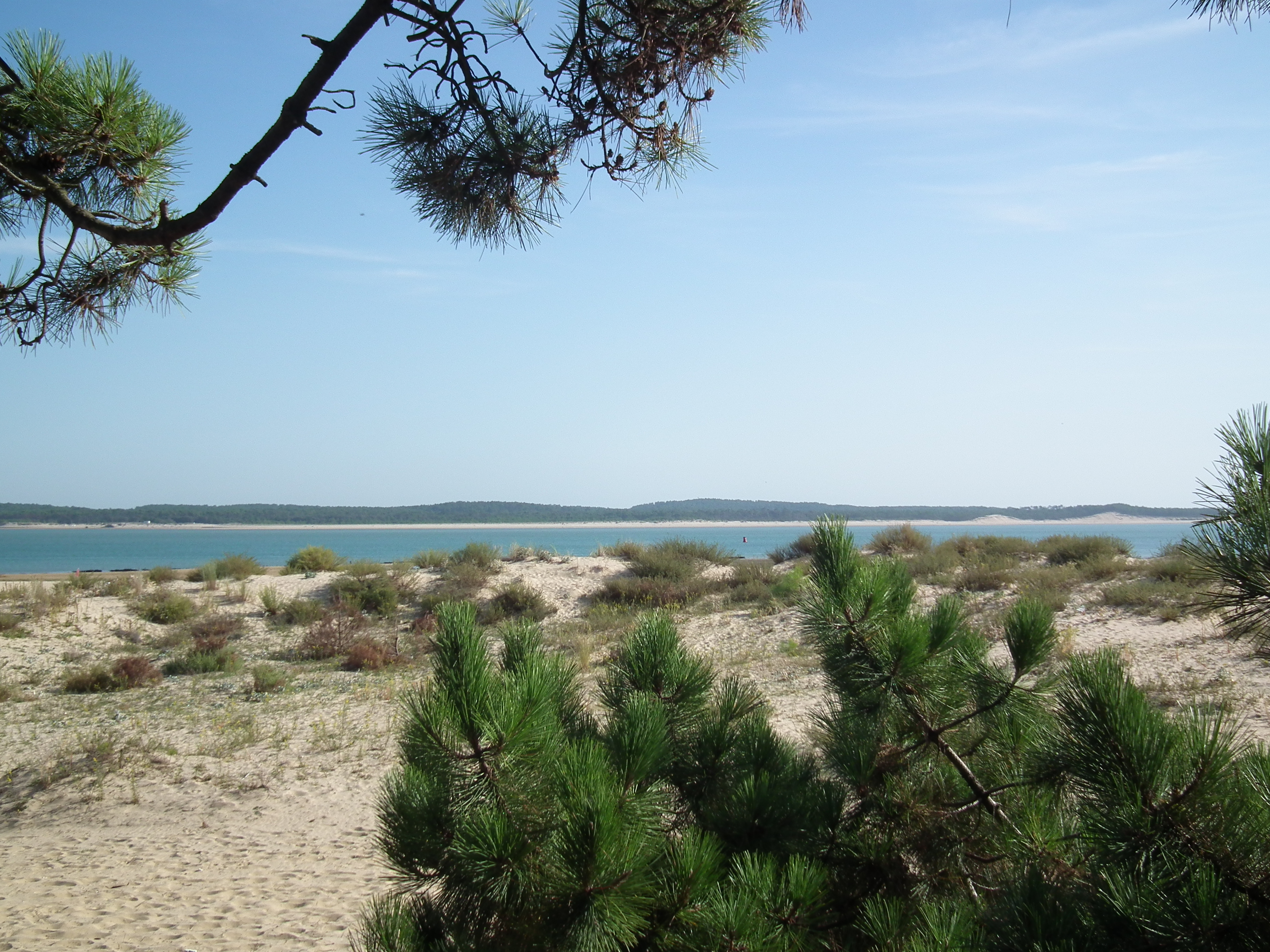
A beach in Saint-Trojan-les-Bains

== Population ==
Historical population
Year	Pop.	±% p.a.
1968	1,666	—
1975	1,488	−1.60%
1982	1,275	−2.18%
1990	1,490	+1.97%
1999	1,624	+0.96%
2007	1,484	−1.12%
2012	1,423	−0.84%
2017	1,262	−2.37%
2023	1,121	−1.96%
Source: INSEE

== See also ==
- Communes of the Charente-Maritime department
