= Oléron =

French coastal island

Isle of Oléron
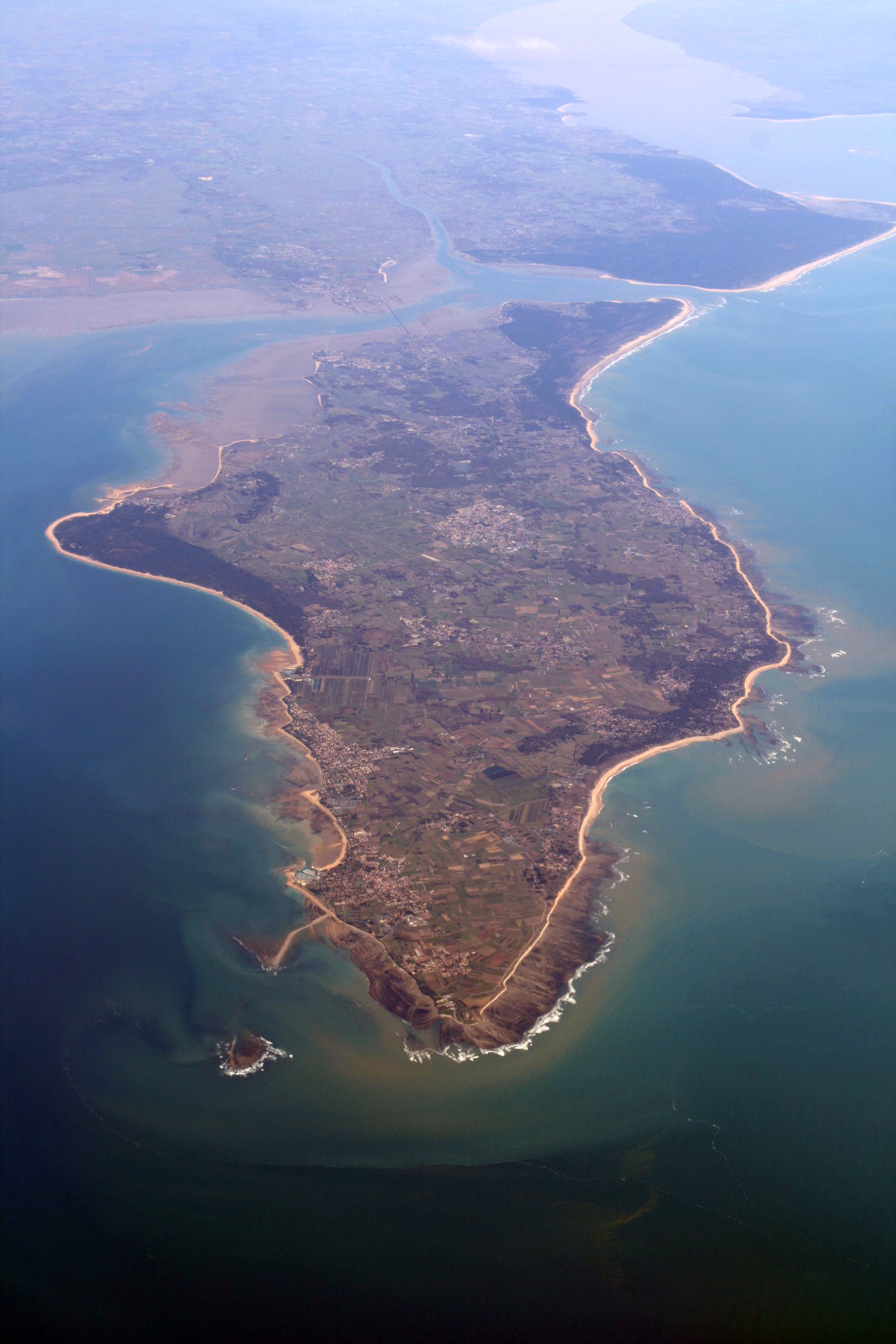
- Aerial photograph of Oléron

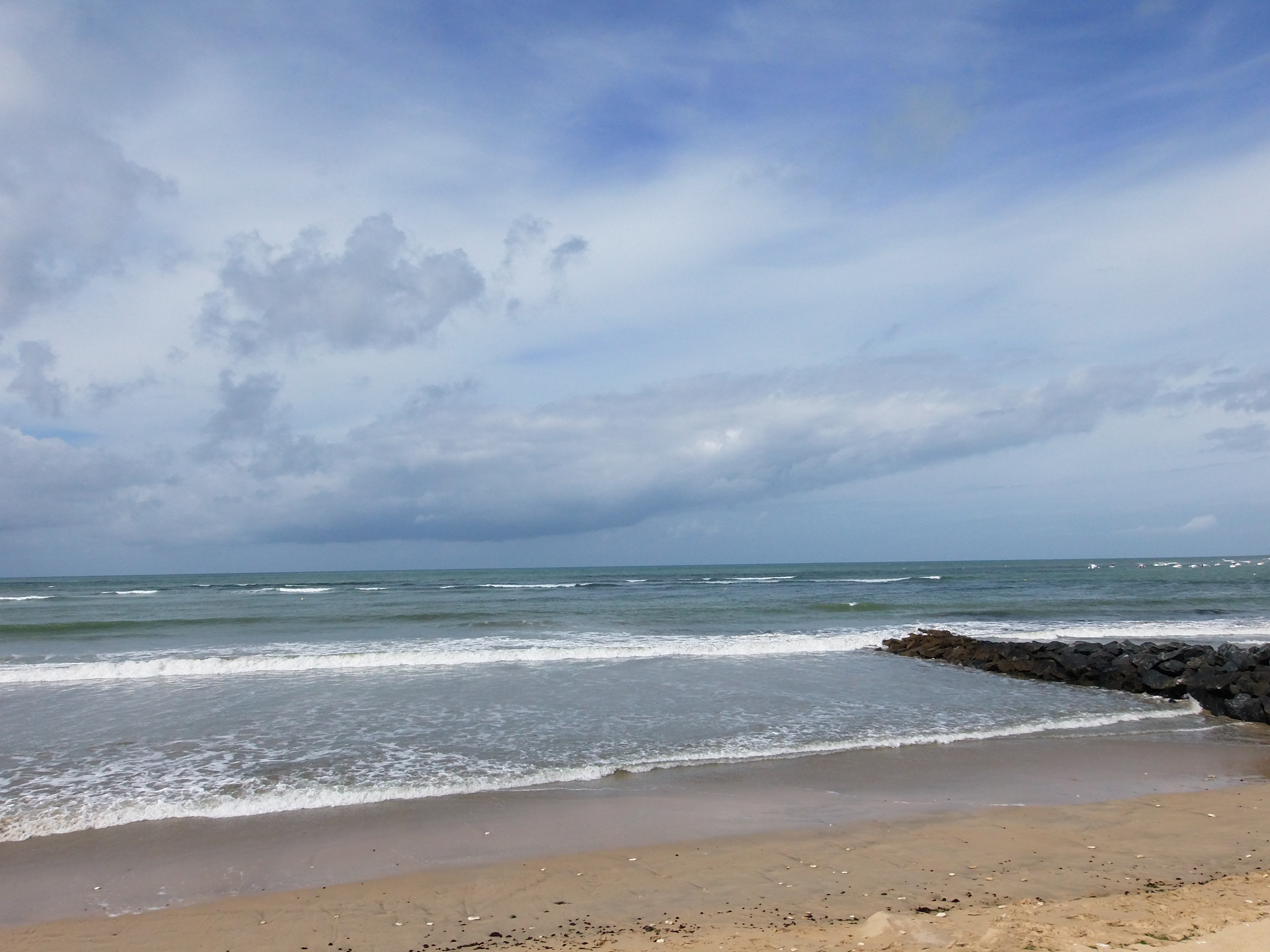
- Vert bois Beach in the southwest of the island

- Location within Poitou-Charentes

Geography
- Location: Atlantic Ocean
- Coordinates: 45°55′30″N 1°16′57″W
- Area: 174 km^{2} (67 sq mi)
- Length: 30 km (19 mi)
- Width: 8 km (5 mi)
- Highest elevation: 34 m (112 ft)

Administration
- France
- Administrative region: New Aquitaine
- Department: Charente-Maritime
- Arrondissement: Rochefort
- Largest settlement: Saint-Pierre-d'Oléron (pop. 6,687)

Demographics
- Demonym: Oléronais(e)
- Population: 21,871 (2010)
- Pop. density: 126/km^{2} (326/sq mi)
- Ethnic groups: French

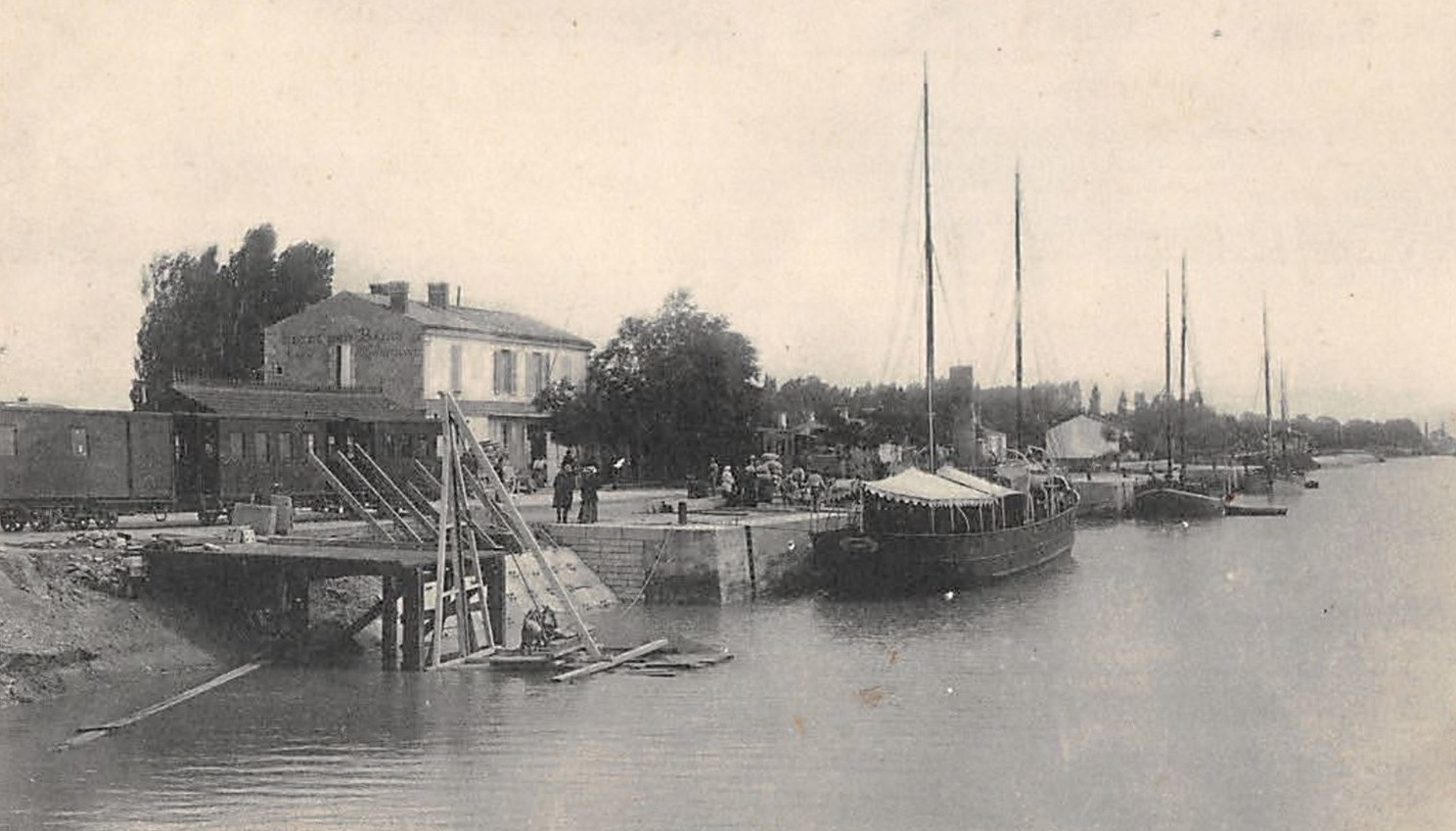
Boyardville in 1910 (port in the north of Oléron island)

The Isle of Oléron or Oléron Island (French: île d'Oléron [il dɔleʁɔ̃], or simply Oléron [ɔleʁɔ̃]; Poitevin-Saintongese: ile d'Olerun or ilâte d'Olerun; Latin: Uliaros insula [uliˈaːros ˈinsula]) is an island off the Atlantic coast of France (due west of Rochefort), on the southern side of the Pertuis d'Antioche strait.

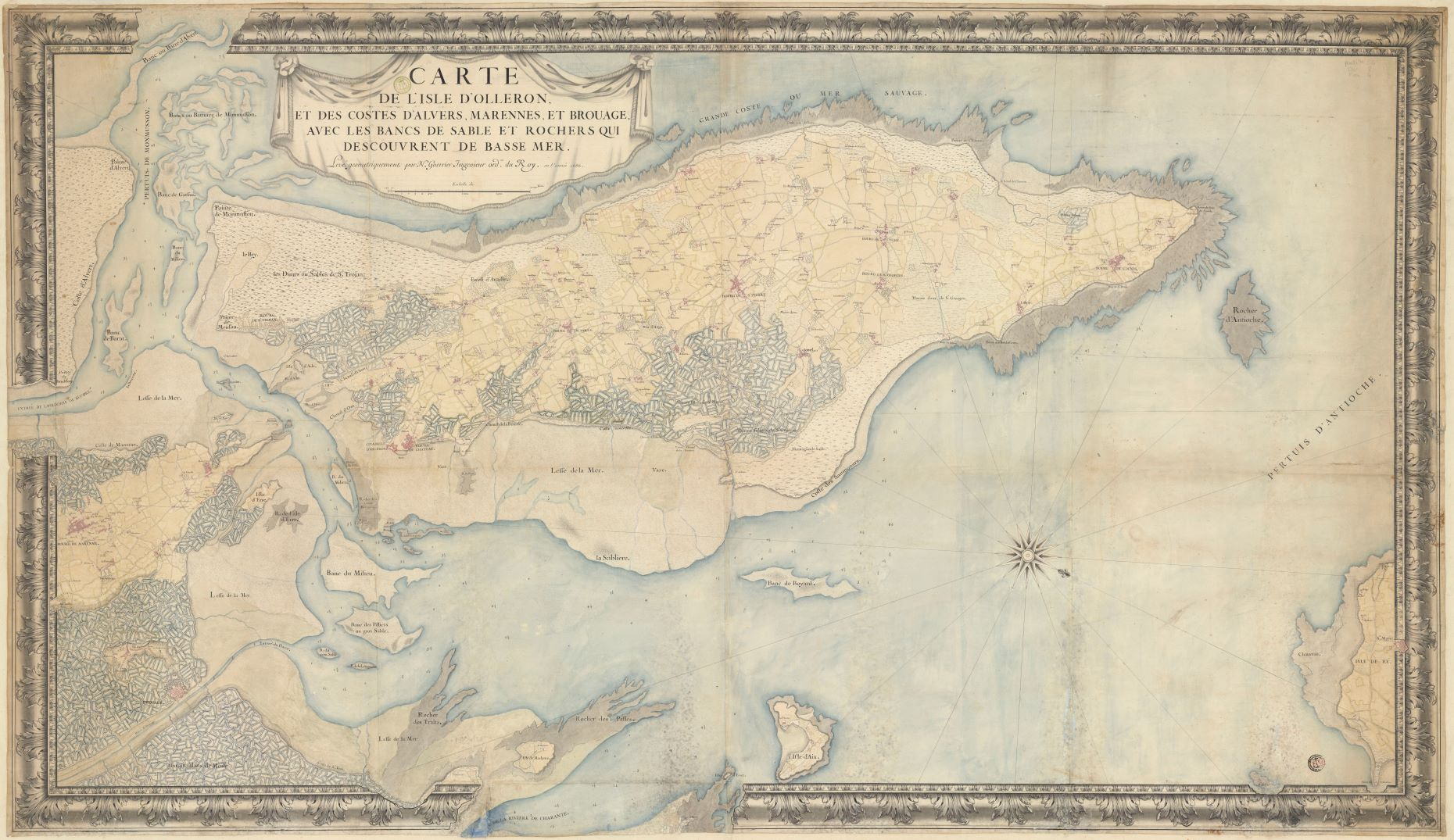
1686 map of Oléron

It is the second largest island of metropolitan France, after Corsica, with a length of 30 km (19 mi) and a width of 8 km (5 mi). It has an area of 174 km^{2} (67 sq. mi.) and more than 21,000 permanent inhabitants.

== History ==
Oléron has been known since the 1st century, where Pliny the Elder refers to it in his Natural History as Uliaros ("in aquitanico sinu Vliaros").

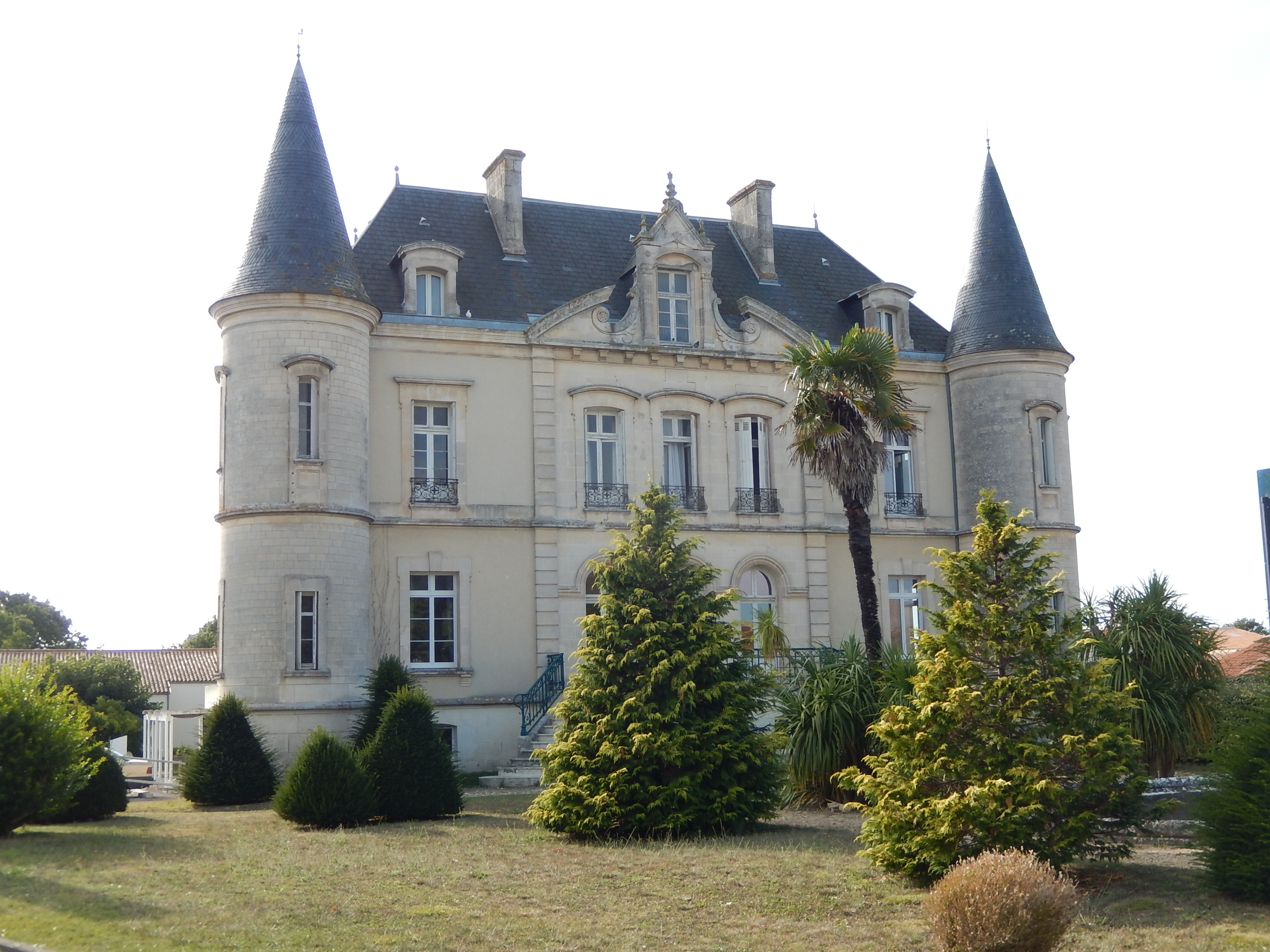
Château Fournier, located in Saint-Georges d'Oléron, bears witness to the island's wine-growing past. Today, it has been transformed into a retirement home.

Towards the end of the 3rd century, the Roman emperor Probus extended the privilege of owning vineyards and producing wine to all Gauls, and this led to a culture of winemaking developing on the island. This lasted until the end of the 19th century, when the arrival of phylloxera decimated almost all the vines. The vineyards did not recover, and grape production today is mainly for Cognac bois ordinaires.

In the 7th and 8th centuries, the island, along with Ré, formed the Vacetae Insulae or Vacetian Islands, according to the Cosmographia. Vaceti was another name for the Vascones; the reference is seen as evidence of Basque (Gascon) control of the islands by that time.

It was at Oléron in about 1152 to 1160 that Eleanor of Aquitaine introduced the first 'maritime' or 'admiralty' laws in that part of the world: the Rolls of Oléron. In 1306, Edward I of England granted the island to his son, Edward II, as part of the Duchy of Aquitaine.

In 1793, during the French Revolution, the villages of the isle of Oléron were renamed. The Château d'Oléron became "Equality", Saint-Trojan became "La Montagne", Dolus became "Sans-Culotte", Saint-Pierre became "La Fraternité" and Saint-Georges became "L'Unité". The overall territory of Oléron became the island of Liberty. A few years later, the original names were given back to the villages and towns.

During the Second World War, the island was occupied by German forces and fortified. It was liberated by Free French Forces in an amphibious assault code-named Operation Jupiter on 29 April 1945. The French cruiser Duquesne fired 550 heavy shells at the German artillery batteries, and the garrison surrendered on the following day.

The isle of Oléron is known today for the quality of its oyster production.

On 5 November 2025, a driver deliberately drove into a crowd of pedestrians and cyclists while shouting "Allahu Akbar" in Dolus-d'Oléron, injuring at least five people, including two critically.

== Geography and climate ==
Map of Oléron

The island has an area of about 174 km^{2} (67 sq mi). It is a fertile and well cultivated island on the Atlantic coast of France, that is on the Bay of Biscay.

The climate is generally mild (maritime temperate) with sufficient but not excessive rainfall, but with probably from 3 to 15 days of intense heat in the summer months of July and August, mostly grouped.

Oléron is located on the sunniest part of the French Atlantic coast, receiving more than 2100 hours of sunshine per year.

Climate data for Île d'Oléron (Chassiron), 1981–2010 normals, extremes 1884–present
Month	Jan	Feb	Mar	Apr	May	Jun	Jul	Aug	Sep	Oct	Nov	Dec	Year
Record high °C (°F)	17.2 (63.0)	20.4 (68.7)	23.4 (74.1)	26.7 (80.1)	31.2 (88.2)	35.6 (96.1)	35.0 (95.0)	35.9 (96.6)	32.8 (91.0)	28.8 (83.8)	21.2 (70.2)	18.6 (65.5)	35.9 (96.6)
Mean daily maximum °C (°F)	9.3 (48.7)	9.8 (49.6)	12.3 (54.1)	14.4 (57.9)	17.8 (64.0)	20.7 (69.3)	22.5 (72.5)	22.7 (72.9)	21.0 (69.8)	17.6 (63.7)	13.1 (55.6)	10.1 (50.2)	16.0 (60.8)
Daily mean °C (°F)	7.3 (45.1)	7.6 (45.7)	9.8 (49.6)	11.7 (53.1)	15.0 (59.0)	17.9 (64.2)	19.8 (67.6)	20.0 (68.0)	18.2 (64.8)	15.1 (59.2)	10.9 (51.6)	8.0 (46.4)	13.5 (56.3)
Mean daily minimum °C (°F)	5.3 (41.5)	5.3 (41.5)	7.4 (45.3)	9.1 (48.4)	12.3 (54.1)	15.1 (59.2)	17.1 (62.8)	17.3 (63.1)	15.3 (59.5)	12.6 (54.7)	8.7 (47.7)	5.9 (42.6)	11.0 (51.8)
Record low °C (°F)	−10.0 (14.0)	−9.2 (15.4)	−5.2 (22.6)	−0.8 (30.6)	4.6 (40.3)	7.2 (45.0)	10.2 (50.4)	10.0 (50.0)	7.8 (46.0)	1.0 (33.8)	−2.0 (28.4)	−8.8 (16.2)	−10.0 (14.0)
Average precipitation mm (inches)	68.0 (2.68)	51.9 (2.04)	46.9 (1.85)	58.9 (2.32)	50.9 (2.00)	38.7 (1.52)	41.8 (1.65)	37.1 (1.46)	56.8 (2.24)	80.7 (3.18)	87.4 (3.44)	83.7 (3.30)	702.8 (27.67)
Average precipitation days (≥ 1.0 mm)	11.9	9.4	9.2	10.5	9.2	6.6	6.6	5.9	7.4	11.6	12.3	12.9	113.6
Mean monthly sunshine hours	78.8	112.5	155.5	205.7	238.5	252.4	282.2	264.6	195.0	131.7	94.2	68.6	2,079.8
Source 1: Meteociel
Source 2: Météo Climat

Climate data for Île d'Oléron (Château-d'Oléron), 1981–2010 normals, extremes 1989–present
Month	Jan	Feb	Mar	Apr	May	Jun	Jul	Aug	Sep	Oct	Nov	Dec	Year
Record high °C (°F)	16.5 (61.7)	20.3 (68.5)	23.5 (74.3)	29.1 (84.4)	31.0 (87.8)	36.3 (97.3)	37.1 (98.8)	39.0 (102.2)	34.6 (94.3)	29.4 (84.9)	22.7 (72.9)	19.1 (66.4)	39.0 (102.2)
Mean daily maximum °C (°F)	9.6 (49.3)	10.7 (51.3)	13.5 (56.3)	15.6 (60.1)	19.7 (67.5)	22.6 (72.7)	24.5 (76.1)	25.0 (77.0)	22.2 (72.0)	18.1 (64.6)	13.1 (55.6)	9.8 (49.6)	17.1 (62.8)
Daily mean °C (°F)	7.1 (44.8)	7.8 (46.0)	10.2 (50.4)	12.2 (54.0)	16.0 (60.8)	18.8 (65.8)	20.6 (69.1)	21.0 (69.8)	18.4 (65.1)	15.0 (59.0)	10.4 (50.7)	7.3 (45.1)	13.8 (56.8)
Mean daily minimum °C (°F)	4.7 (40.5)	4.9 (40.8)	6.9 (44.4)	8.7 (47.7)	12.3 (54.1)	15.0 (59.0)	16.7 (62.1)	17.0 (62.6)	14.5 (58.1)	12.0 (53.6)	7.8 (46.0)	4.9 (40.8)	10.5 (50.9)
Record low °C (°F)	−6.6 (20.1)	−6.5 (20.3)	−4.6 (23.7)	0.8 (33.4)	5.1 (41.2)	9.6 (49.3)	10.0 (50.0)	11.4 (52.5)	7.7 (45.9)	1.1 (34.0)	−3.7 (25.3)	−7.9 (17.8)	−7.9 (17.8)
Average precipitation mm (inches)	76.5 (3.01)	56.6 (2.23)	55.0 (2.17)	67.0 (2.64)	57.1 (2.25)	42.0 (1.65)	40.6 (1.60)	41.0 (1.61)	64.9 (2.56)	96.0 (3.78)	94.6 (3.72)	93.3 (3.67)	784.6 (30.89)
Average precipitation days (≥ 1 mm)	12.0	9.8	10.2	10.6	9.3	7.1	6.9	6.4	7.6	12.2	12.8	13.1	118.1
Source: Meteociel

== Administration ==
Administratively, the island belongs to the Charente-Maritime département, in the Nouvelle-Aquitaine région. The island is divided into 8 communes:

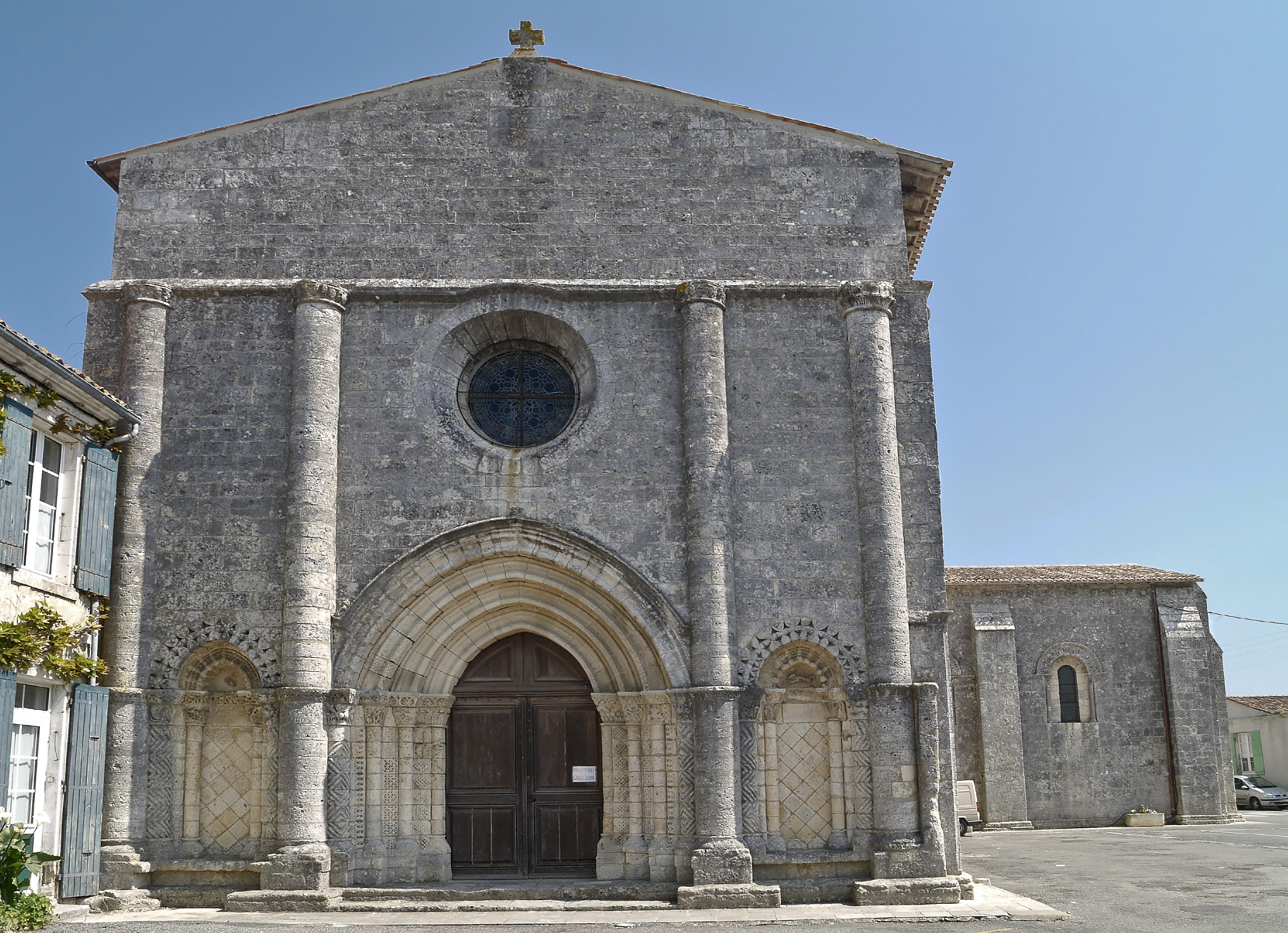
Saint George's church, Oléron

- La Brée-les-Bains
- Le Château-d'Oléron
- Dolus-d'Oléron
- Le Grand-Village-Plage
- Saint-Denis-d'Oléron
- Saint-Georges-d'Oléron (includes Boyardville)
- Saint-Pierre d'Oléron
- Saint-Trojan-les-Bains

The island has about 22,000 inhabitants.

== Transportation ==
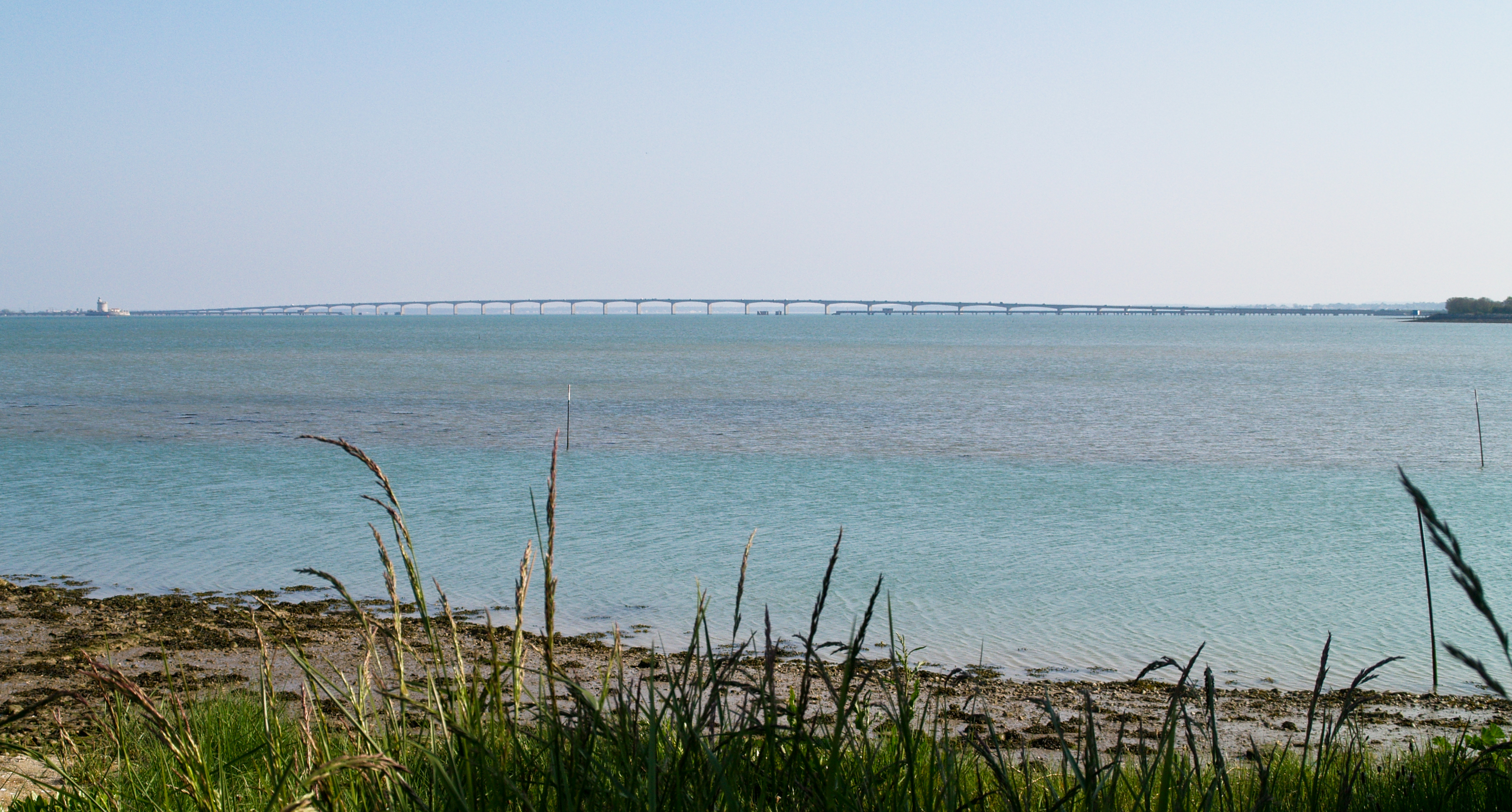
Île d'Oléron bridge, seen from Le Château d'Oléron

Since 1966, the island has been connected to the mainland by a road bridge, the Oléron bridge. With a length of 2,862 m (9,390 ft) between abutments, it was the longest bridge in France at the time of construction. It is now the third one, after the Saint-Nazaire bridge and the Île de Ré bridge. It has been toll-free since 1991.

To get to the island, it is possible to arrive at the stations of Surgères, Saintes or Rochefort, then take the bus. On the island itself, the easiest way to get around is by car or by bicycle. During the last ten years, a network of 110 kilometers (68 miles) of bicycle paths have been built. These bicycle lanes are mostly car-free.

== Tourism ==
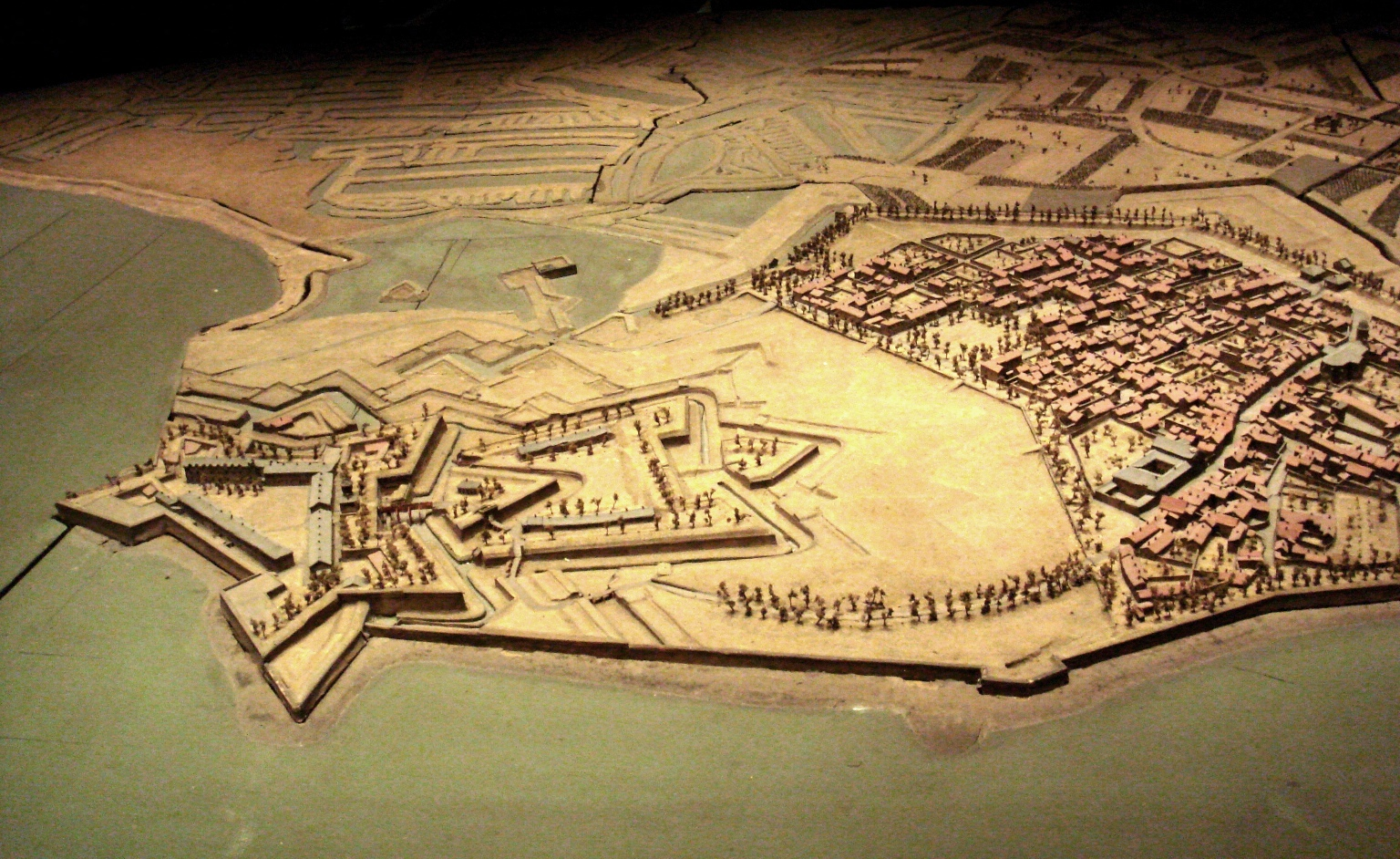
Le Château-d'Oléron, 1703 military mock-up.

As a large Atlantic island only 3 kilometres (2 miles) off the Aquitanian coast of France, Oléron is a popular tourist destination. Several companies operate boat trips from the towns of Boyardville and Saint-Denis to the nearby Île d'Aix, La Rochelle, and past the Fort Boyard. The port towns are frequently visited by tourists, especially the village of La Cotiniere. This village is the base for a hundred trawlers who sell their fish every day at 5 am and 4 pm. La Cotiniere was the first fishing port in the department of Charente-Maritime, and the 8th of France.

== Sources ==
- Collins, Roger. "The Vaccaei, the Vaceti, and the rise of Vasconia." Studia Historica VI. Salamanca, 1988. Reprinted in Roger Collins, Law, Culture and Regionalism in Early Medieval Spain. Variorum, 1992. ISBN 0-86078-308-1.
