= Horti Liciniani =

Set of gardens in ancient Rome

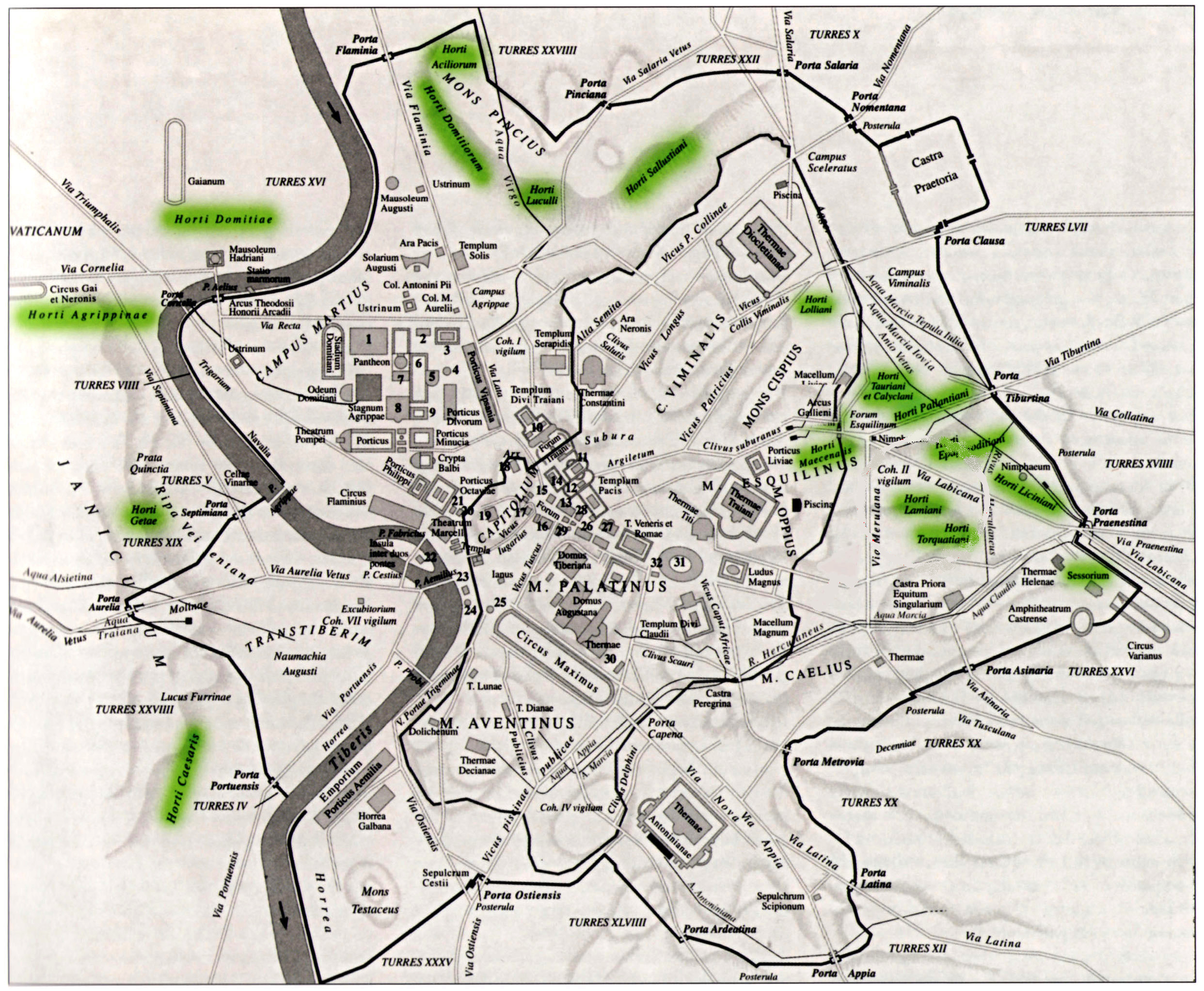
Horti of ancient Rome

The Horti Liciniani was a luxurious complex of an ancient Roman villa with large gardens and outdoor rooms originally belonging to the gens Licinia. It was located in Rome on the Esquiline Hill between via Labicana and via Prenestina, close to the Aurelian Walls. They bordered the Horti Tauriani to the north and the Horti Pallantiani and Horti Epaphroditiani to the west.

== History ==
Lucullus started the fashion of building luxurious garden-palaces in the 1st century BC with the construction of his gardens on the Pincian Hill, soon followed by Sallust's gardens between the Quirinal, Viminal and Campus Martius, which were the largest and richest in the Roman world. In the 3rd century AD the total number of gardens (horti) occupied about a tenth of Rome and formed a green belt around the centre. The horti were a place of pleasure, almost a small palace, and offered the rich owner and his court the possibility of living in isolation, away from the hectic life of the city but close to it. A fundamental feature of the horti was the large quantity of water necessary for the rich vegetation and for the functioning of the numerous fountains and nymphaea. The area was particularly suitable for these residences as eight of the eleven large aqueducts of the city reached the Esquiline.

The Horti Liciniani took their name from the Licinia family (gens), who owned them. In the 3rd century, the Horti Liciani were owned by the Emperor Licinius Gallienus, himself a member of the gens. Latin historians say that the emperor loved to reside here with his entire court, which indicates that it must have been a very large and rich complex.

On the top of the Esquiline Hill Gallienus planned to erect a colossal statue depicting himself in the guise of the invincible Sun god, but the work was never completed. The arcus Gallieni (Arch of Gallienus) still stands at the Esquiline gate. The Palatium Licinianum (palace) stood near the site of the present church of Santa Balbina.

The 4th-century domed nymphaeum that survives, long miscalled a "Temple of Minerva Medica", is believed to have been part of the gardens.

== Excavations ==
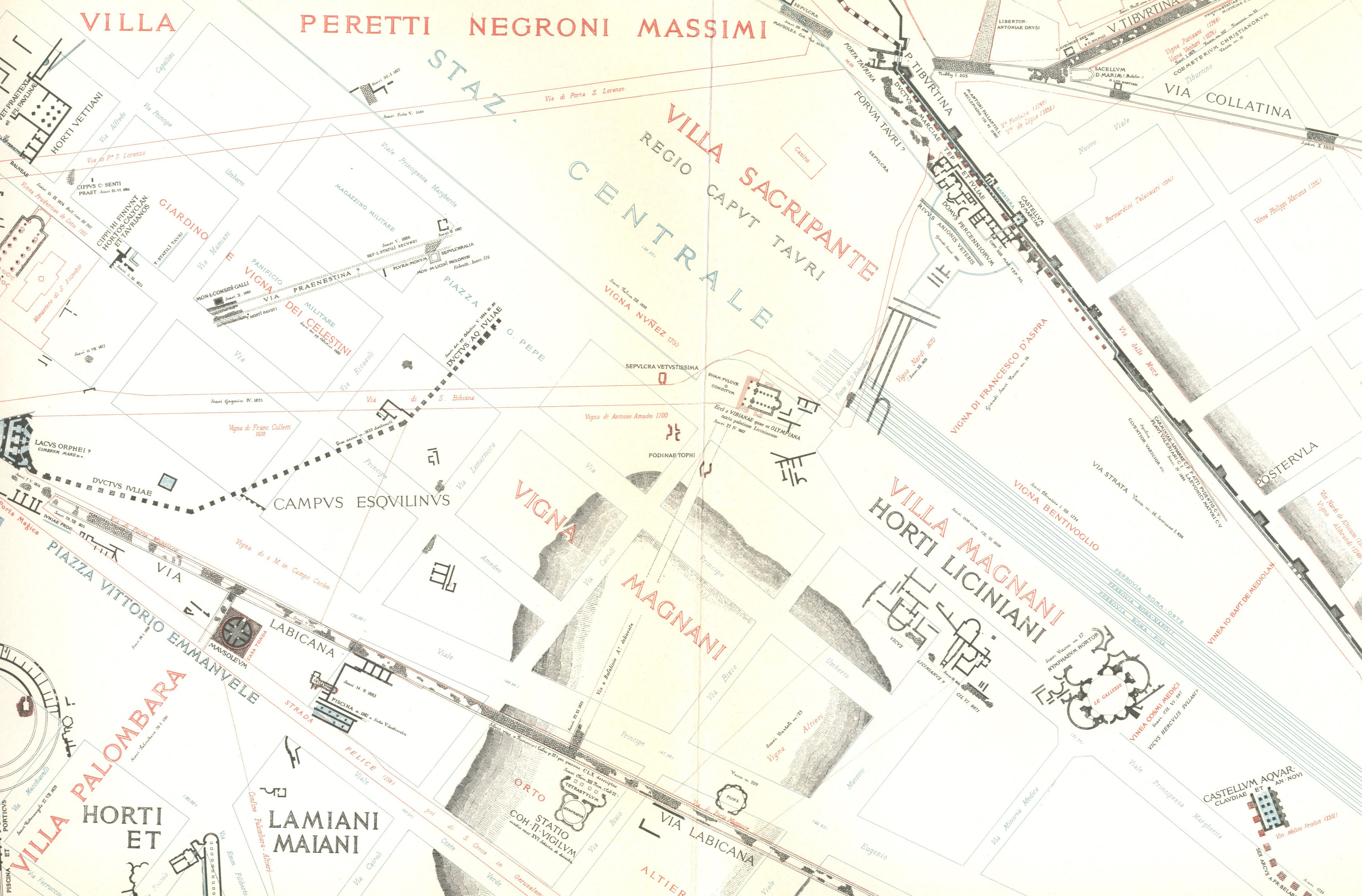
Map of excavations, 1901 (Lanciani)

Various artistic finds and statues have been found in the area starting from the 16th century, confirming the vast artistic collection of the Horti Liciniani. These included Venus, Aesclepius and one of Athena (thought to be Minerva) with the snake (symbol of medicine) from which the name derives.

Between 1875 and 1878 the feverish post-unification development of Rome into an urban capital city and of the new Esquiline district revealed ancient buildings, perhaps belonging to the palace, near the nymphaeum, as recorded by Rodolfo Lanciani. A number of remarkable sculptures earlier than the nymphaeum were found reused in and around it, notable of which are statues of two magistrates launching the circus games, perhaps Quintus Aurelius Symmachus and his son Memmius Simmacus (in the Palazzo dei Conservatori), who were important in late 4th century Rome. Others are a bust of Manlia Scantilla, wife of the emperor Didius Julianus, some capitals with columns and Bacchic reliefs and a relief with the "forge of Vulcan".

In 1904 a large mosaic floor with hunting scenes belonging to a long portico of the horti and dated to the early 4th century was found during the construction of the railway underpass. It was in excellent condition, but only 3/5 was removed because the rest remained under the railway tracks. It remained in a warehouse for decades and was "rediscovered" recently and since 1997 it has been exhibited in the Centrale Montemartini museum.

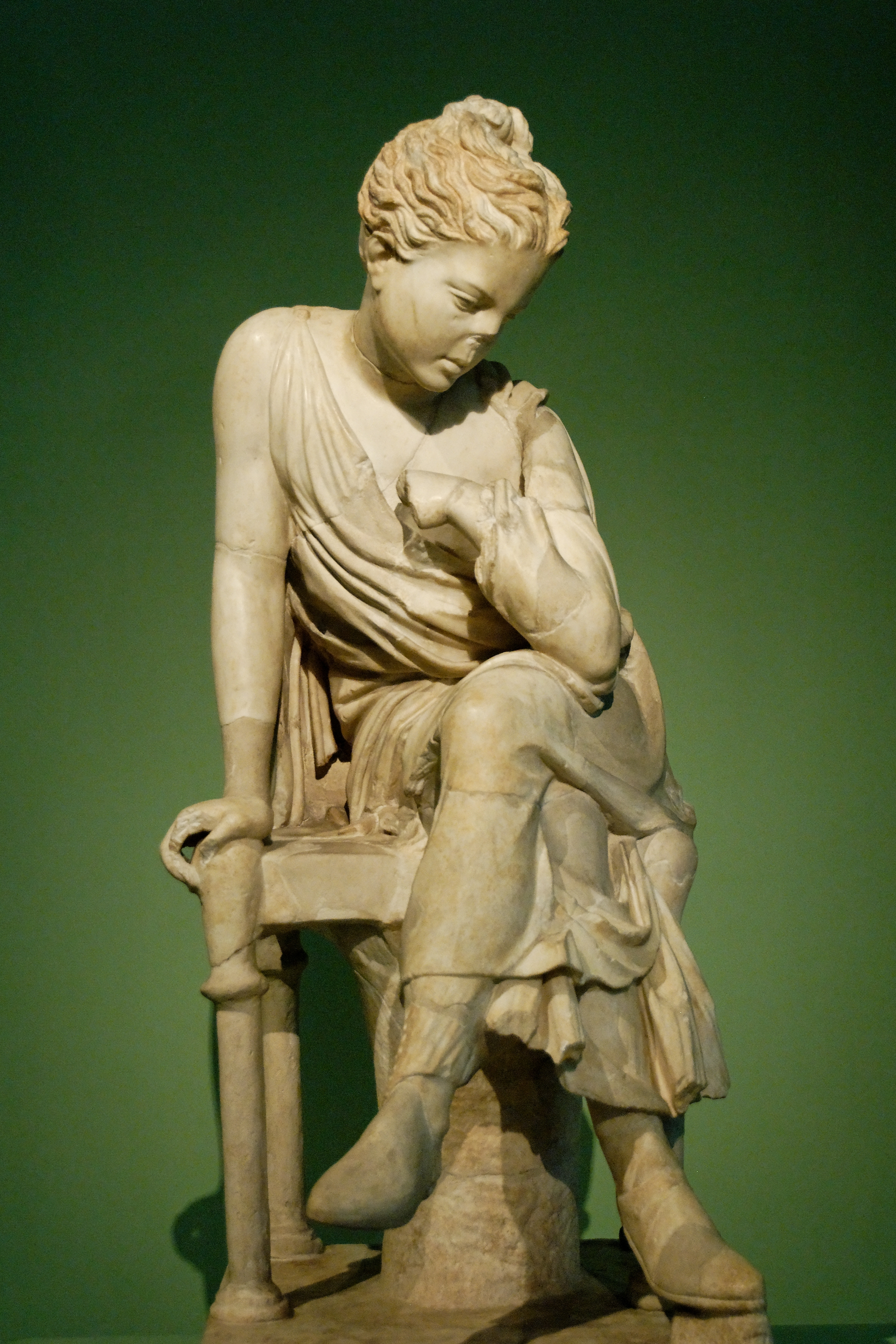
Sitting girl from the nymphaeum

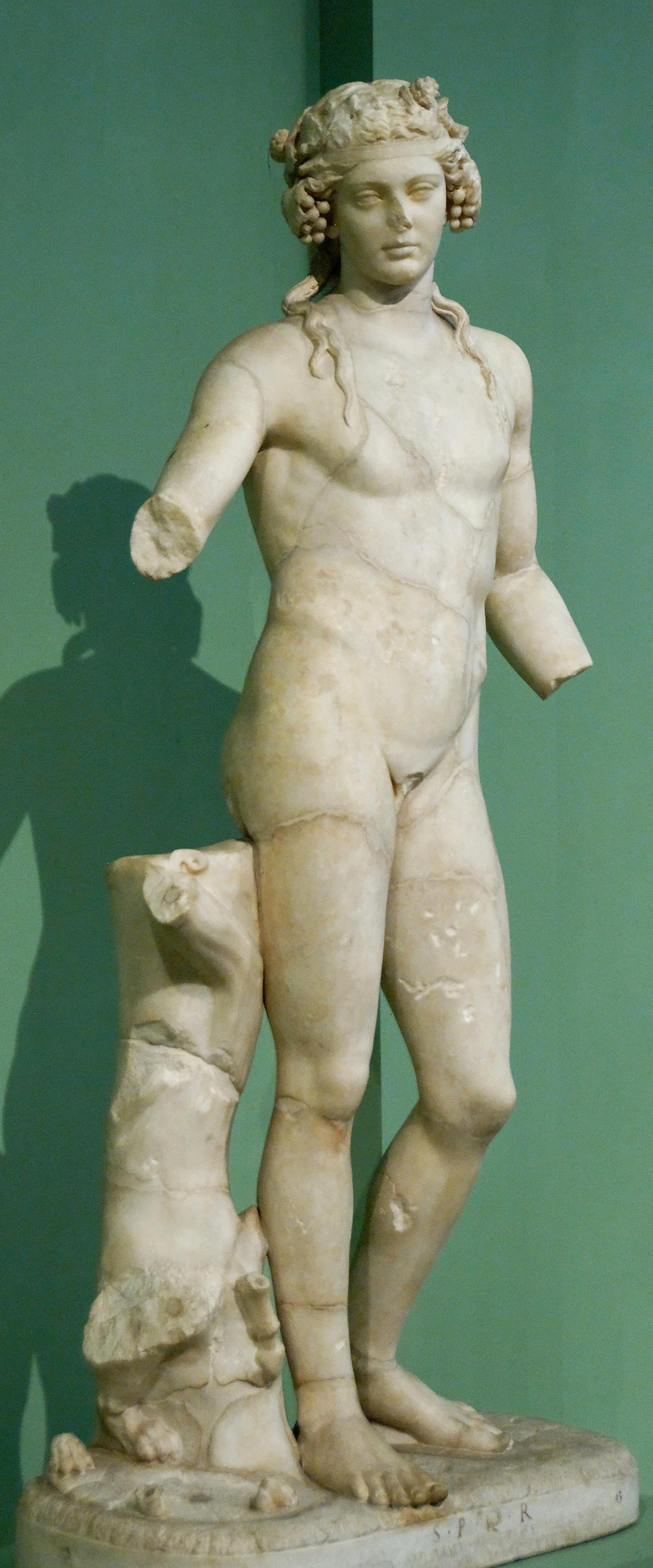
Dionysus of Pentelic marble discovered 1879 (Capitoline Museums)

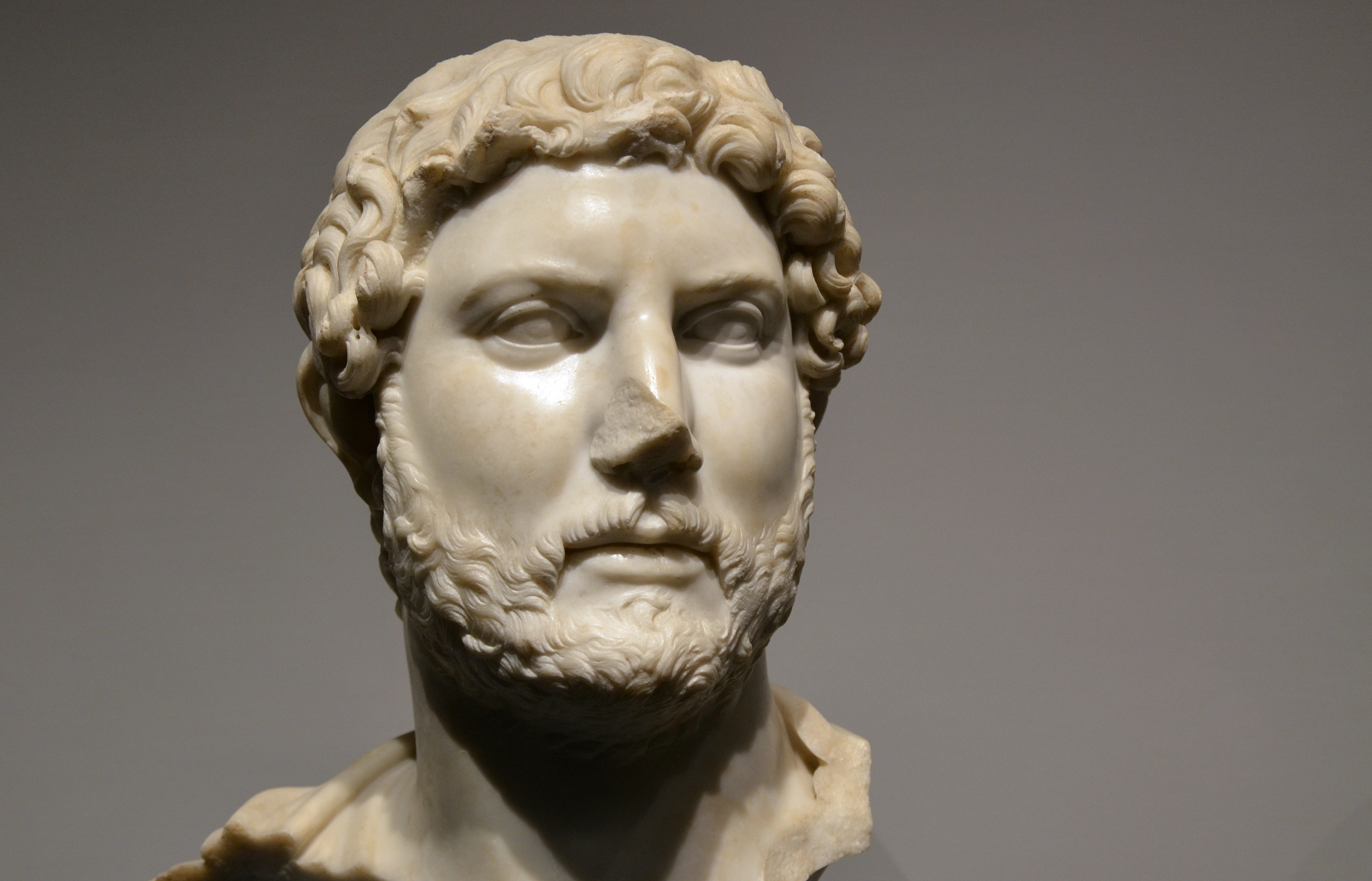
Bust of Hadrian, 117-120 AD (Palazzo Massimo alle Terme)

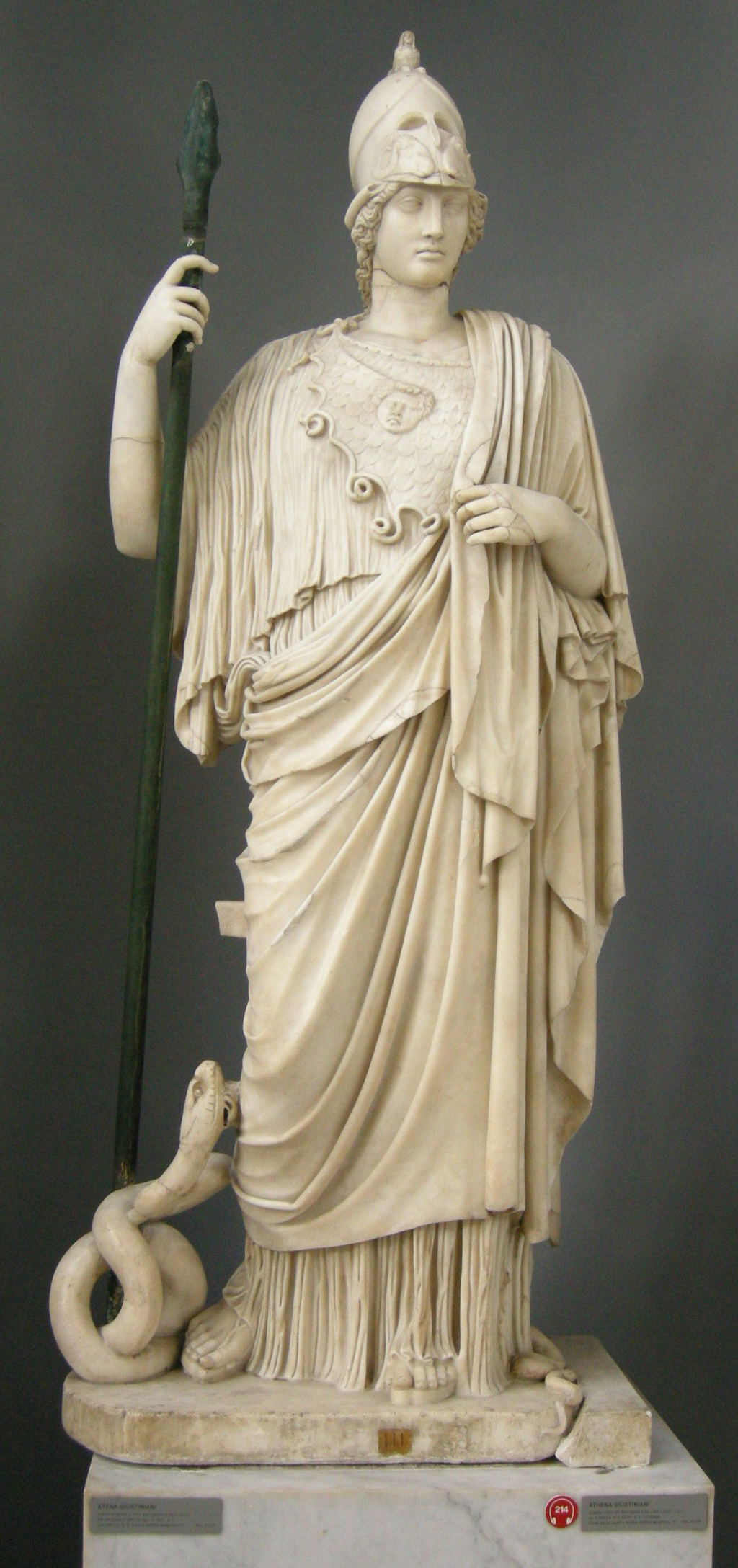
Athena Giustiniani

== See also ==
- Roman gardens
