= Horti Tauriani =

Gardens of ancient Rome

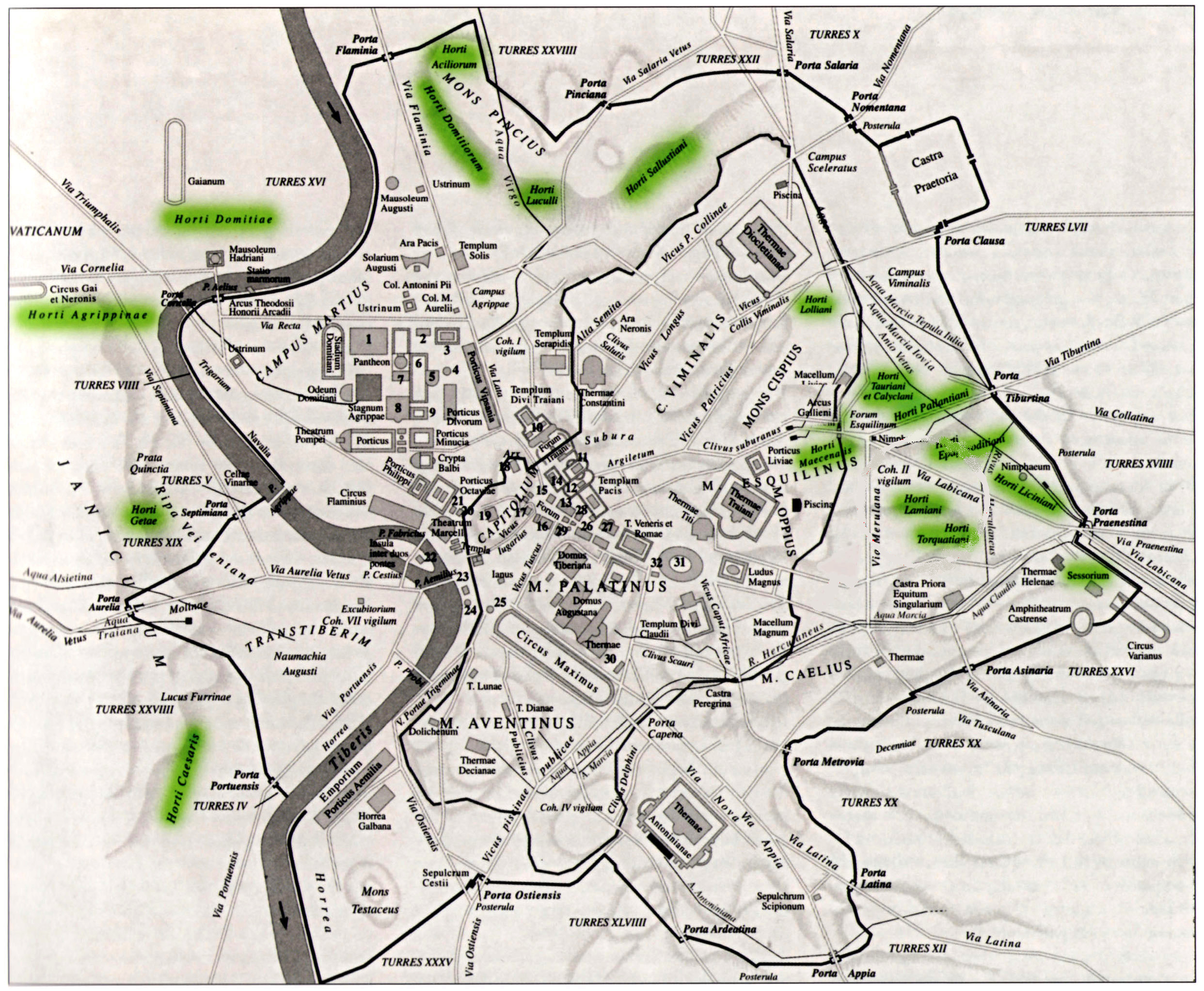
Horti of ancient Rome

The Horti Tauriani (Latin for ‘Taurian gardens’) were a large set of gardens in ancient Rome around the residence of Statilius Taurus, an eminent character of the 1st century CE. They were perhaps the motive for his conviction on a charge of sorcery, which allowed Agrippina to confiscate them and add them to the imperial estates. At the time of Claudius and Nero, the gardens were divided into Horti Pallantiani and Horti Epaphroditiani, named after the imperial freedmen Epaphroditus and Pallantus to whom they were given.

The gardens were partly reunited under Gallienus in the mid 3rd century with the imperial Horti Liciniani, but began to split again in late antiquity, being centred round the residence of Vettius Agorius Praetextatus as the Horti Vettiani.

From this area come numerous attributable sculptures from the gardens' different phases: statues of deities, decorative reliefs, two large marble craters, and three splendid portraits of Hadrian, Sabina, and Matidia.

== Gallery ==
Works from the horti:

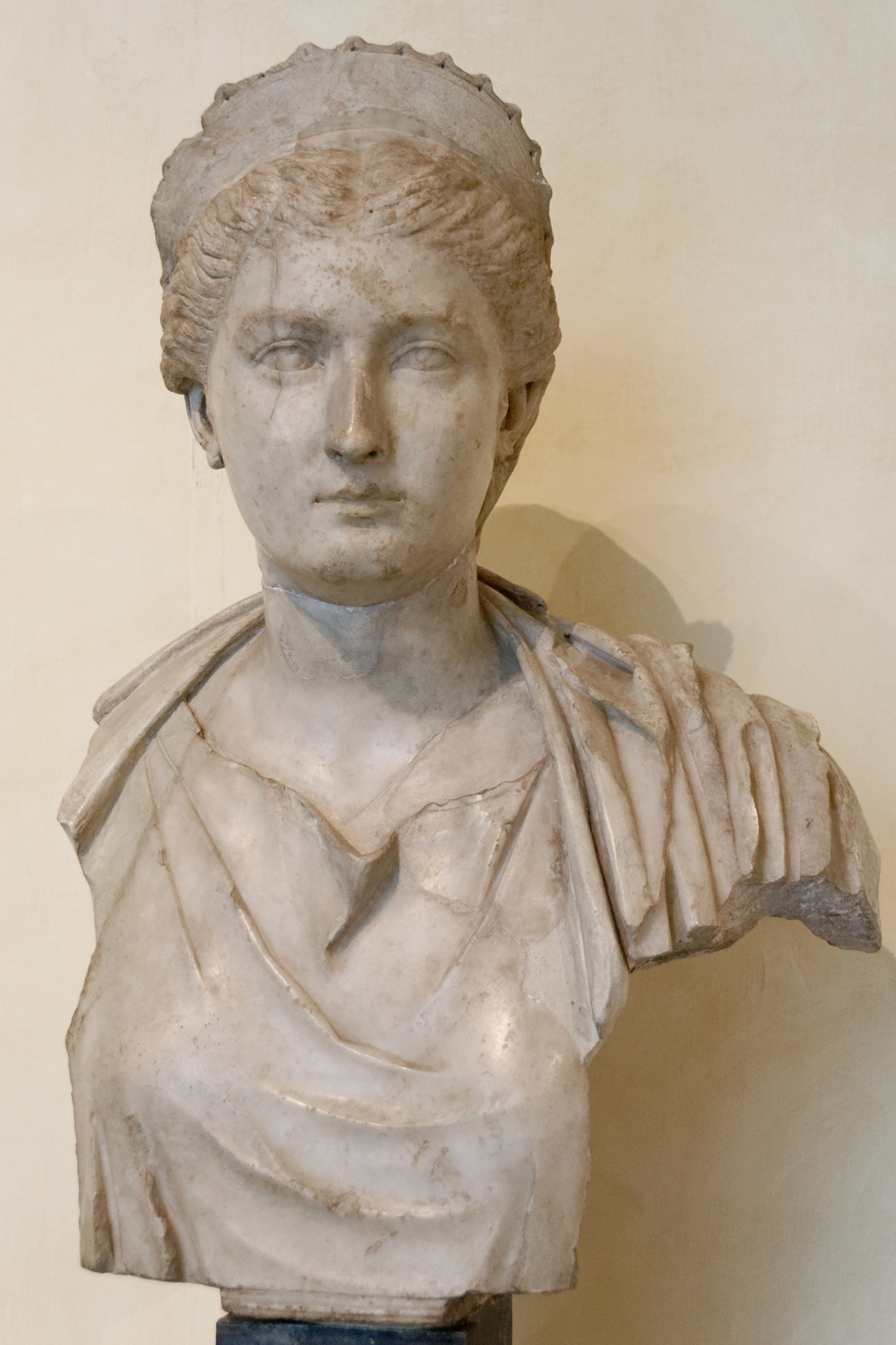
Vibia Sabina wife of Hadrian (Musei Capitolini)

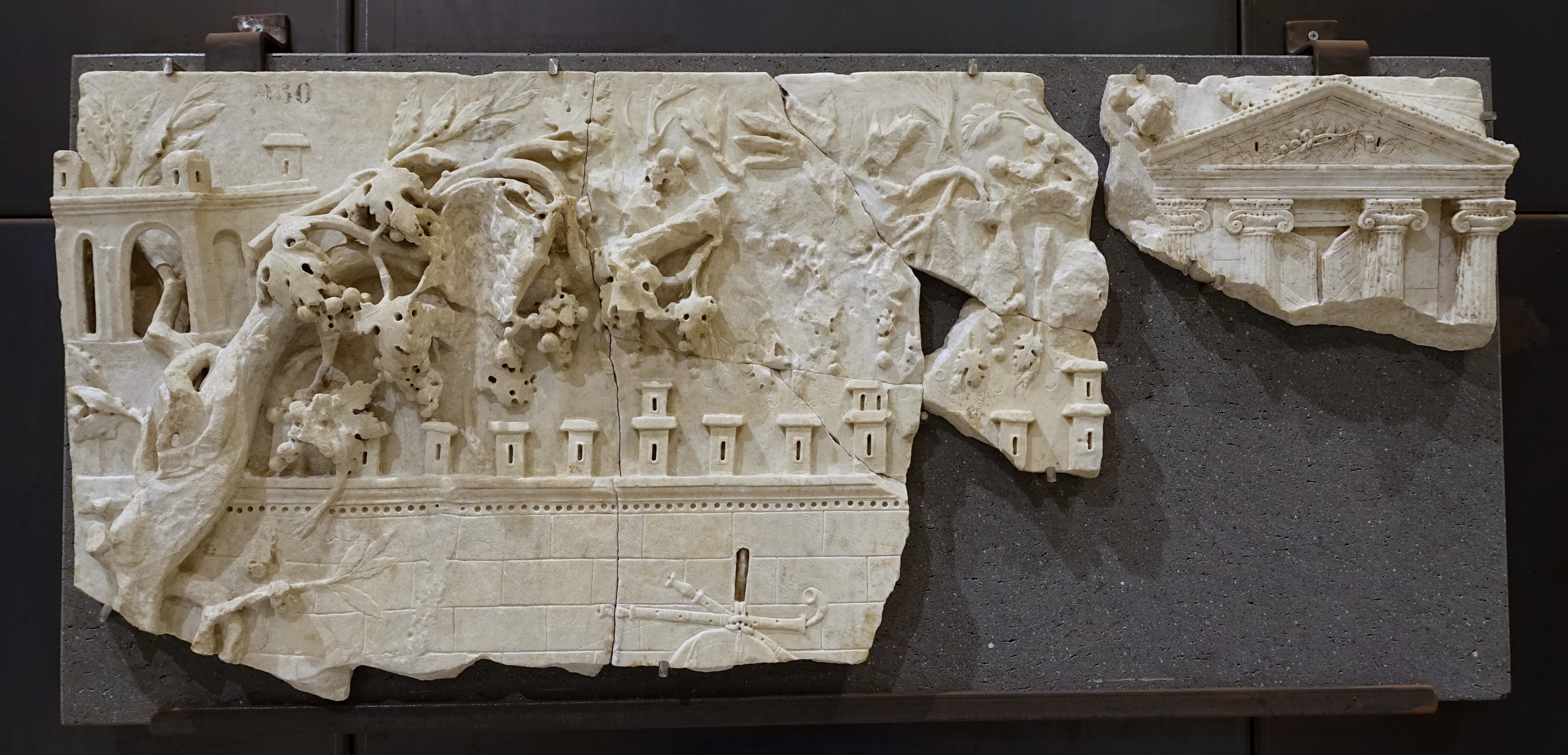
Marble (Musei Capitolini)

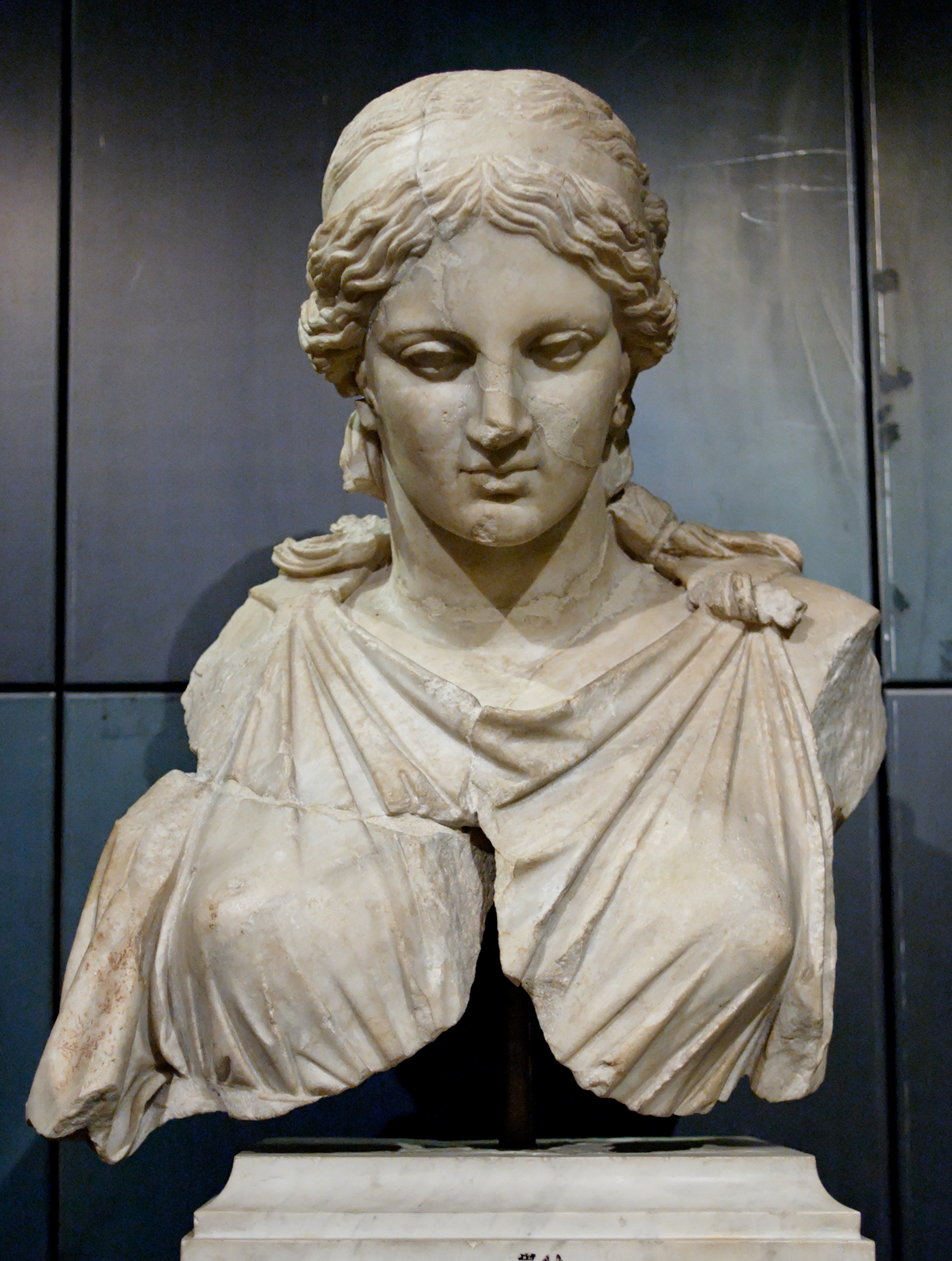
Artemis Kephisodotos (Musei Capitolini)

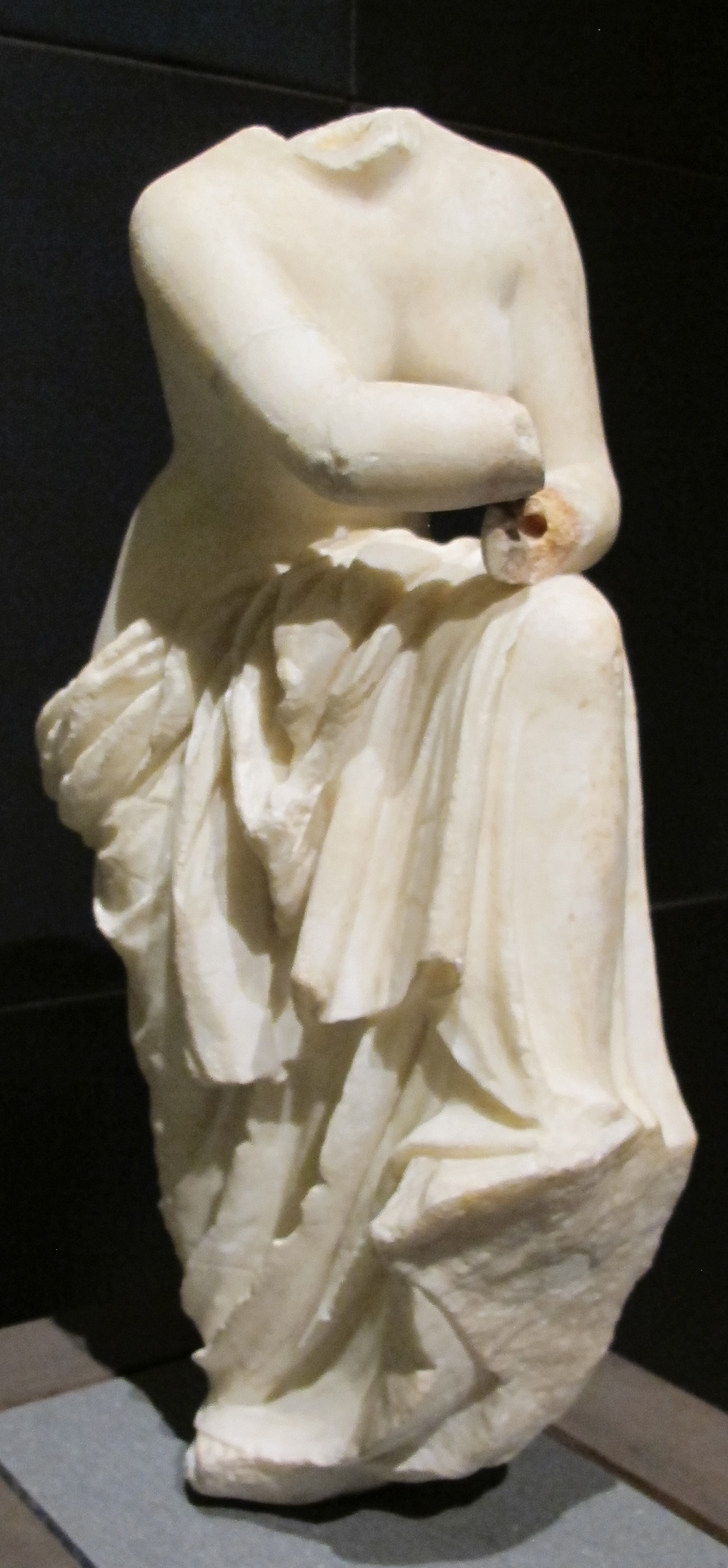
Nymph

== See also ==
- Roman gardens
