= Temple of Minerva Medica (nymphaeum) =

Ancient religious monument in Rome, Italy

- Nymphaeum Hortorum Licinianorum (Latin)
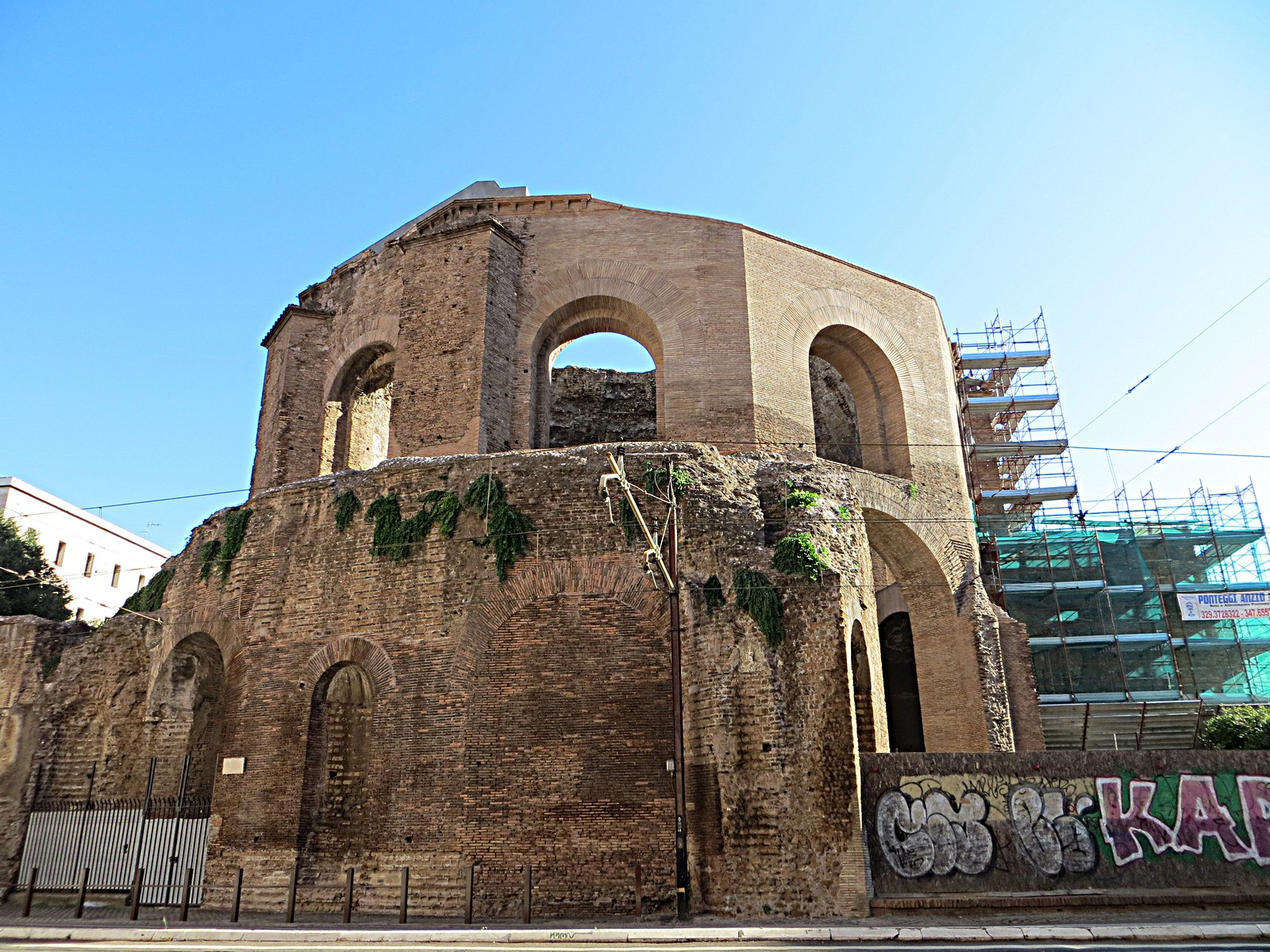
- The surviving decagonal brick ruins of the nymphaeum facing Via Giolitti.

- Shown within Late Imperial Rome
- Interactive map of Temple of Minerva Medica
- 41°53′38″N 12°30′43″E
- Location: Rome, Italy

History
- Built: c. 300–325 CE

Site notes
- Area: Esquiline Hill (Horti Liciniani)

The Temple of Minerva Medica is a ruined nymphaeum of Imperial Rome which dates to the late 3rd or early 4th century AD. It is located between the Via Labicana and Aurelian Walls and just inside the line of the Anio Vetus. Once part of the Horti Liciniani on the Esquiline Hill, it now faces the modern Via Giolitti. It was once thought to be the temple to Minerva Medica ("Minerva the Doctor") mentioned by Cicero and other sources.

The decagonal structure in opus latericium is relatively well preserved, though the full dome collapsed in 1828. It is surrounded on three sides with other chambers which were added at a later date. There is no mention of it in ancient literature or inscriptions.

The structure represents a transition in Roman secular architecture between the octagonal dining room of the Domus Aurea and the dome of the Pantheon, and the architecture of nearby Byzantine churches. The diameter of the hall was approximately 24 meters, and the height was 33 meters. Inside the nymphaeum, there are nine niches beside the entrance, and above these niches are ten corresponding round-arched windows. Both the interior and exterior walls were once covered with marble.

In Flavio Biondo's 15th-century Roma Instaurata, these ruins are called Le Galluzze, a name of uncertain meaning that had been applied earlier to some ruins near the basilica of Santa Croce in Gerusalemme. Its incorrect identification as the Republican-era temple dates to the 17th century, based on the incorrect impression that the Athena Giustiniani had been found there. A similar building was built about 50 years later in Cologne, the central part of today's St Gereon's Basilica.

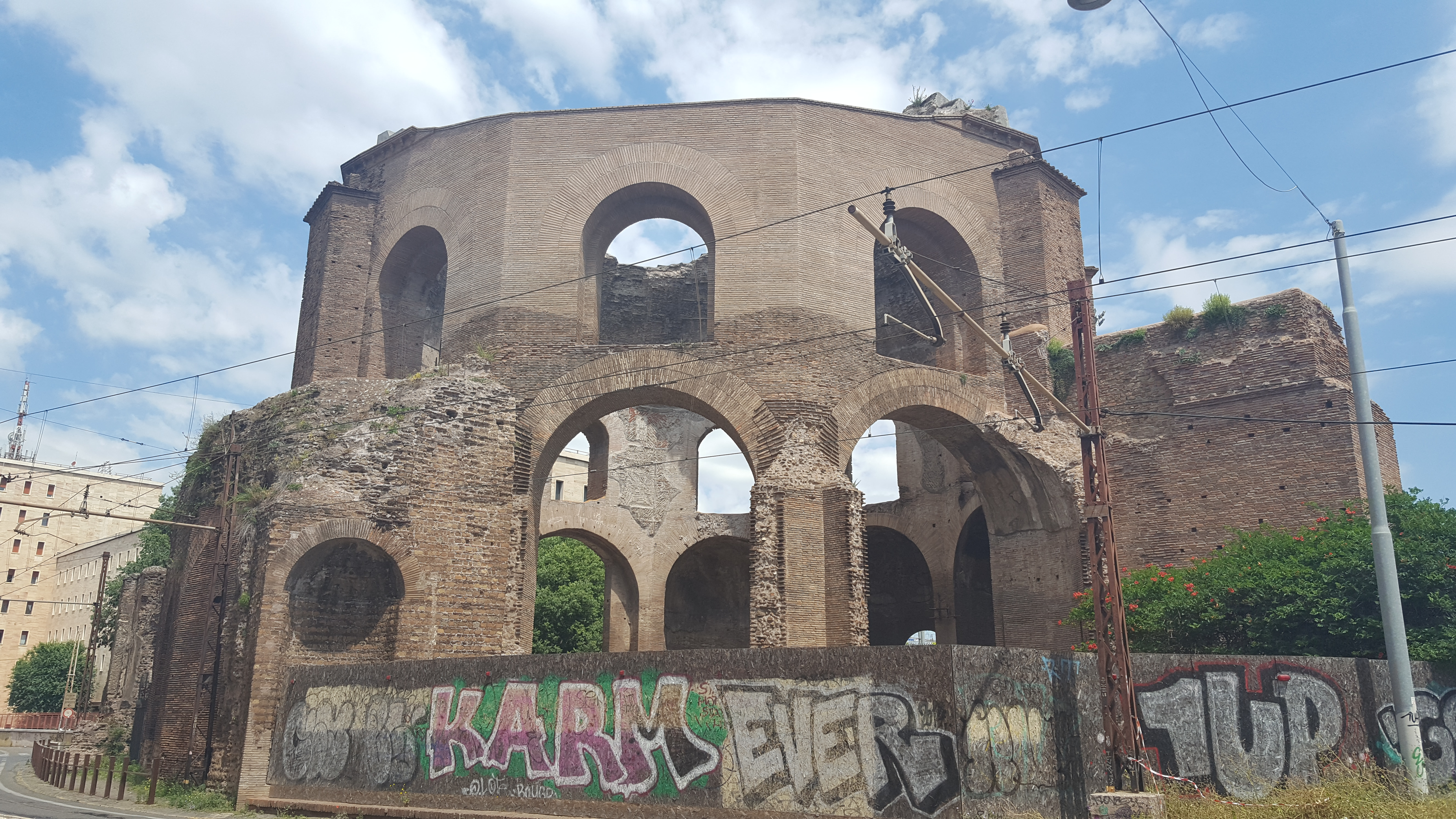

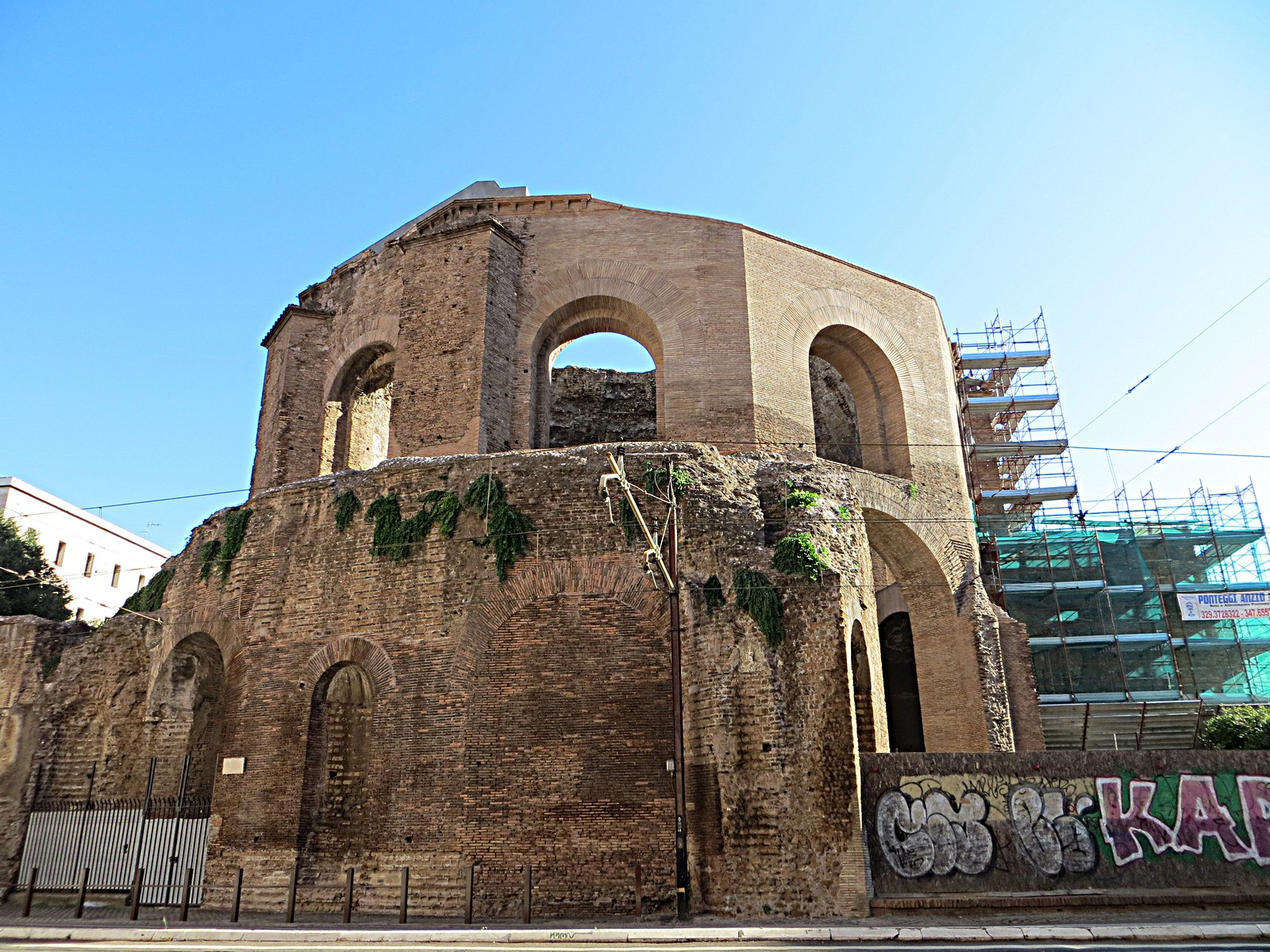

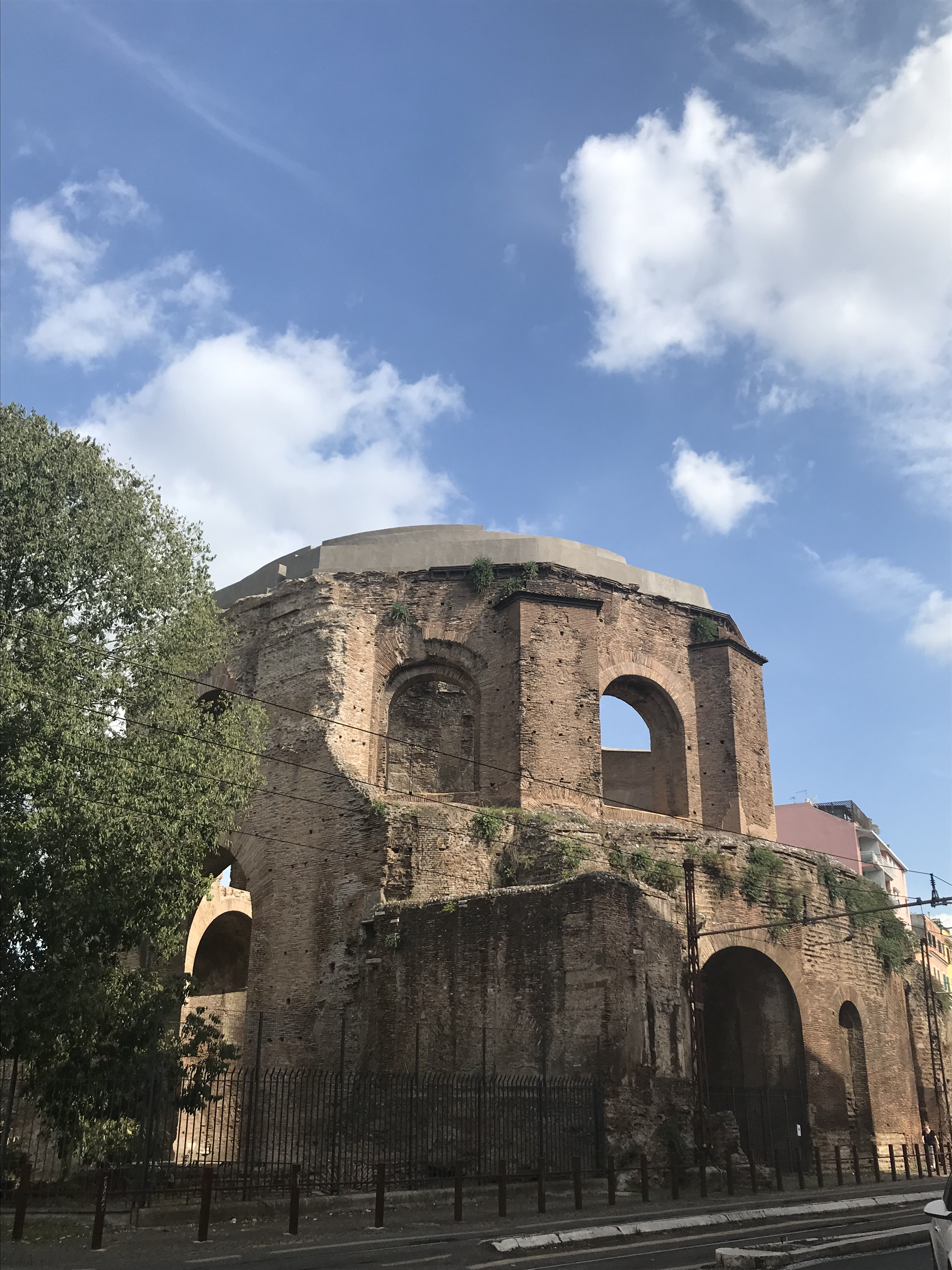

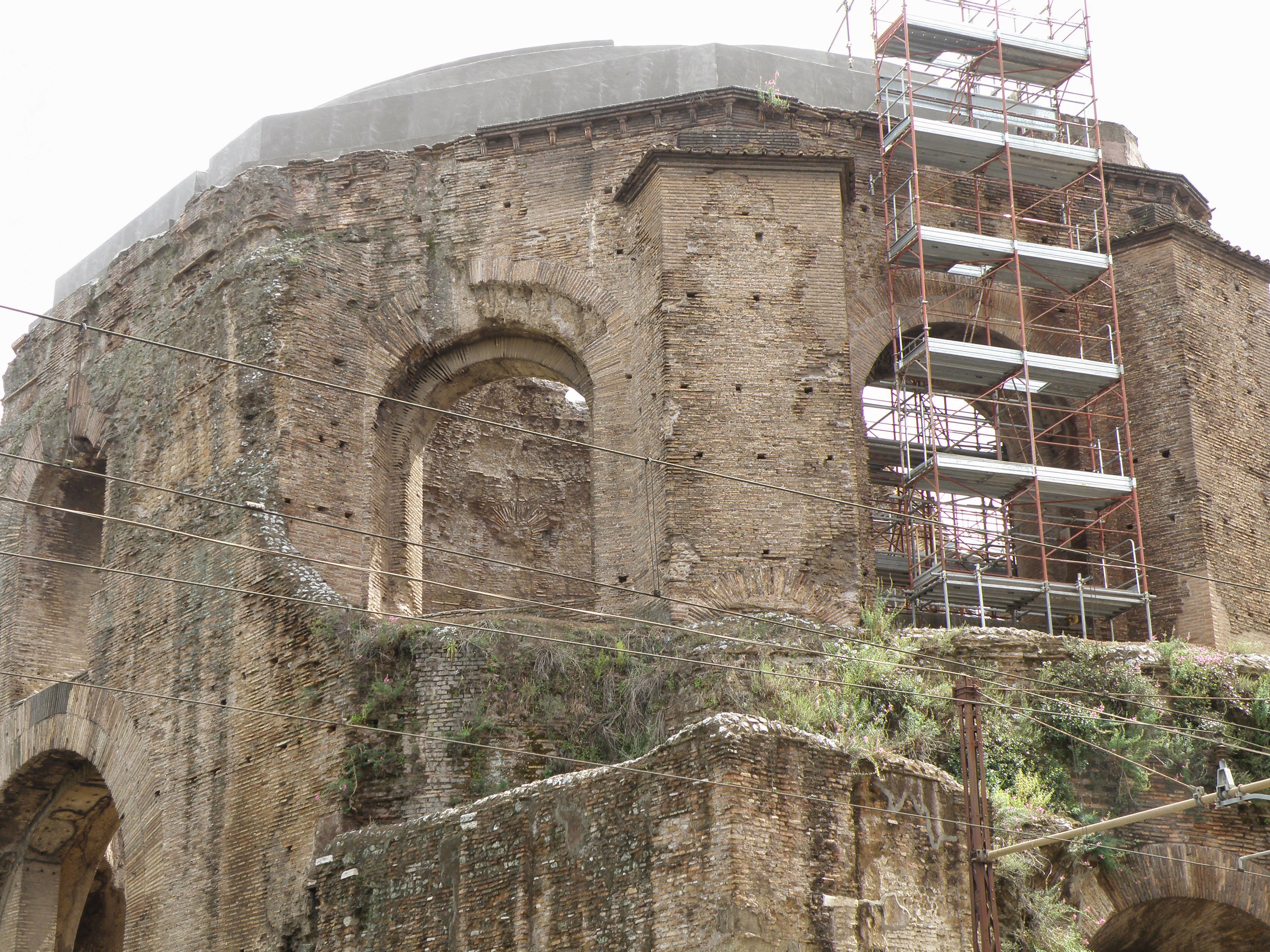

== See also ==
- List of Roman domes
- Ancient Roman and Byzantine domes
