= Athena Giustiniani =

Statue of goddess Minerva or Athena

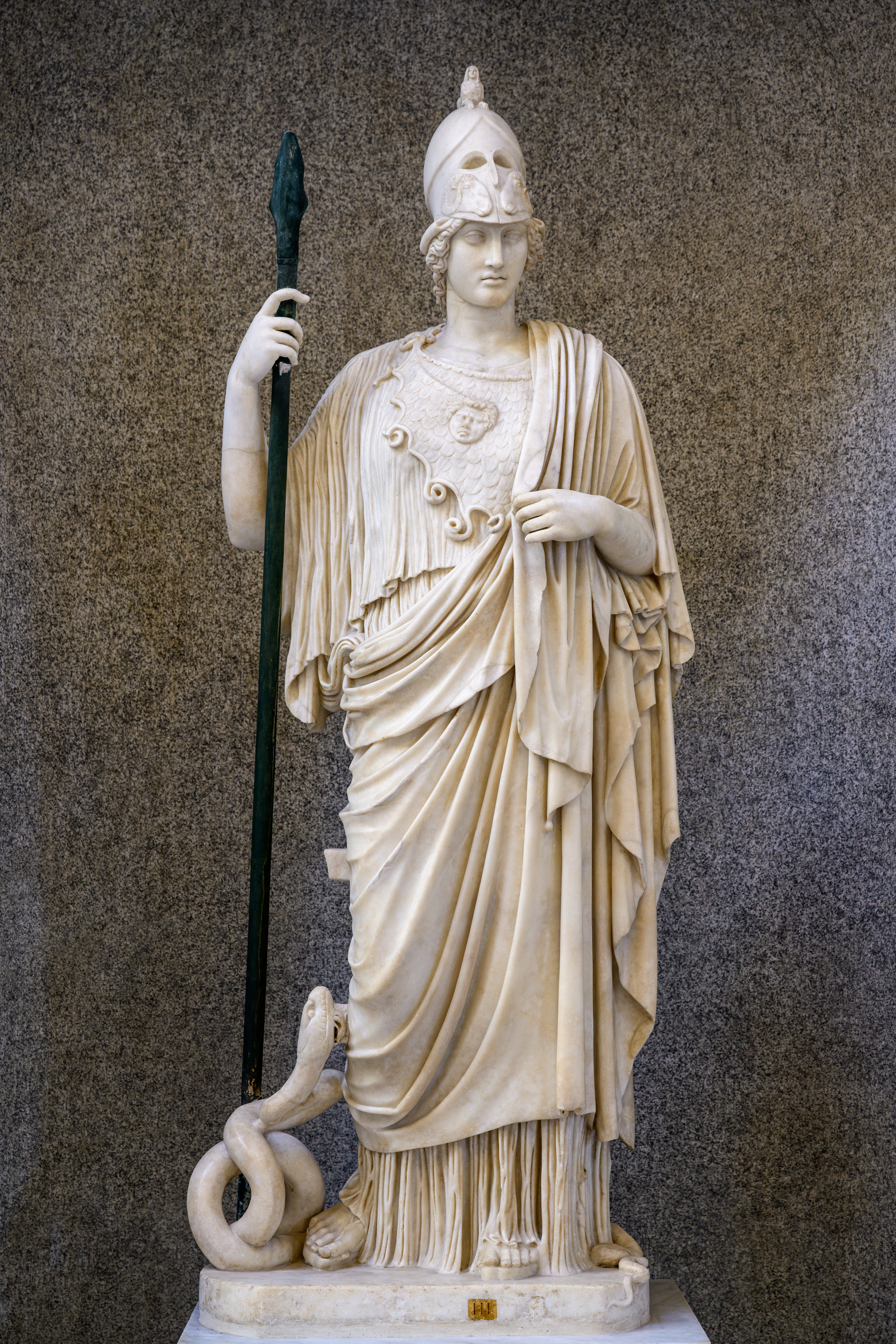
The Athena Giustiniani, a Roman copy of a Greek statue of Pallas Athena (Vatican Museums)

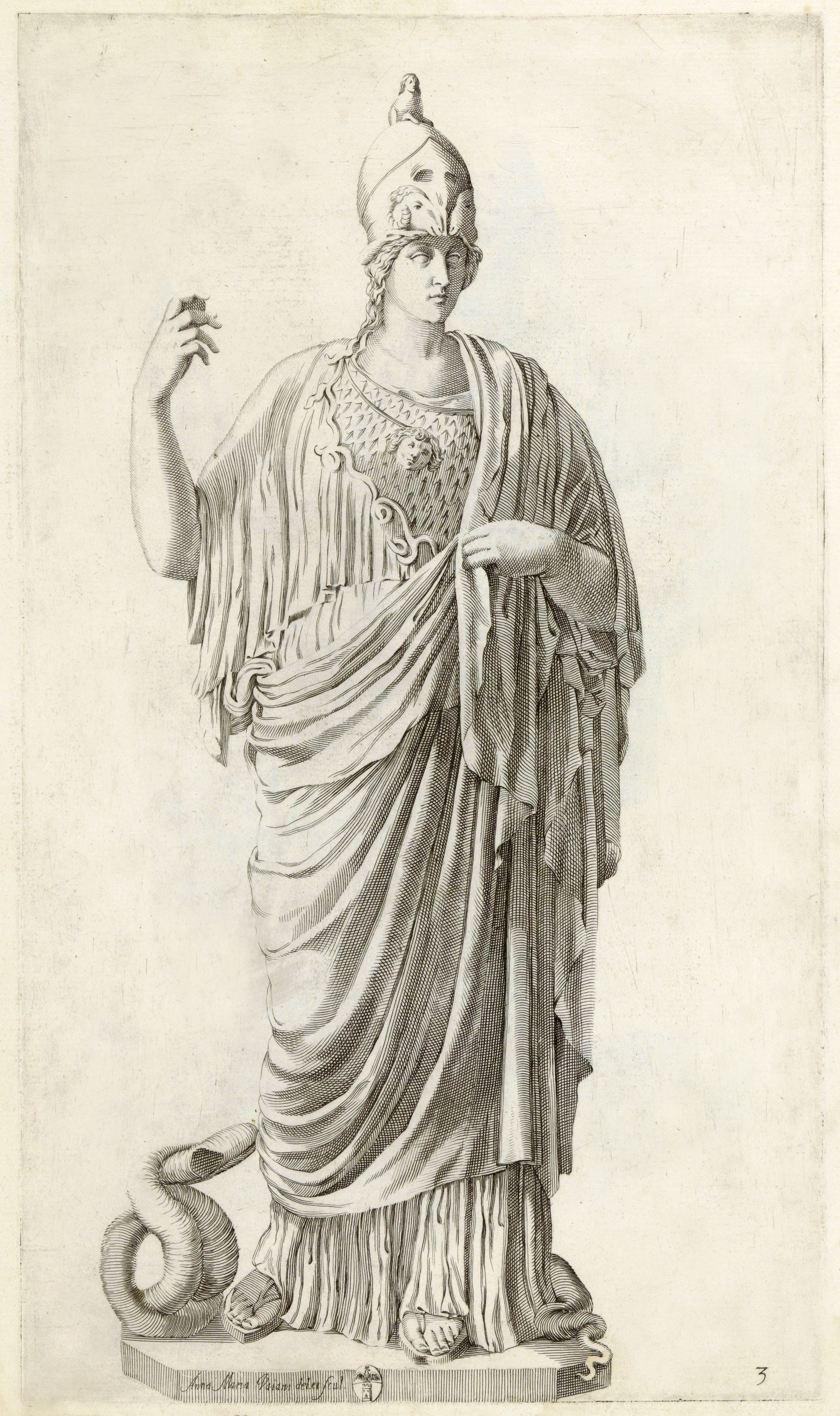
Engraving from the Galleria Giustiniana, c. 1630–1640 (the first publication of the statue)

The Athena Giustiniani or Minerva Giustiniani is a Roman marble statue of Pallas Athena, based on a Greek bronze sculpture of the late 5th–early 4th century BCE. Formerly in the collection of Vincenzo Giustiniani, it is now in the Vatican Museums (inv. 2223).

== Description and date ==
The statue, of Parian marble, is 2.25 m high. It depicts Athena standing, wearing a thin chiton covered by a heavier himation draped over her left shoulder. On her breast is an aegis with a gorgoneion. Her left arm reaches across the front of her body to hold the edge of the himation; the right arm is bent upward at the elbow to clasp a spear. On her head is a Corinthian helmet, and on the ground to her right is a coiled serpent, which may allude to the story of Erichthonios, the authochthonous king of Athens. The forearms and parts of the fingers are modern restorations, as are the spear, the sphinx on the helmet, and the head and part of the coils of the serpent.

There is general agreement that the statue is a Roman work that looks back to Classical Greek models of the second half of the 5th and the first half of the 4th century BCE, but beyond this there is no consensus about the precise date or authorship of the Greek sculpture(s) that inspired it.

== Discovery and history of ownership ==
The statue is first attested in the 17th century in the collection of the Italian banker and art collector Vincenzo Giustiniani, from whom it received its modern nickname. It is the first statue illustrated in the Galleria Giustiniana, a luxuriously produced series of engravings of works in the Giustiniani collection, which was published in the 1630s or 1640s. The statue was discovered in Rome, but early sources offer two different opinions about its find spot. According to one tradition, first recorded in the 18th century, it was recovered from the ruins of the nymphaeum on the Esquiline Hill mistakenly identified as a "Temple of Minerva Medica"; according to the other, recorded in the 17th century by Pietro Santi Bartoli and more widely accepted by modern scholars, it was found in the Orto di Minerva, adjacent to the church of Santa Maria sopra Minerva, which was thought to have been built over a temple of Minerva. A later family tradition among the Giustiniani held that the statue's head had been found separately during the construction of the Collegio Romano and sold to them by the Jesuits at an exorbitant price.

The statue was bought by Lucien Bonaparte in 1805 and placed in the grand hall of his Roman residence, the Palazzo Nunez. In 1817 he sold it to Pope Pius VII, who in 1822 installed it in the newly constructed Braccio Nuovo of the Vatican Museums, where it remains today.

== Reputation and influence ==
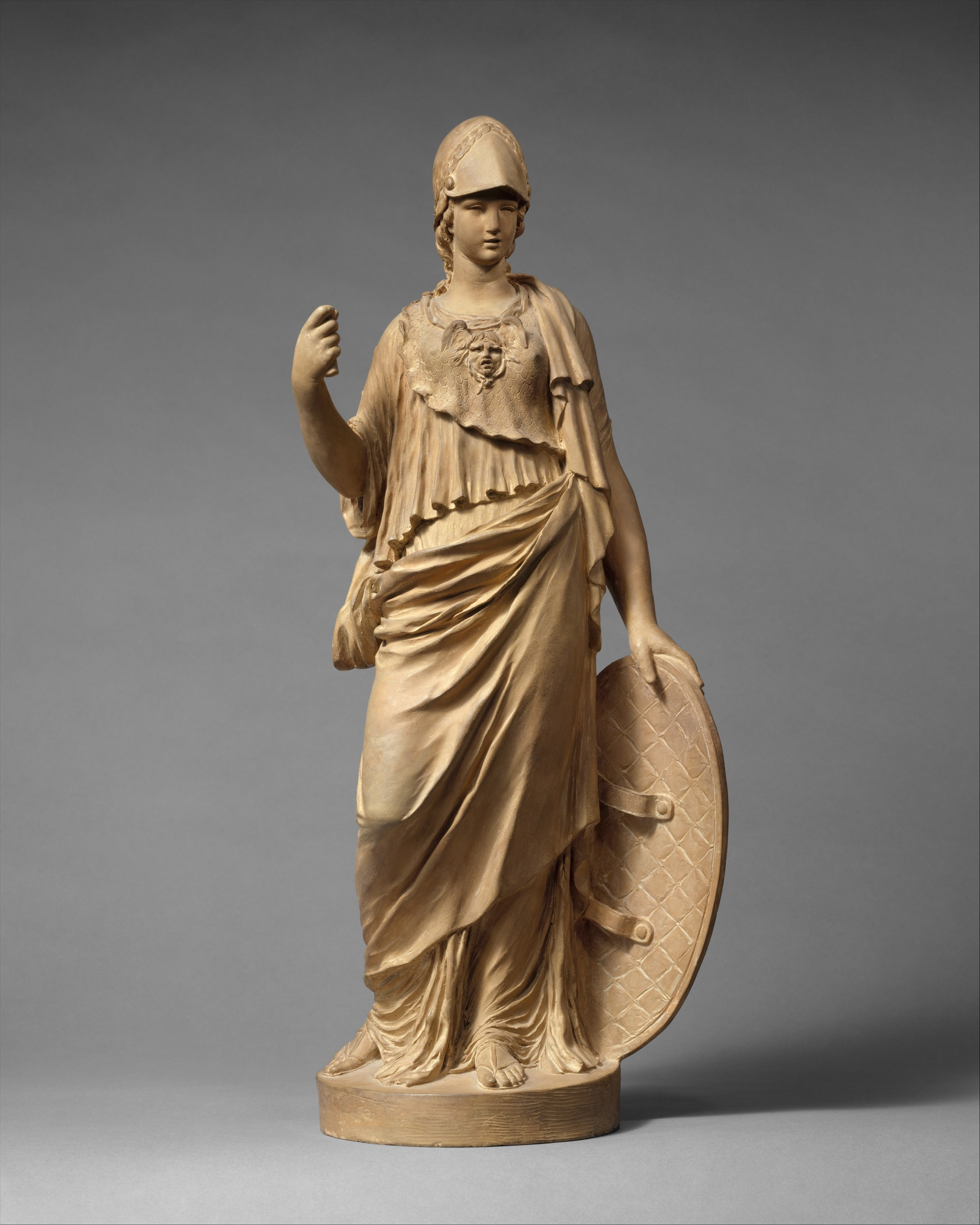
Terracotta statuette of Minerva by Clodion (Claude Michel) (Metropolitan Museum of Art, New York)

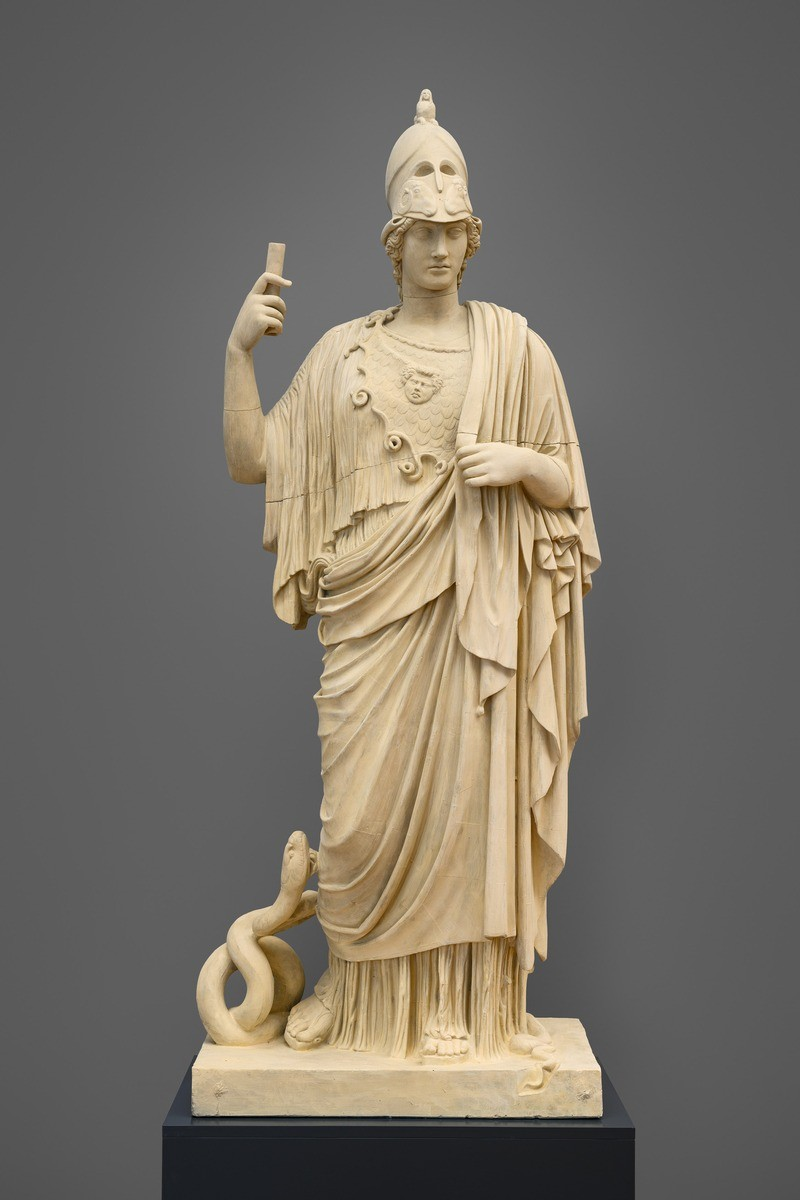
Plaster cast of Athena Giustiniani (1864), Glyptothek of the Academy of Fine Arts Vienna

From the time of its discovery the Athena Giustiniani has been widely admired. It was highly regarded by Goethe, who saw it in the Palazzo Giustiniani in January of 1787, and who records a story told to him by the wife of the custodian that illustrates its high reputation, especially among British visitors: she said that the English used to venerate the figure by kissing its hand, which as a result was whiter than the rest of the statue. Its popularity and influence in the 18th century can be traced through a variety of small-scale copies and allusions in other arts:

- A bust adapted from the statue appears as a tabletop decoration in more than a dozen of Pompeo Batoni's portraits of English visitors to Rome from the 1730s to the 1760s.
- A terracotta statuette created in 1766 by the French sculptor Claude Michel, who adopted the Greek name "Clodion", is a pastiche of several ancient statues of Athena, most notably the Athena Giustiniani.
- On a jasper ware vase designed by John Flaxman and produced by the Wedgwood company in the 1780s, known as the "Apotheosis of Homer vase" or the "Pegasus vase", a miniature copy of the Athena Giustiniani stands within an Ionic aedicula.

In the 19th and early 20th centuries, when plaster casts of classical sculpture were produced in large quantities for museums, schools, and private collections in the United States, copies of the "Minerva Giustiniani" appear regularly in the catalogues of several commercial cast manufacturers. Such casts representing Europe's great sculpture were exhibited regularly at American world's fairs and other expositions, such as the Pan-American Exposition in Buffalo in 1901 and the Louisiana Purchase Exposition in St. Louis in 1904.

== See also ==
- Athena of Velletri, a closely similar type.
