= Fort Louvois =

Fort on a tidal island in France

- 400 meters off shore in the town of Bourcefranc-le-Chapus in the department of Charente-Maritime
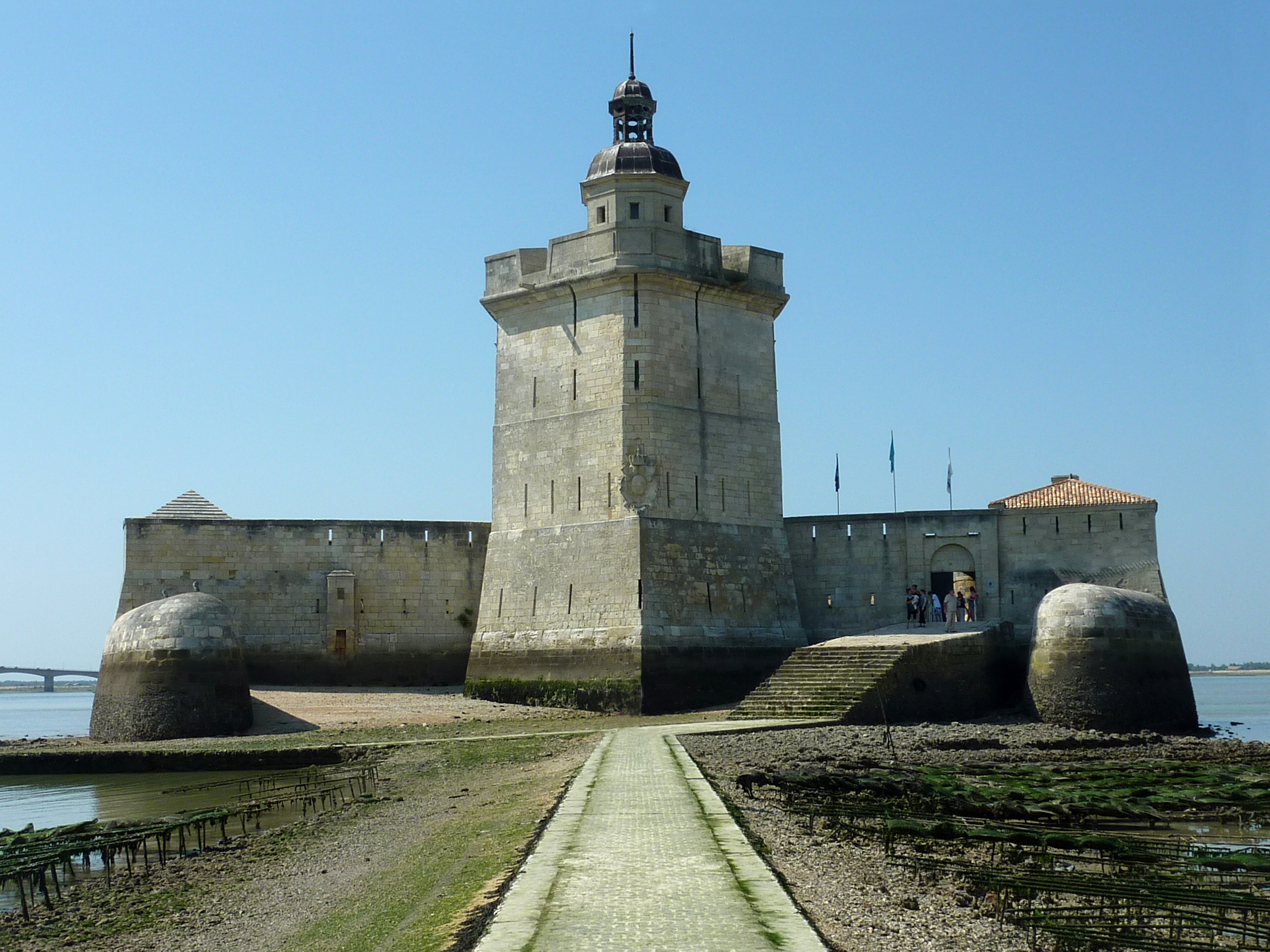
- View of Fort Louvois from the landward side

Site information
- Type: Fortress
- Controlled by: France

Location
- Coordinates: 45°51′26″N 1°10′27″W

Site history
- Architect: François Ferry; Vauban

Fort Louvois, which is known locally as Fort Chapus or Fort du Chapus, is a fortification built between 1691 and 1694, during the reign of Louis XIV, on the Chapus islet, and is about 400 metres (1,300 ft) offshore in the town of Bourcefranc-le-Chapus in the department of Charente-Maritime, France. The fort sits opposite the citadel of Château d'Oléron on the island of Oléron. The fort was positioned so that a crossfire from the château and the fort would control the Pertuis de Maumusson (Passage of Maumusson) and impede access to the Rochefort roads from the south. Fort Louvois only saw action towards the end of World War II when bombardment greatly damaged the fort, necessitating later restoration.

Since 1972 the fort has been the site of a museum of oyster farming, and there are oyster beds next to the causeway that joins the fort to the shore. The fort also houses a permanent exhibition that describes the history of the fort and that contains models of fortifications on the Charente coast. During the summer a shuttle boat that operates during high tide takes visitors to the fort; at low tide the fort is accessible via a causeway.

== Design ==
Fort Louvois consists of a horseshoe-shaped battery, with a tower redoubt or keep in the gorge or opening of the horseshoe. The tower is semi-circular on the seaward side, i.e., on the side within the horseshoe; the landward side is beak-shaped. A moat, which fills at high tide, separates the tower from the rest of the fort, with one drawbridge providing access to the fort, and a second to the tower.

The area that the battery occupies is about 52 and 55 metres (171 and 180 ft). The firing platform is 12 metres (39 ft) above the surface of the water, and the battery's lateral coverage is 180 degrees. The keep has five levels and is 24 metres (79 ft) high. The tower had the powder magazine on the ground floor, and quarters for the commander and the other officers on the other floors. Today, there is a lighthouse on the tower. A barracks building on the fort's terre plein contained the arms room, food stores, and a water tank. A causeway that is underwater at high-tide joins the fort to the shore.

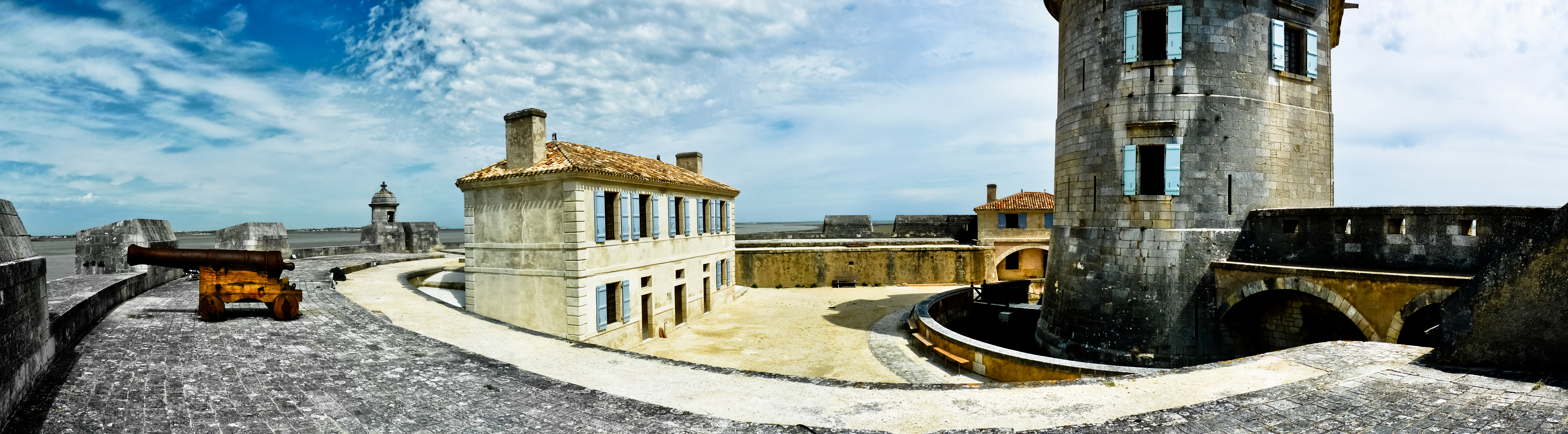
View of the interior of the fort, with the keep on the right.

== History ==
After the completion of the arsenal at Rochefort in 1666, Louis XIV wanted to create a chain of fortifications on the coast of Aunis and Saintonge. A number of fortifications were built to defend the Rochefort, with Fort Louvois being the last commissioned under Louis XIV. (The first half of the 19th Century saw the addition of Fort Boyard.)

On 16 December 1690, the Marquis of Louvois, the Minister of War, initiated the project. He wrote to Michel Bégon, the Naval Intendant at Rochefort, informing him that the king wished that a fort be erected on Chapus. François Ferry, an engineer, took charge of the process, designing an oval fort measuring 52 metres (171 ft) by 78 metres (256 ft) and consisting of two levels, with embrasures on both levels. The design was analogous to that of Fort Risban at Calais, or Grand Risban at Dunkirk.

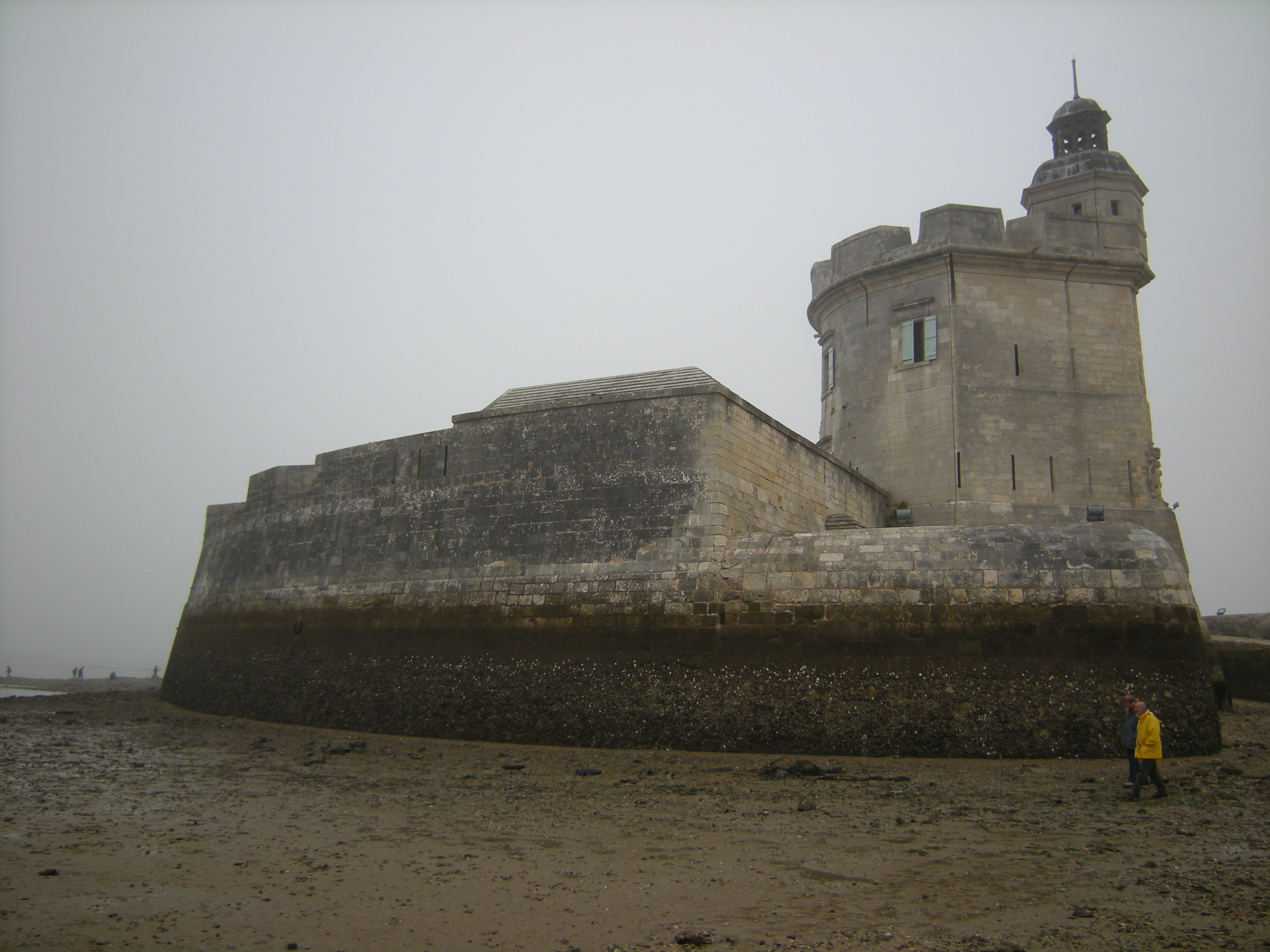
Fort Louvois at low-tide.

Work on building the fort's foundations began on 19 June 1691. Because the islet was made up of shellfish and mud, the work was extremely difficult with the result that by 20 October only the stone foundations were in place despite the fact that the project had already expended more than half the funds budgeted for construction.

After Louvois's death on 16 July 1691, the military architect Vauban took over the project. He modified the original design to create a simpler and cheaper fort. He gave what would become Fort Louvois its present-day horseshoe shape with two pier heads and one tower, and reduced the two levels of batteries to one level. The new design resembled that of two other forts that Vauban had constructed, Fort Lupin, which he had constructed between 1683 and 1686 on the southern bank of the Charente river, and the Tour Vauban and battery, which he had constructed on the Sillon at Camaret-sur-Mer, as part of the fortifications of the Goulet de Brest. Construction of Fort Louvois took three years and was completed under the engineer Henri-Albert Bouillet.

In 1755 Fort Louvois saw modifications that were intended to keep pace with advances in weaponry. One result was the reduction in the number of embrasures for artillery to ten from the original 16. The battery lost its roof, and the fort also received latrines on the walls. These were the last modifications to the fort.

In 1824 the fort was armed with four 24-pounder guns and three 32-pounder mortars. Then in 1870 it received six 22-pounder howitzers. The fort was repaired in 1875 to undo damage from the action of the sea. At that time it received a telegraph station and six 16-pounder guns.

After the First World War, the French military abandoned the fort. On 14 June 1929 it was declared a historical monument.

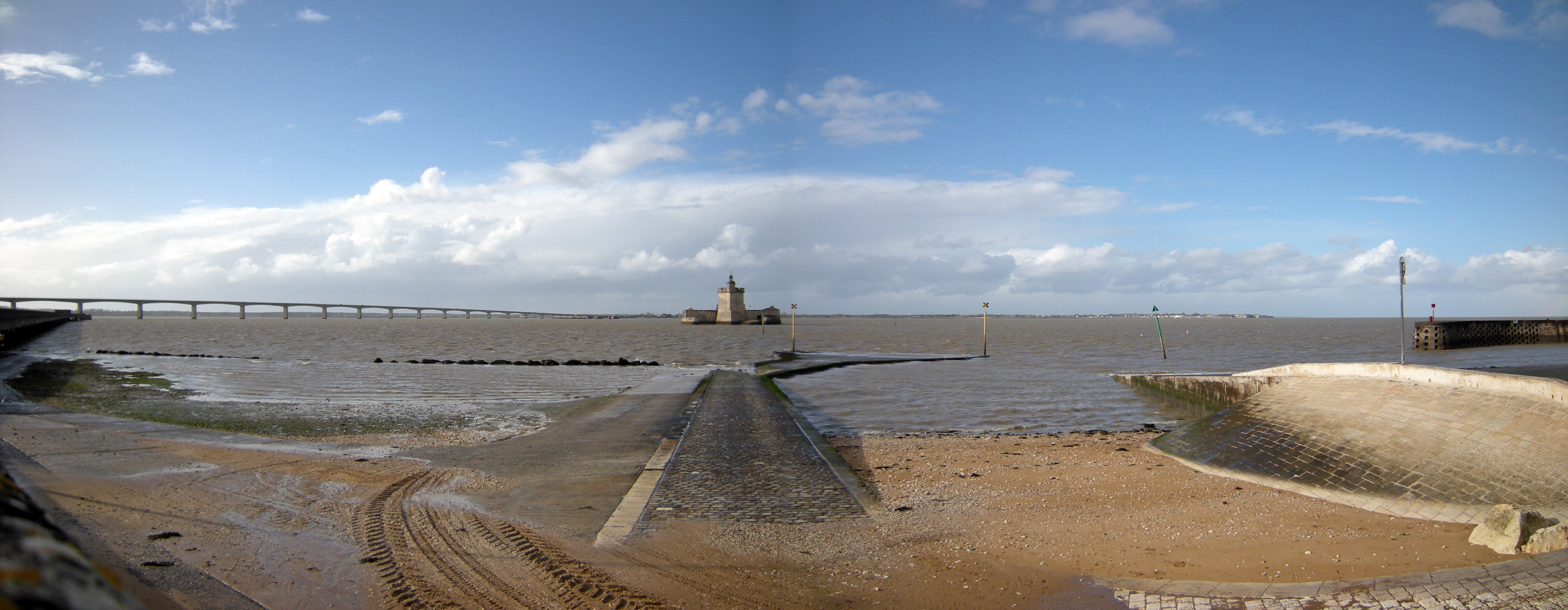
Fort Louvois in the Pertuis de Maumusson.

Nevertheless, on 10 September 1944 it underwent shelling during the liberation of Marennes. The German army took possession of the fort but withdrew within a day due to the Allied advance. Free French forces then occupied the fort, only to come under fire from the Château d'Oléron, which was still in the hands of the German Army. The bombardment destroyed the guardhouse, the barracks, and much of the keep. After the liberation of France, scaffolding had to be erected on the tower's north-west face to prevent the tower's collapse.

Bourcefranc-le-Chapus purchased the fort from the French government in 1960. In the 1960s it was completely restored under the direction of the Regional Administration for Cultural Affairs. Fort Louvois was opened to the public in 1972.

In 2010, the storm Xynthia damaged Fort Louvois. The storm flooded the fort and swept away the drawbridge. Still, the fort received 26,000 visitors in 2010.

== Citations and references ==
Citations

References

- Faucherre, N., P. Prost, A. Chazette, & F. Le Blanc (2000) Les fortifications du littoral - La Charente Maritime. (Éditions patrimoines et médias). ISBN 2-910137-17-1
- Lepage, Jean-Denis G.G. (2010) Vauban and the French Military Under Louis XIV: An Illustrated History of Fortifications and Strategies. (McFarland & Co.) ISBN 978-0-7864-4401-4
