= Arsène Lupin (disambiguation) =

Arsène Lupin is a fictional character who appears in a series of novels written by French writer Maurice Leblanc, as well as a number of non-canonical sequels and numerous film, television, stage play and comic book adaptations.

Arsène Lupin may also refer to:

- Arsène Lupin (1909 film), a short film with Georges Tréville as Lupin
- Arsène Lupin (1914 film), with Georges Tréville as Lupin
- Arsène Lupin (1916 film), with Gerald Ames as Lupin (UK)
- Arsene Lupin (1917 film), with Earle Williams as Lupin (US)
- Arsène Lupin (1932 film), with John Barrymore as Lupin (US)
- Arsène Lupin (2004 film), with Romain Duris as Lupin
- Arsène Lupin (TV series) (1971–1974), a French TV show

== See also ==
- Lupin (disambiguation)
- Lupin the Third (disambiguation)
