= Bourcefranc-le-Chapus =

- Commune
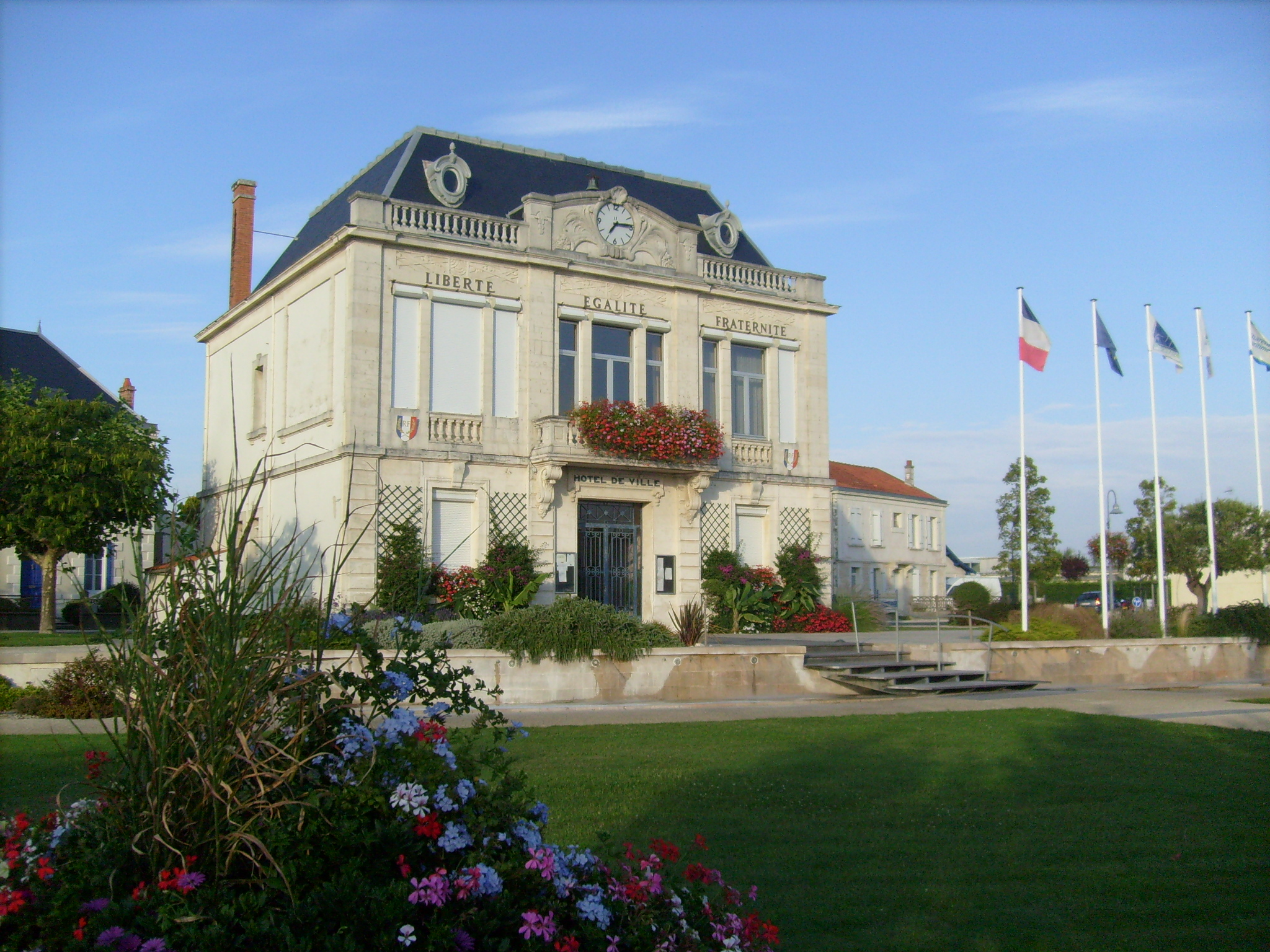
- The town hall

- Coat of arms
- Location of Bourcefranc-le-Chapus
- Location within France Location within Nouvelle-Aquitaine
- Coordinates: 45°50′50″N 1°08′51″W
- Country: France
- Region: Nouvelle-Aquitaine
- Department: Charente-Maritime
- Arrondissement: Rochefort
- Canton: Marennes
- Intercommunality: Bassin de Marennes

Government
  - Mayor (2020–2026): Guy Proteau
- Area^{1}: 12.40 km^{2} (4.79 sq mi)
- Highest elevation: 18 m (59 ft)
- Lowest elevation: 0 m (0 ft)
- Population (2023): 3,486
  - Density: 281.1/km^{2} (728.1/sq mi)
- Time zone: UTC+01:00 (CET)
  - Summer (DST): UTC+02:00 (CEST)
- INSEE/Postal code: 17058 /17560
- ^{1} French Land Register data, which excludes lakes, ponds, glaciers > 1 km^{2} (0.386 sq mi or 247 acres) and river estuaries.

Bourcefranc-le-Chapus (French pronunciation: [buʁsəfʁɑ̃ lə ʃapy]) is a commune in the Charente-Maritime department in the Nouvelle-Aquitaine region in southwestern France. The commune was created in 1908 from part of Marennes. Bourcefranc-le-Chapus is a major oyster farming port. Fort Louvois is a fortification built by Vauban on the Chapus islet in front of the town.

== Geography ==
When looking at the entire French Atlantic coast, Bourcefranc-le-Chapus is in the middle section. Above all, the place has a direct connection to the Atlantic Ocean due to its location at the end of a small peninsula protruding into the Pertuis-Charentais sea area. The altitude of the place is between 0 and 18 m above sea level.

Bourcefranc-le-Chapus is located at the mouth of the Seudre River and at the Viaduc d'Oléron bridge to the island of Île d'Oléron. The neighboring communities are: Marennes-Hiers-Brouage to the east, south and southeast, as well as on the opposite side of the Strait of Oléron, Château-d'Oléron and Saint-Trojan-les-Bains on the Île d'Oléron.

== History ==
In the 15th century there were 2 small villages: Bourcefranc and Le Chapus as a fishing village on the tip of the peninsula reaching into the sea.

The name Bourcefranc is traced back to the medieval name Bourg-franc (free settlement); while the name Chapus is said to be derived from the Latin Caput, which here probably refers to the head end of the peninsula.

Bourcefranc was undoubtedly founded in the Middle Ages by the Marennes monastery, which was subordinate to the ladies' abbey Abbaye aux Dames Saintes. The history of the place was long linked to the larger neighboring community of Marennes, to which the current municipal area belonged until the beginning of the 20th century. The separation from Marennes led to the founding of the current municipality in 1908 from the two villages of Bourcefranc and Le Chapus. The municipal name Bourcefranc-le-Chapus has been officially used since 1970.

== Economic activities ==
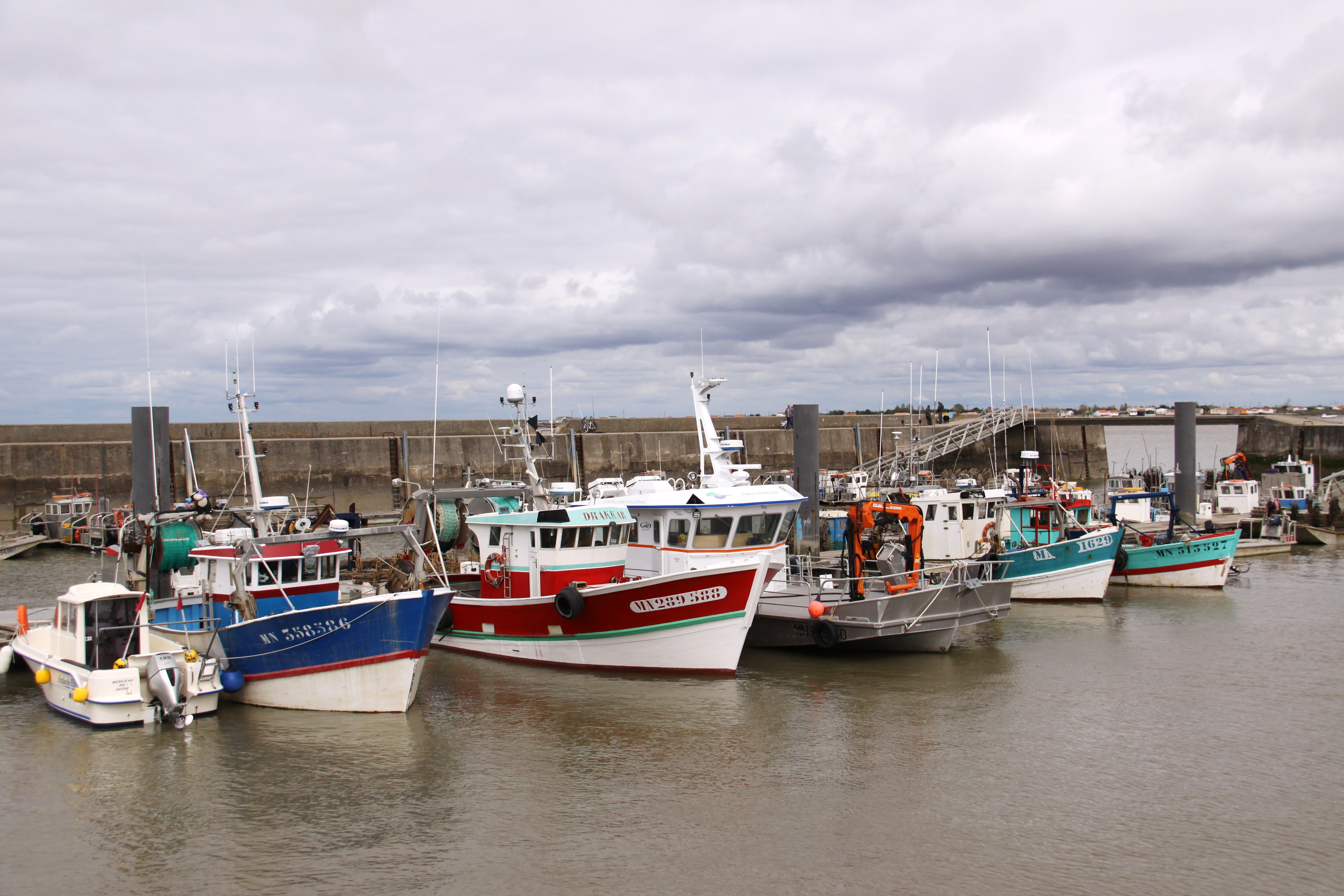
Harbor of Port du Chapus

Due to its location between the neighboring oyster town of Marennes, and the sea, Bourcefranc-le-Chapus belongs to the Marennes-Oléron sub-region, which is home to the most important oyster farms in France. Many former saltworks in the municipality are now oyster parks. Well-known oyster farmers who, among other things, breed quality oysters named Fines de claires vertes with the Label Rouge seal are based in Bourcefranc-le-Chapus.

The coastal community is now also characterized by some tourism. The small harbor of Port du Chapus, which is mainly and traditionally used by oyster fishermen's boats, has also been prepared to accommodate pleasure craft.

== Places to see ==
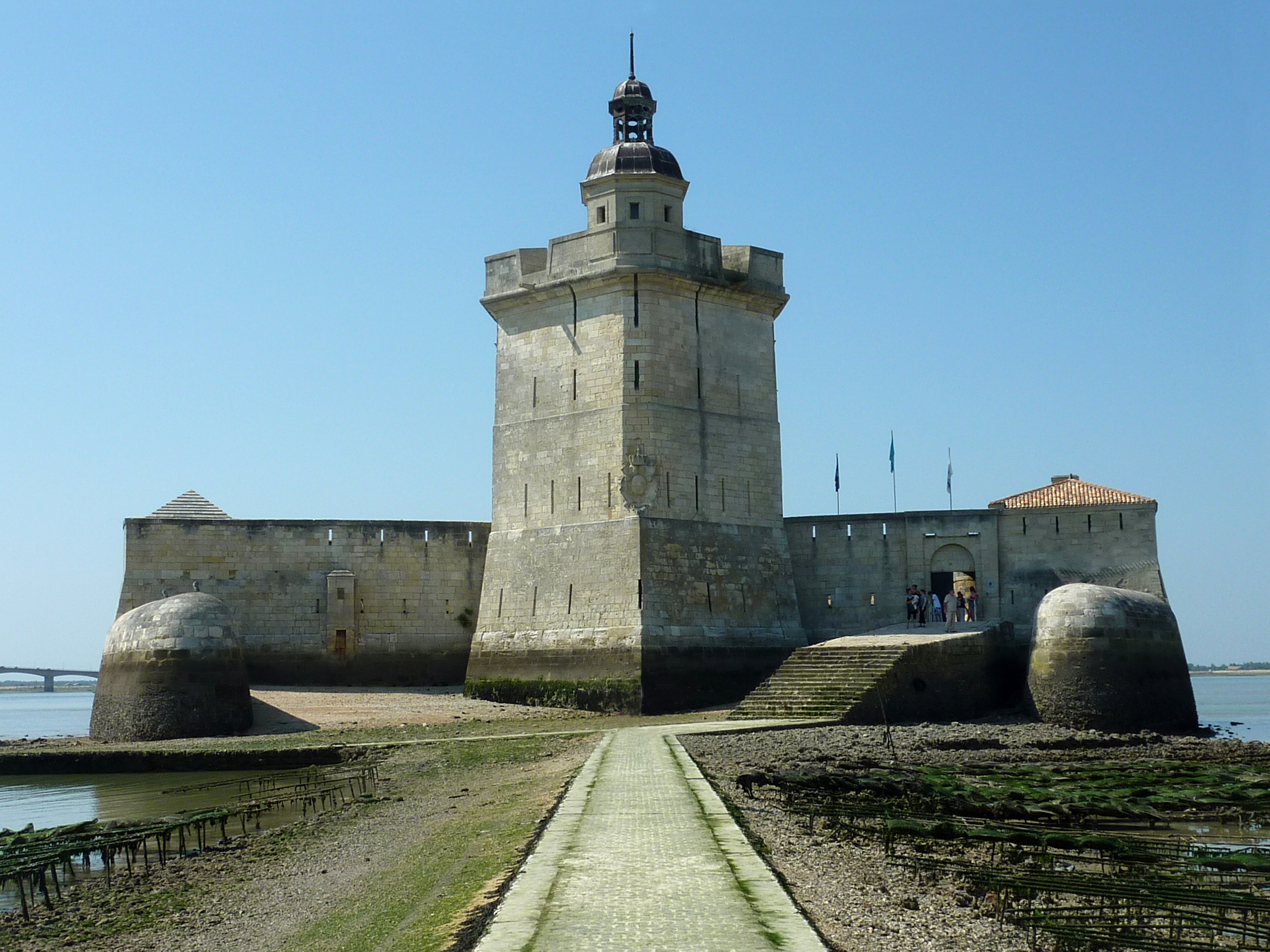
Fort Louvois.

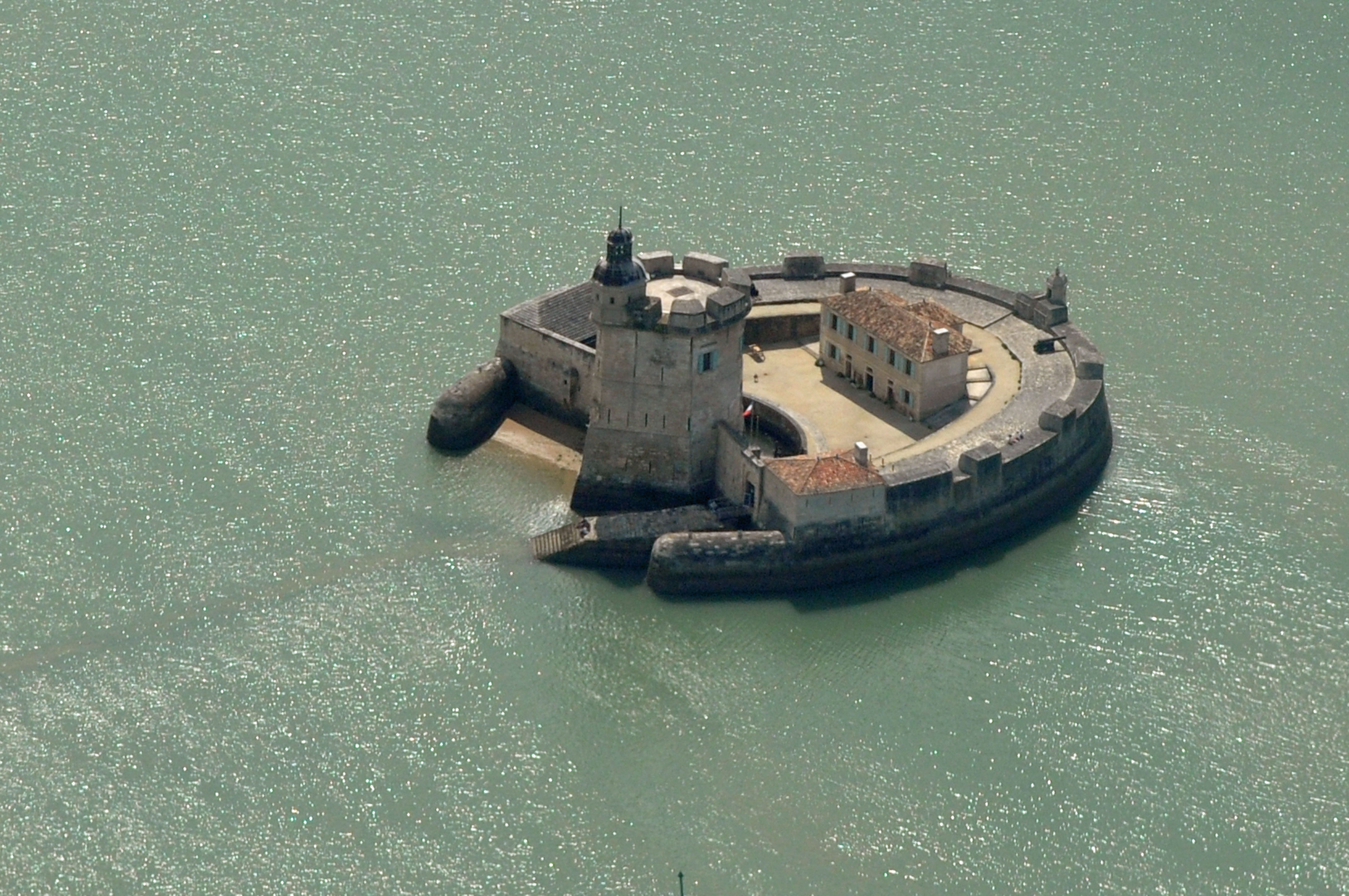
Fort Louvois at high tide

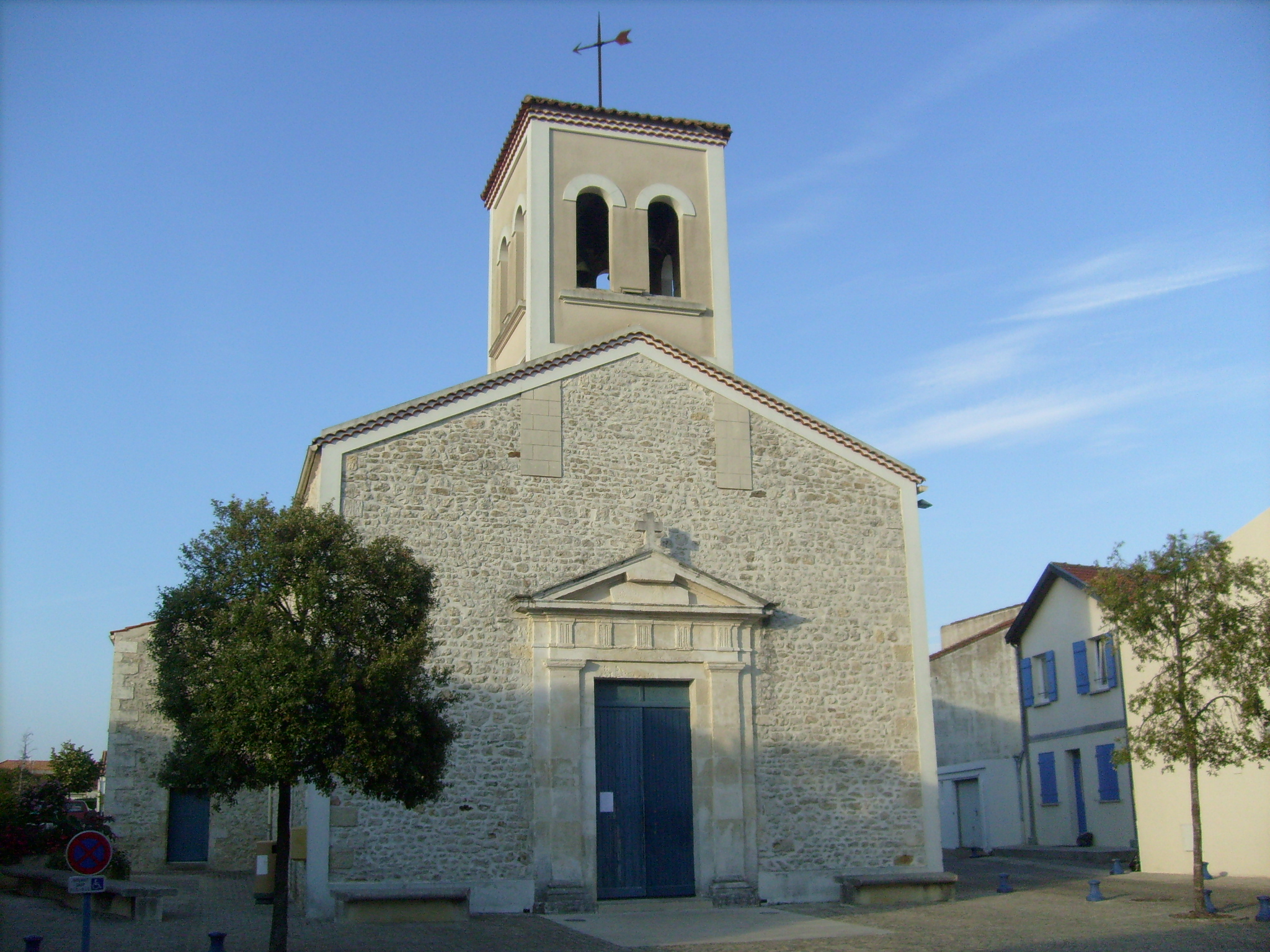
Saint-Louis church of Bourcefranc

- Fort Louvois (also: Fort Le Chapus) is a fortress built on a rock in the sea between 1691 and 1694 under the reign of King Louis XIV according to the plans of Vauban. It is 400 m from the mainland point Pointe du Chapus and is accessible via a paved path at low tide (flooding at high tide). Fort Louvois (like Fort Boyard further north) was intended to protect the country from attacks from the sea. It has been listed as a Monument historique since 1929.
- Saint-Louis church from the 17th century. It is said that the church was built around 1687 at the request of Madame de Maintenon, the second wife of King Louis XIV. She wanted to cross to the island of Île d'Oléron in Le Chapus and beforehand say a prayer and asked to visit a church. Since there was none, she brought about a royal decision to build a chapel and sent the necessary sum. The church was built in the center of Bourcefranc and was consecrated as a parish church in 1694.
- La Plataine, 17th century windmill. It was restored by the previous owner and, together with the nearby mill house, was purchased by the municipality of Bourcefranc-le-Chapus in 2003. An association was founded to make the mill functional again and open it to visitors.
- Viaduc d’Oléron (Oléron Bridge). Connects the European continent from the municipality of Bourcefranc-Le-Chapus via the road number 26 (D26) to the island of Ile d'Oléron. When it was completed in 1966, it was the longest bridge in France and replaced existing ferry connections.

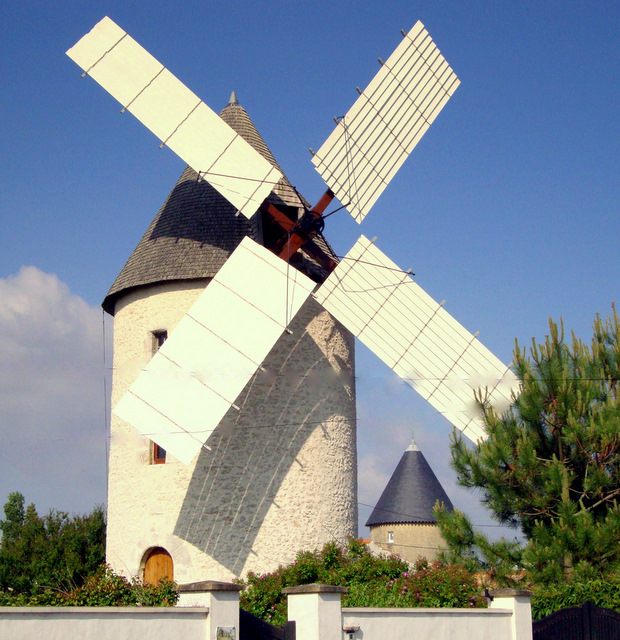
Windmill La Plataine of Bourcefranc

== Population ==
Historical population

Year	Pop.	±% p.a.
1911	2,152	—
1921	2,184	+0.15%
1926	2,401	+1.91%
1931	2,522	+0.99%
1936	2,763	+1.84%
1946	2,842	+0.28%
1954	2,878	+0.16%
1962	3,073	+0.82%
1968	3,095	+0.12%

Year	Pop.	±% p.a.
1975	2,984	−0.52%
1982	2,794	−0.94%
1990	2,851	+0.25%
1999	2,951	+0.38%
2007	3,311	+1.45%
2012	3,388	+0.46%
2017	3,454	+0.39%
2023	3,486	+0.15%

Source: EHESS and INSEE (1968-2023)

== Twin City ==
There has been a partnership with the German community of Rheinbrohl in Rhineland-Palatinate since 1965. Bourcefranc was the first municipality in the Poitou-Charentes region to enter into a municipal partnership, which lives on intensively to this day.

== See also ==
- Communes of the Charente-Maritime department
