= Lupine =

Lupine may be one of several things:

- Something that is like, or relating to, a wolf (Canis lupus).
- Lupinus, a genus of flowering plants
- Lu Pine Records, a record label in Detroit.

== See also ==
- Lupin (disambiguation)
