= Hiers-Brouage =

Commune in Charente-Maritime, France

- Part of Marennes-Hiers-Brouage
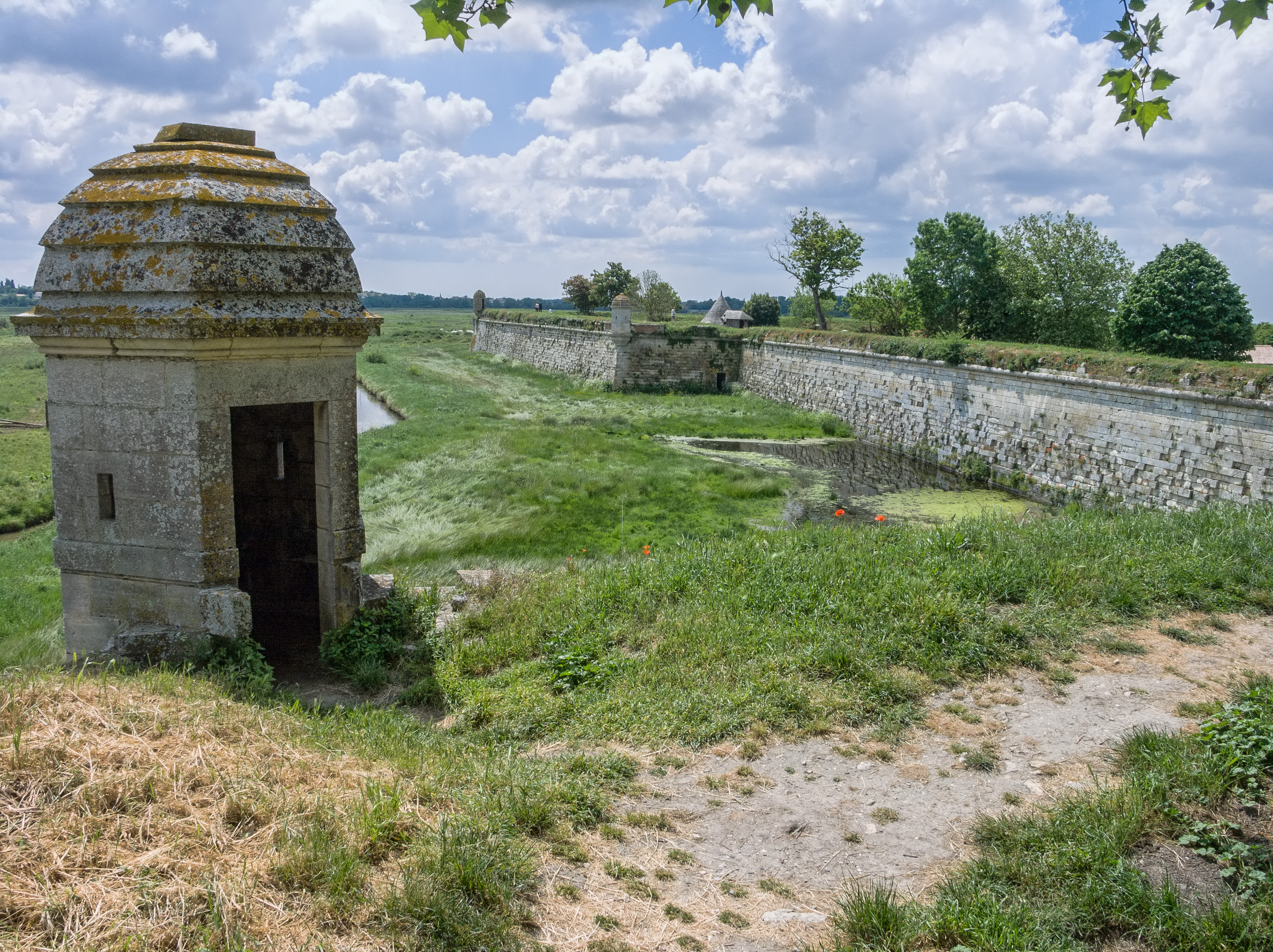
- Citadel

- Coat of arms
- Location of Hiers-Brouage
- Location within France Location within Nouvelle-Aquitaine
- Coordinates: 45°51′02″N 1°04′28″W
- Country: France
- Region: Nouvelle-Aquitaine
- Department: Charente-Maritime
- Arrondissement: Rochefort
- Canton: Marennes
- Commune: Marennes-Hiers-Brouage
- Area^{1}: 31.35 km^{2} (12.10 sq mi)
- Highest elevation: 26 m (85 ft)
- Lowest elevation: 0 m (0 ft)
- Population (2023): 632
  - Density: 20.2/km^{2} (52.2/sq mi)
- Time zone: UTC+01:00 (CET)
  - Summer (DST): UTC+02:00 (CEST)
- Postal code: 17320
- ^{1} French Land Register data, which excludes lakes, ponds, glaciers > 1 km^{2} (0.386 sq mi or 247 acres) and river estuaries.

Hiers-Brouage (French pronunciation: [jɛʁs bʁuaʒ]) is a former commune in the Charente-Maritime department, southwestern France. It is a member of Les Plus Beaux Villages de France (The Most Beautiful Villages of France) Association. On 1 January 2019, it was merged into the new commune Marennes-Hiers-Brouage.

== History ==
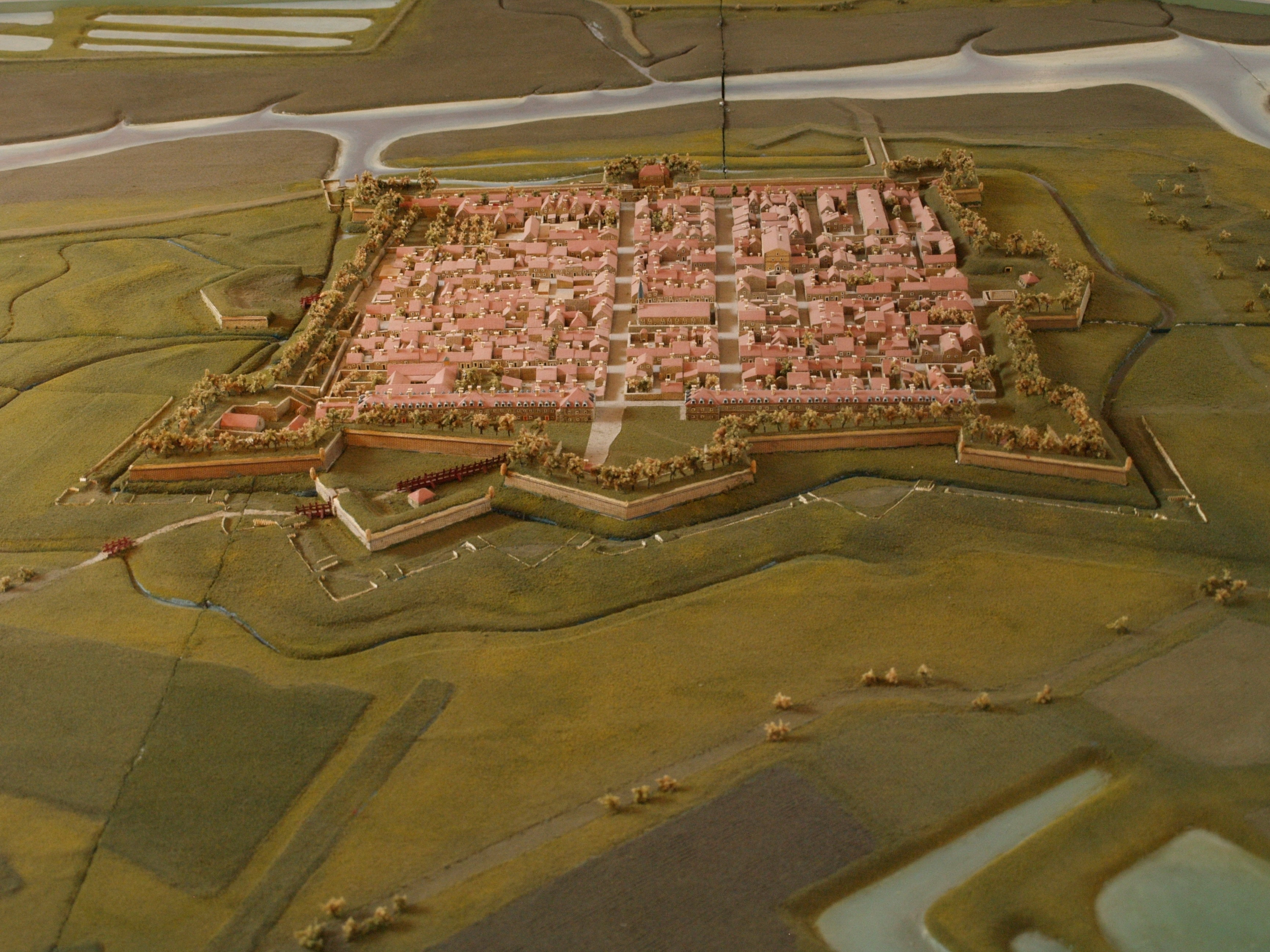
Citadel of Brouage - reproduction of a 17th-century scale model

Brouage was founded in 1555 by Jacques de Pons on the Bay of Biscay facing the Atlantic Ocean. The town was founded on swampy land which had previously been underwater. Its name, "Brouage," comes from the surrounding mixture of water and clay, which was called "broue".

Its economy was based on salt and access to the sea. Brouage was known for producing salt that was black in colour, which was often sold to the royal family. Brouage exported large quantities of salt by land and sea as early as the 15th century.

The town was fortified between 1630 and 1640 by Cardinal Richelieu as a Catholic bastion in order to fight against the neighbouring Protestant town of La Rochelle. Gradually the harbour silted up in the last part of the 17th century, leaving the town stranded and useless as a port. It fell into ruin.

The town's most celebrated person is the French navigator Samuel de Champlain, who lived here when young, before being the co-founder of the French settlement in Acadia (1604–1607) and Quebec (1608–1635). Cartographer Charles Leber du Carlo lived in Brouage at the same time and may not have taught the art of map-making to the young Champlain.

In 1825 Brouage was joined to the village of Hiers, 2.5 km (1.6 mi) away, forming the commune of Hiers-Brouage.

== Sights ==
- The village church dedicated to Saint Peter and Saint Paul built in 1608. Since 1982, several stained glass windows have been installed by Quebec and New Brunswick to commemorate historical figures of New France, including Samuel de Champlain who was living when young in the village.
- The Samuel de Champlain Museum.
- The walls of the ramparts of the citadel of Brouage.
- The Porte royale or King's gate which gave access to the quais.
- The Saint-Luc powderhouse (poudrière) with four flying-buttresses.
- The Halle aux vivres or Warehouse built to store goods and supplies for the citadel.

== See also ==
- Communes of the Charente-Maritime department
