= Lupin (disambiguation) =

Lupin most often refers to:

- Lupinus, a genus of plants in the legume family
- Lupin bean, used as food

Lupin may also refer to:

== People ==
- Auguste Lupin (1807–1895), a French racing personality and Thoroughbred racehorse owner

== Arts and entertainment ==
- Lúpin, a comic book from Argentina
- Lupin the Third, a Japanese manga series by Monkey Punch and the subsequent media franchise
- Lupin (Philippine TV series), a 2007 Philippine television drama action series
- Lupin (EP), a 2010 EP and title song by South Korean girl group Kara
- Lupin (French TV series), a 2021 Netflix television series starring Omar Sy

== Fictional characters ==
- Arsène Lupin, gentleman thief turned detective extraordinaire in novels by Maurice Leblanc
- Lupin III (character), gentleman thief in the Lupin III media franchise
- Remus Lupin, member of the Order of the Phoenix in the Harry Potter series
- Paul Toledo "Lupin", a commando in Commandos 2: Men of Courage video game
- Lupin Pooter, the son of the protagonist, in the 1892 novel The Diary of a Nobody by George and Weedon Grossmith

== Other ==
- Lupin Limited, an Indian multinational pharmaceutical company
- Lupin Mine, a gold mine in Nunavut, Canada
- Fort Lupin, an artillery battery in Charente-Maritime, France

== See also ==
- Arsène Lupin (disambiguation)
