= Marennes, Charente-Maritime =

Marennes
- Part of Marennes-Hiers-Brouage
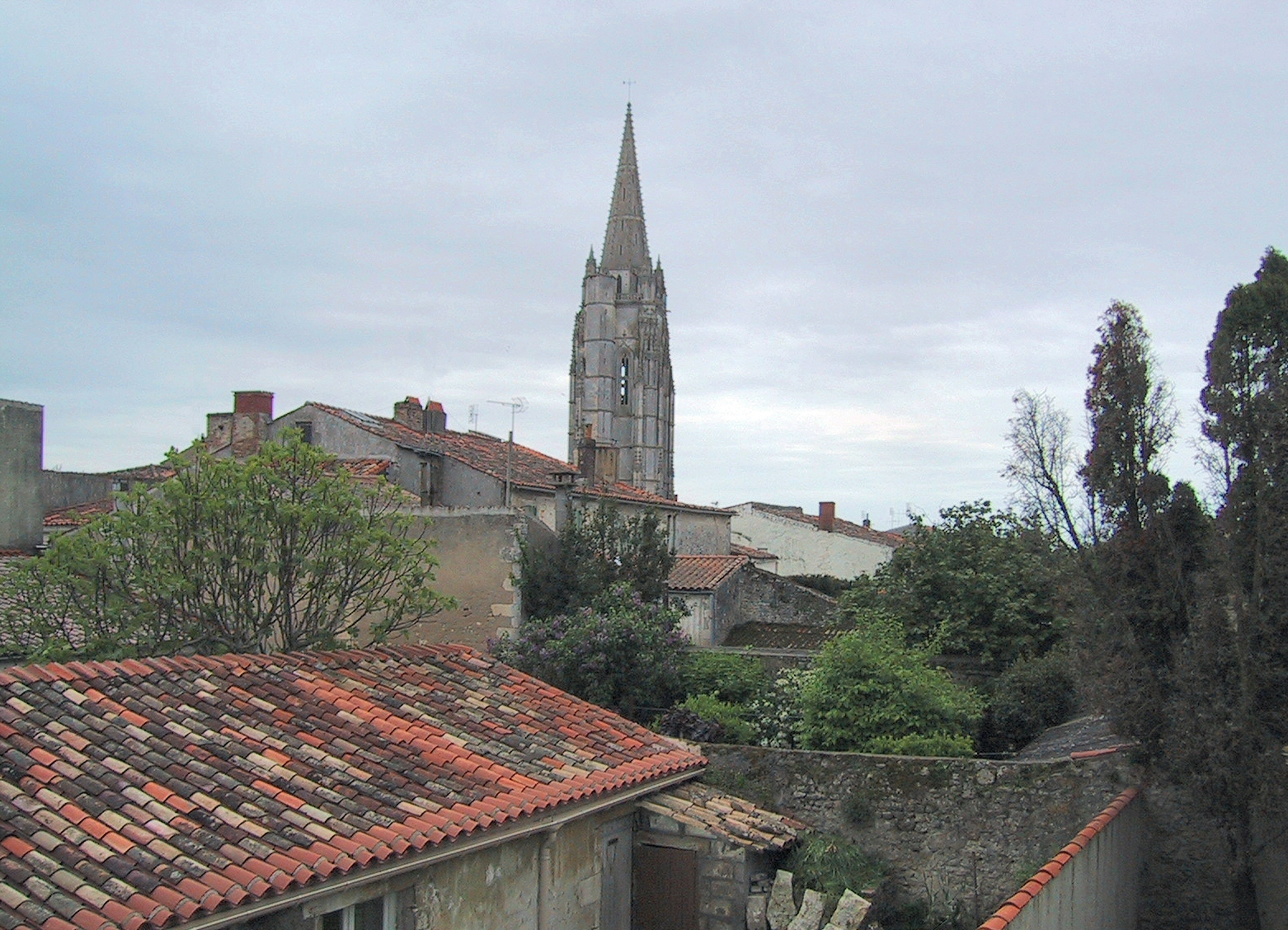

- Coat of arms
- Location of Marennes
- Location within France Location within Nouvelle-Aquitaine
- Coordinates: 45°49′21″N 1°06′19″W
- Country: France
- Region: Nouvelle-Aquitaine
- Department: Charente-Maritime
- Arrondissement: Rochefort
- Canton: Marennes
- Commune: Marennes-Hiers-Brouage
- Area^{1}: 20.09 km^{2} (7.76 sq mi)
- Highest elevation: 21 m (69 ft)
- Lowest elevation: 0 m (0 ft)
- Population (2022): 5,515
  - Density: 274.5/km^{2} (711.0/sq mi)
- Time zone: UTC+01:00 (CET)
  - Summer (DST): UTC+02:00 (CEST)
- Postal code: 17320
- ^{1} French Land Register data, which excludes lakes, ponds, glaciers > 1 km^{2} (0.386 sq mi or 247 acres) and river estuaries.

Marennes (French pronunciation: [maʁɛn]) is a former commune in the Charente-Maritime department, southwestern France. On 1 January 2019, it was merged into the new commune Marennes-Hiers-Brouage.

== History ==
For a long time it was one of the most prosperous cities of the Saintonge due to its location in the middle of the salt-water marshes at a time where salt was a valuable commodity. Marennes is a center for oyster farming.

== Population ==
The population data in the table below refer to the commune of Marennes proper, in its geography at the given years. In 1908, the commune of Bourcefranc-le-Chapus was created from part of Marennes.

Historical population

Year	Pop.	±% p.a.
1793	4,996	—
1800	4,633	−1.07%
1806	4,633	+0.00%
1821	4,193	−0.66%
1831	4,605	+0.94%
1836	4,542	−0.28%
1841	4,410	−0.59%
1846	4,542	+0.59%
1851	4,589	+0.21%
1856	4,508	−0.36%
1861	4,455	−0.24%
1866	4,426	−0.13%
1872	4,495	+0.26%
1876	4,565	+0.39%
1881	4,945	+1.61%
1886	4,766	−0.73%
1891	5,415	+2.59%
1896	6,293	+3.05%

Year	Pop.	±% p.a.
1901	6,459	+0.52%
1906	6,408	−0.16%
1911	4,519	−6.75%
1921	3,900	−1.46%
1926	4,082	+0.92%
1931	4,011	−0.35%
1936	3,957	−0.27%
1946	3,806	−0.39%
1954	3,829	+0.08%
1962	4,345	+1.59%
1968	4,443	+0.37%
1975	4,214	−0.75%
1982	4,549	+1.10%
1990	4,634	+0.23%
1999	4,685	+0.12%
2006	5,237	+1.60%
2022	5,515	+0.32%

Source: EHESS and INSEE (2006-2022)
