= Marennes-Hiers-Brouage =

- Commune
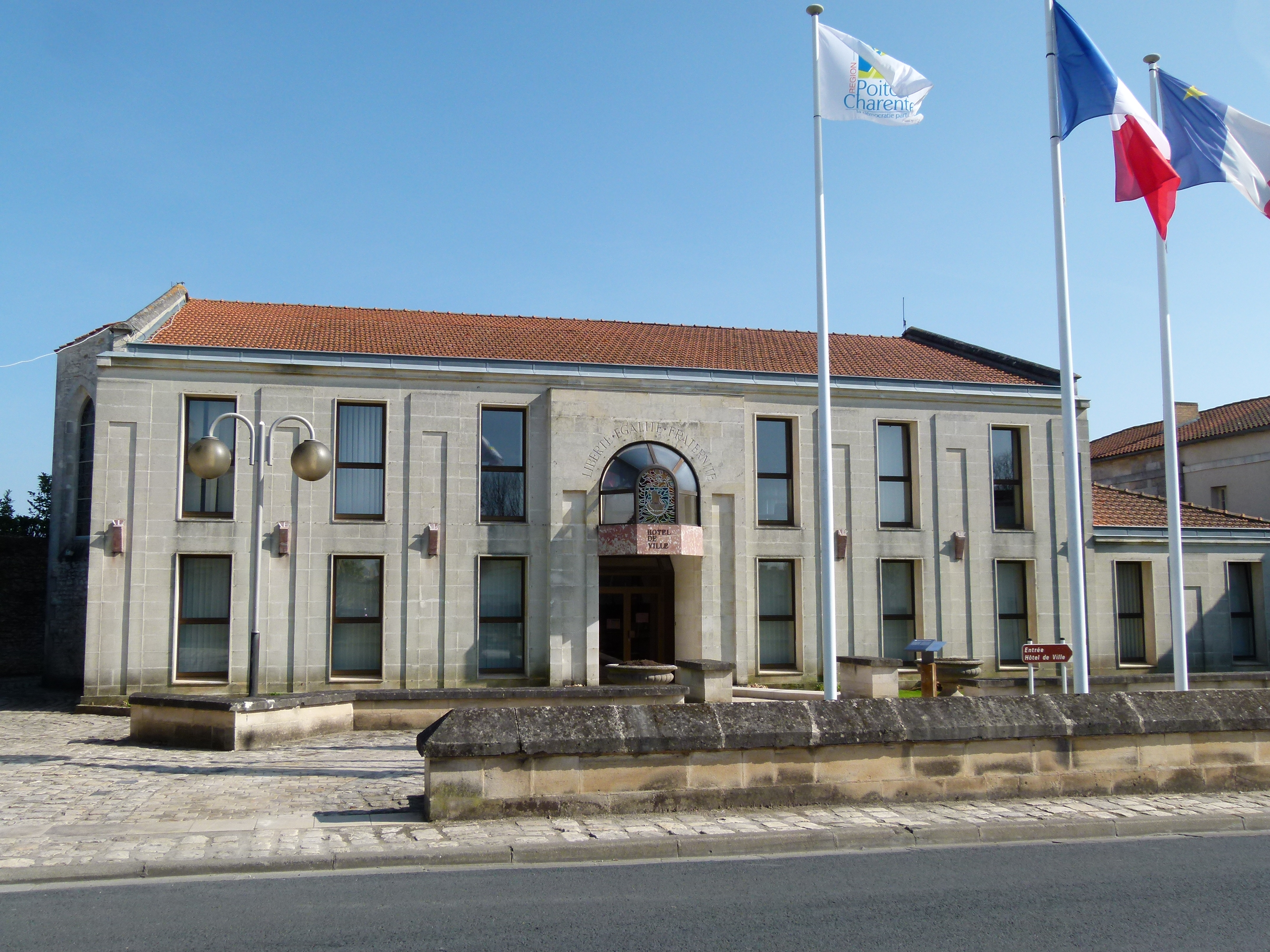
- The town hall in Marennes
- Location of Marennes-Hiers-Brouage
- Location within France Location within Nouvelle-Aquitaine
- Coordinates: 45°49′21″N 1°06′19″W
- Country: France
- Region: Nouvelle-Aquitaine
- Department: Charente-Maritime
- Arrondissement: Rochefort
- Canton: Marennes
- Intercommunality: Bassin de Marennes

Government
  - Mayor (2020–2026): Claude Balloteau
- Area^{1}: 51.44 km^{2} (19.86 sq mi)
- Highest elevation: 21 m (69 ft)
- Lowest elevation: 0 m (0 ft)
- Population (2023): 6,163
  - Density: 119.8/km^{2} (310.3/sq mi)
- Time zone: UTC+01:00 (CET)
  - Summer (DST): UTC+02:00 (CEST)
- INSEE/Postal code: 17219 /17320
- ^{1} French Land Register data, which excludes lakes, ponds, glaciers > 1 km^{2} (0.386 sq mi or 247 acres) and river estuaries.

Marennes-Hiers-Brouage (French pronunciation: [maʁɛn jɛʁs bʁuaʒ]) is a commune in the Charente-Maritime department in southwestern France. It was established on 1 January 2019 by merger of the former communes of Marennes (the seat) and Hiers-Brouage.

== Population ==
Population data refer to the commune in its geography as of January 2025.

Historical population
| Year | Pop. | ±% p.a. |
|---|---|---|
| 1968 | 4,962 | — |
| 1975 | 4,654 | −0.91% |
| 1982 | 5,025 | +1.10% |
| 1990 | 5,132 | +0.26% |
| 1999 | 5,157 | +0.05% |
| 2007 | 5,948 | +1.80% |
| 2012 | 6,264 | +1.04% |
| 2017 | 6,252 | −0.04% |
| 2023 | 6,163 | −0.24% |
Source: INSEE

== See also ==
- Communes of the Charente-Maritime department
