= Lupin the Third (disambiguation) =

Lupin the Third, Lupin III, or Lupin the 3rd is a Japanese media franchise.

Lupin the Third may also refer to:

- Lupin III (manga), the original manga series
- Lupin III (character), the franchise's titular character
- Lupin the 3rd Part I, the first anime television series, originally broadcast as simply Lupin III
- Lupin the 3rd Part II, the second anime television series, originally broadcast as simply Lupin III
- Lupin the 3rd: The Mystery of Mamo, a 1978 anime film, originally titled simply Lupin III
- Lupin the 3rd (film), a 2014 live action film

== See also ==
- List of Lupin the Third video games, some of which are titled simply Lupin the Third
