= Fort Lupin =

- Saint-Nazaire-sur-Charente, Charente-Maritime, France
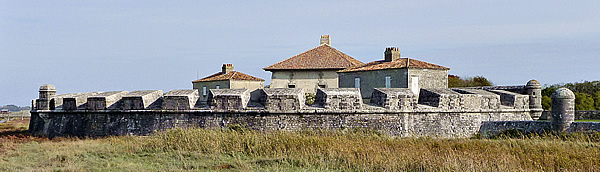
- Embrasures of Fort Lupin

Site information
- Type: Artillery battery
- Owner: Private
- Open to the public: No
- Condition: Intact

Location
- Coordinates: 45°57′26.9″N 1°1′57.9″W

Site history
- Built: 1683–1686
- Built by: Kingdom of France
- In use: 1686–19th century

Fort Lupin, also known as Fort de la Charente, is an artillery battery in Saint-Nazaire-sur-Charente, in the department of Charente-Maritime, France. It was built in the 1680s to a design by Sébastien Le Prestre de Vauban, and it is now in good condition.

== History ==
Fort Lupin was built on the southern bank of the Charente, and commanded the approach to Rochefort and its arsenal along with Fort Lapointe on the opposite bank of the river.

Its construction was decided on by Louis XIV in 1683, so as to complete the defensive set-up protecting the arsenal of Rochefort.

The first proposal to build a fortification in the area was made in 1672 by the engineer La Favolliere, and it was eventually built between 1683 and 1686. It was completed in 1689, at the start of the war of the League of Augsburg.The fort's initial design was made by François Ferry, but the plans were extensively modified by Sébastien Le Prestre de Vauban, who reduced its size due to a lack of funds.

The fort consists of a semi-circular gun battery ringed by a parapet with twenty-two embrasures. A tour-réduit and two blockhouses are located at the gorge. The fort is further protected by a ditch, a covertway and a glacis.

Fort Lupin was never attacked, and it never fired its guns in anger. It was decommissioned in the late 19th century, and was subsequently abandoned and vandalized.

The fort was classified as a monument historique on 26 June 1950, and was sold to a private owner in 1964. The owners have restored the fort, and today it is in good condition. It is not open to the public on a regular basis.

== Gallery ==
Views of Fort Lupin
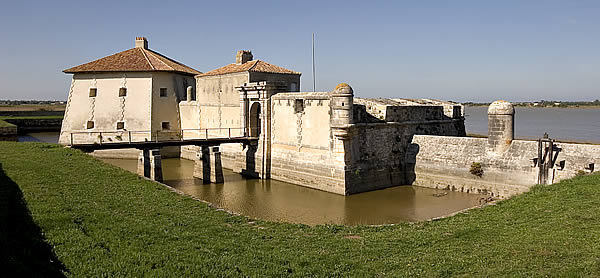
View from the east

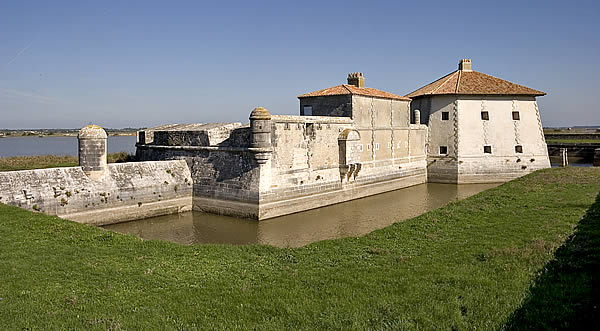
View from the west

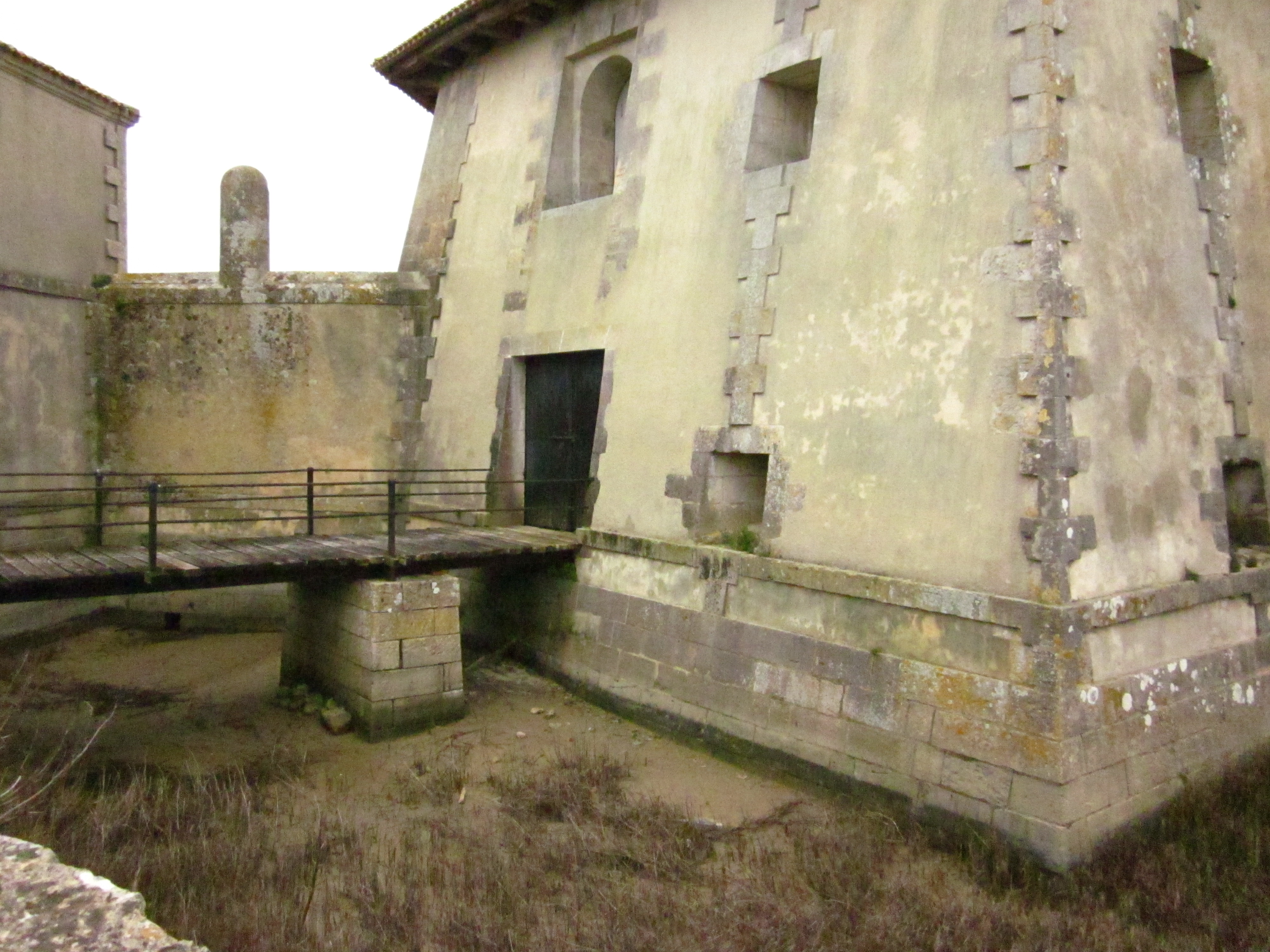
The tour-réduit

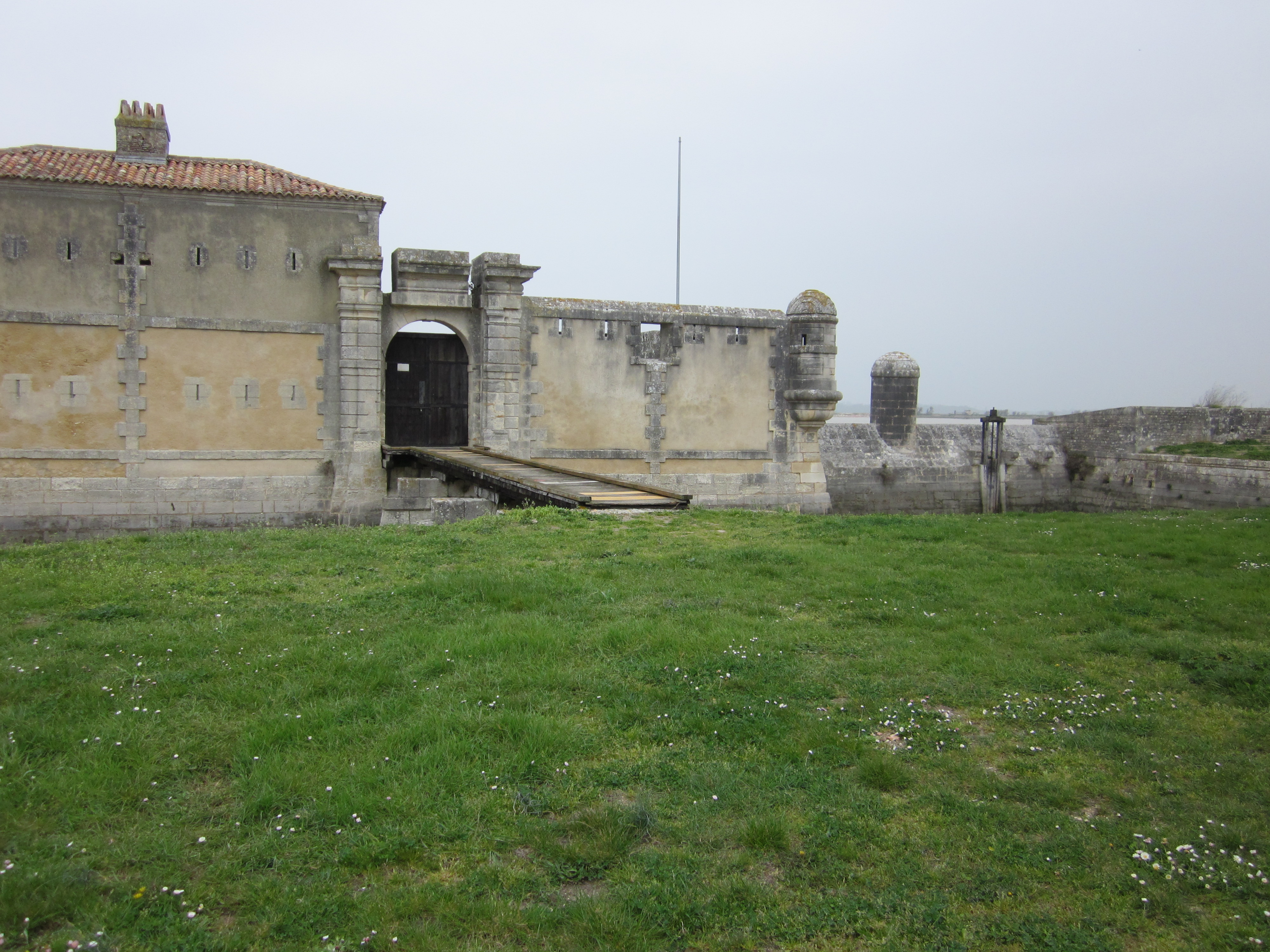
The gate as seen from the glacis

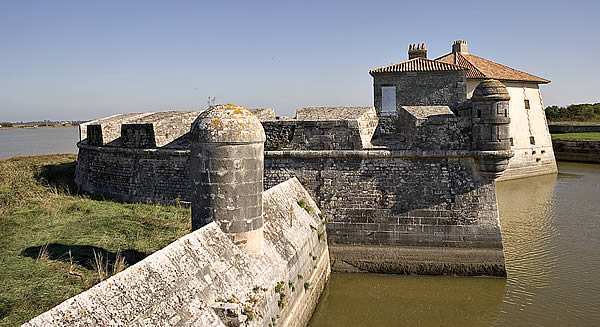
View of the fort and its ditch
