= Canton of Aigrefeuille-d'Aunis =

Coordinates: 46°05′N 0°54′W

Aigrefeuille-d'Aunis
- Former canton
- Interactive map of Aigrefeuille-d'Aunis
- Country: France
- Region: Nouvelle-Aquitaine
- Department: Charente-Maritime
- No. of communes: {{{nbcomm}}}
- Disbanded: 2015
- Area: 180.57 km^{2} (69.72 sq mi)
- Population (2012): 14,310
  - Density: 79.25/km^{2} (205.3/sq mi)

The Canton of Aigrefeuille-d'Aunis is a former canton of the Charente-Maritime department, in France. It was disbanded following the French canton reorganisation which came into effect in March 2015. It had 14,310 inhabitants (2012). The lowest point was in the commune of Ardillières, the highest point was Le Thou at 48 m, the average elevation was 16 m.

== Communes ==
The canton comprised the following communes:

- Aigrefeuille-d'Aunis
- Ardillières
- Ballon
- Bouhet
- Chambon
- Ciré-d'Aunis
- Forges
- Landrais
- Thairé
- Le Thou
- Virson

== Population history ==
Year	Population
1962	6,747
1968	7,209
1972	7,604
1982	8,965
1990	9,362
1999	10,272
2008	13,220
2012	14,310

== See also ==
- Cantons of the Charente-Maritime department
