= Forges, Charente-Maritime =

Forges
- Commune
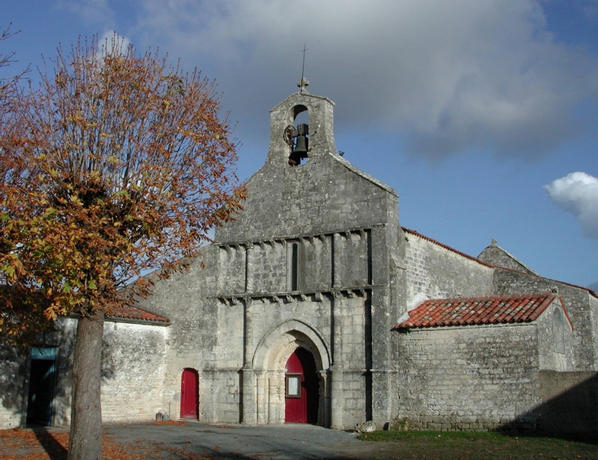
- The church in Forges
- Location of Forges
- Location within France Location within Nouvelle-Aquitaine
- Coordinates: 46°06′20″N 0°53′39″W
- Country: France
- Region: Nouvelle-Aquitaine
- Department: Charente-Maritime
- Arrondissement: Rochefort
- Canton: Surgères
- Intercommunality: Aunis Sud

Government
  - Mayor (2020–2026): Micheline Bernard
- Area^{1}: 13.58 km^{2} (5.24 sq mi)
- Elevation: 11 m (36 ft)
- Highest elevation: 13 m (43 ft)
- Lowest elevation: 12 m (39 ft)
- Population (2023): 1,308
  - Density: 96.32/km^{2} (249.5/sq mi)
- Time zone: UTC+01:00 (CET)
  - Summer (DST): UTC+02:00 (CEST)
- INSEE/Postal code: 17166 /17290
- ^{1} French Land Register data, which excludes lakes, ponds, glaciers > 1 km^{2} (0.386 sq mi or 247 acres) and river estuaries.

Forges (French pronunciation: [fɔʁʒ]) is a commune in the Charente-Maritime department in the Nouvelle-Aquitaine region in southwestern France.

== Geography ==
Forges is located about 24 kilometres (15 mi) east of La Rochelle in the historic region of Aunis. The commune is bordered by Virson to the north, Chambon to the east and northeast, Landrais to the south and southeast, Le Thou to the southwest, and Aigrefeuille-d'Aunis to the west.

== Population ==
Historical population
Year	Pop.	±% p.a.
1968	718	—
1975	714	−0.08%
1982	805	+1.73%
1990	786	−0.30%
1999	903	+1.55%
2007	1,119	+2.72%
2012	1,224	+1.81%
2017	1,301	+1.23%
2023	1,308	+0.09%
Source: INSEE

== See also ==
- Communes of the Charente-Maritime department
