= Aigrefeuille-d'Aunis =

- Commune
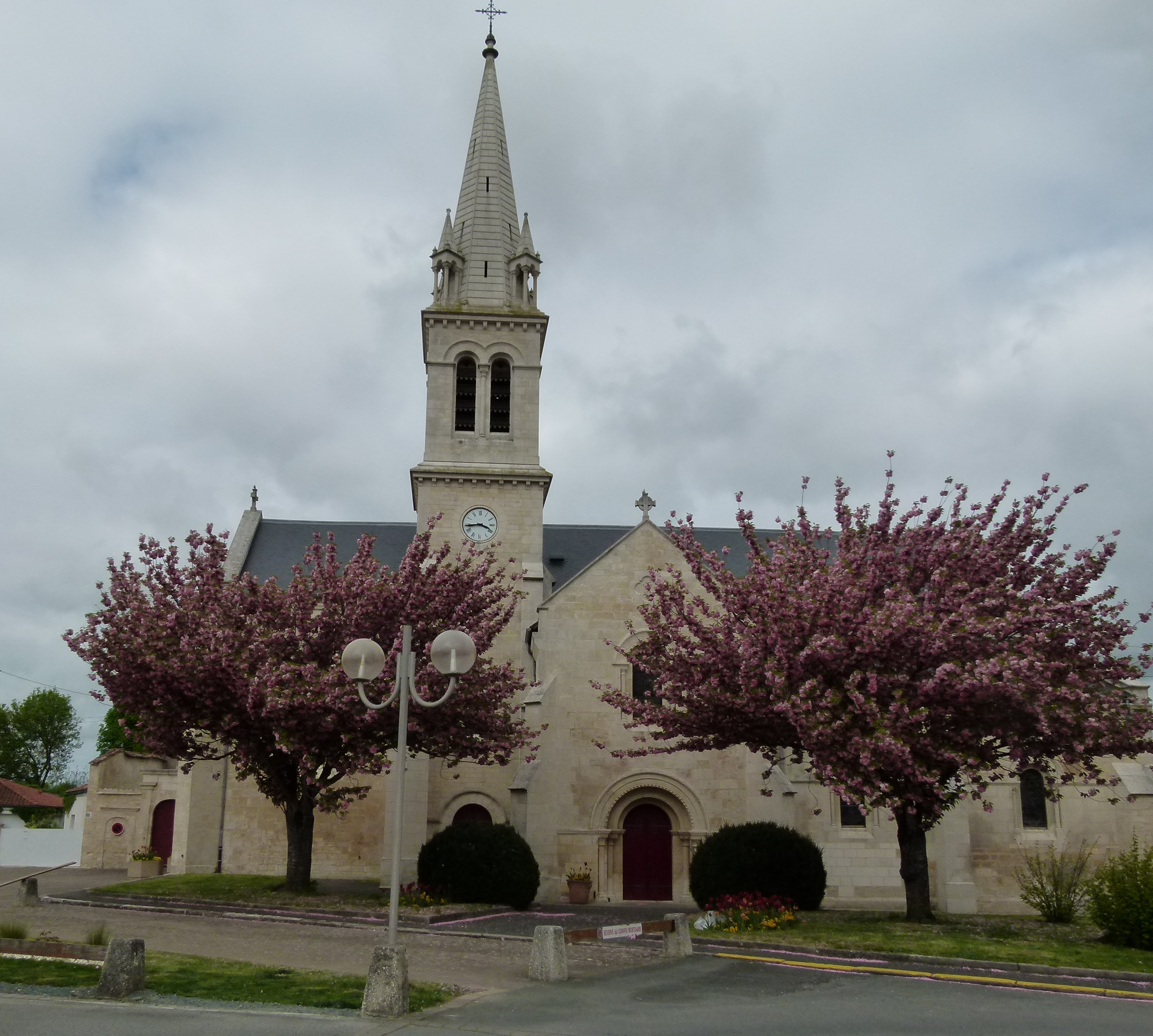
- The church in Aigrefeuille-d'Aunis

- Coat of arms
- Location of Aigrefeuille-d'Aunis
- Location within France Location within Nouvelle-Aquitaine
- Coordinates: 46°07′00″N 0°55′57″W
- Country: France
- Region: Nouvelle-Aquitaine
- Department: Charente-Maritime
- Arrondissement: Rochefort
- Canton: Surgères
- Intercommunality: Aunis Sud

Government
  - Mayor (2020–2026): Gilles Gay
- Area^{1}: 16.76 km^{2} (6.47 sq mi)
- Elevation: 18 m (59 ft)
- Highest elevation: 38 m (125 ft)
- Lowest elevation: 12 m (39 ft)
- Population (2023): 4,677
  - Density: 279.1/km^{2} (722.8/sq mi)
- Time zone: UTC+01:00 (CET)
  - Summer (DST): UTC+02:00 (CEST)
- INSEE/Postal code: 17003 /17290
- ^{1} French Land Register data, which excludes lakes, ponds, glaciers > 1 km^{2} (0.386 sq mi or 247 acres) and river estuaries.

Aigrefeuille-d'Aunis is a commune in the Charente-Maritime department in the Nouvelle-Aquitaine region of south-western France.

By population as well as by economic weight, it is one of the three main urban centres of the Pays d'Aunis along with Surgères and Marans.

The commune has been awarded one flower by the National Council of Towns and Villages in Bloom in the Competition of cities and villages in Bloom.

== Geography ==
=== Geographical description ===
The location of Aigrefeuille-d'Aunis in Charente-Maritime

Aigrefeuille d'Aunis is a small town of 4,677 inhabitants (2023), located in the northwest quarter of the department of Charente-Maritime, in the region of Aunis, 25 km east of La Rochelle, 22 km north of Rochefort and 15 km west of Surgères. (Note: Distance between town centres as shown in the Michelin Road Maps for Charente, Charente-Maritime, n°324, Edition 6 – 2008)

=== Serving the city ===
The commune of Aigrefeuille d'Aunis is traversed south of the urban area by the Highway D939 which connects La Rochelle to Périgueux, via Surgères and Angoulême. (Note: This is the former NR139. This route is also the old Royal Route from Périgueux to La Rochelle, as it was until the end of the July Monarchy. It was then the old Imperial Route 139 during the Second Empire)

The commune is connected to Rochefort by the main road D5 which follows the old railway line (closed in 1953). (Note: Gérard Blier, History of Transport in Charente-Maritime, Le Croît Vif, études documentaires, 2003, p. 132. This "new" route, for that era, directly linked Aigrefeuille-d'Aunis to Rochefort, while the "Ancient Route", Highway D116, passed through Le Thou and rejoined at Puydrouard (commune of Forges. The inhabitants had to pass these villages to get to Rochefort, so they did not catch the train. The D116, which was more-or-less parallel to the old way, was made a "declassified" road to the benefit of the D5. Reported in the Michelin Route Map – Charente, Charente-Maritime, n°324, édition 6 – 2008 (in French))

Aigrefeuille d'Aunis is traversed in the south of the urban area by the Poitiers-La Rochelle railway line. It is double tracked and was electrified in 1993 to allow passage of the TGV to La Rochelle Station.

=== Villages, localities and distances in the commune ===
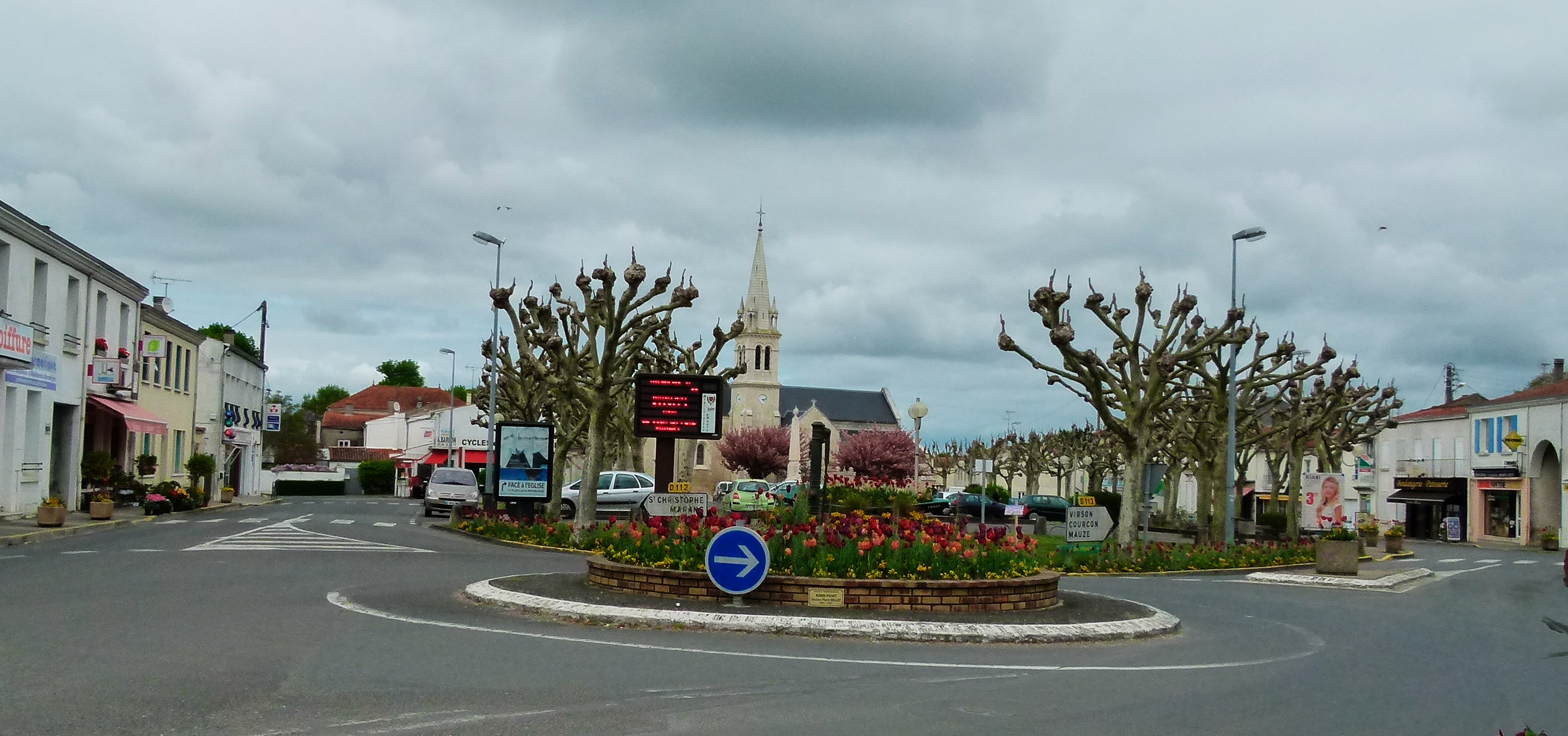
Place de la Republic, the centre of Aigrefeuille d'Aunis and the nerve centre of the city.

The commune of Aigrefeuille d'Aunis officially became an urban commune after the population census of 1982.

In his communal notice that he issued for Aigrefeuille, M. A. Gautier informed his contemporaries that the commune had ten villages and eight hamlets, besides the town, a situation that stood in 1839.

Today, around Aigrefeuille the villages of La Taillee, and Bois-Gaillard are clustered on the right bank of the Virson stream. On the left bank in the south-west is the large village of La Fragnée and on the right bank is the village of Le Pere.

In the south, the village Le Grand Chemin establishes a connection between the urban residential area of Aigrefeuille, the industrial area of Fief-Girard, and the station district along the Avenue d'Aunis, itself extended by the Grand Chemin.

In the Southeast of the conurbation and separated by the small rustic wooded valley of Virson, the residential areas have spread around the ancient village of L'Angle and have merged with the villages of Bois-Gaillard and La Taillée.

To the northeast of Aigrefeuille is the village of Frace, which gave its name to the lake, gradually submerged by two major urban housing estates (Le Hameau du Lac and Le Fief des Dames).

Away from the central urban area, in the south-east, is another large village called La Planterie. The latter is located between Puydrouard, a large village in the neighbouring commune of Forges, and the conurbation of Aigrefeuille d'Aunis.

At the northern edge of the commune and straddling the commune boundary, there is a small area called Panonnière. It is located on a small hill facing the small neighbouring commune of Virson.

Just west of the commune and adjacent to Croix-Chapeau, is the former NATO military hospital complex of which was closed in 1967 and since has been transformed into a business area: the Grands Champs zone, which extends over 56 hectares.

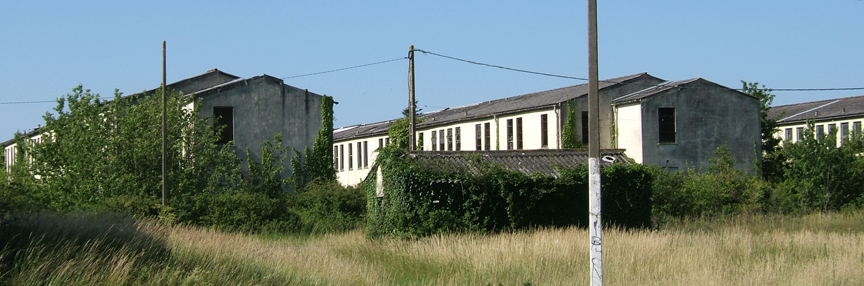
Former NATO military hospital complex

=== Location and surrounding communities ===
Six communes have boundaries with the Aigrefeuille d'Aunis, all these communes are located in the department of Charente-Maritime.

The three major cities closest to Aigrefeuille d'Aunis are to the west: La Rochelle, south: Rochefort, and east: Surgères all the cities of Aunis are located in the northwest of the Charente-Maritime.

=== Geology, topography and natural landscapes ===
The extent of the communal, with a total area of 1676 hectares, is entirely within the limestone plain of Aunis which is located to the north of the Little Flanders marsh, a part of the Rochefort marshes.

The entire commune of Aigrefeuille d'Aunis is located on Jurassic sediments, which cover the entire plain of Aunis and extend into Angoumois north of the Charente river. Late Jurassic Limestone and marl outcrops appear clearly on the surface of the hilly part of the commune, while in the small depression which corresponds to the upstream part of the valley of Virson, are deposits from the Quaternary period. These are sedimentary deposits of fluvio-marine origin from the Flandrian transgression which were covered by further formations, specifically peat, due to congestion and stagnation of watercourses. There are many peat bogs east of the communal territory extending into the neighbouring commune of Forges.

The town has very little relief with the average altitude being 25 metres – ranging from the lowest point of 12 metres at Lake Frace, to the highest point of 38 metres at the small hill, between the site of Pannonière and the low hills in the commune of Saint-Christophe, north of Aigrefeuille d'Aunis.

All of the commune is located in a flat area, with wide horizons, yielding a landscape based on the open field system characteristic of farming in Europe. Aigrefeuille d'Aunis is located in the heart of the cereal plain of Aunis, which is reminiscent of Beauce.

The commune is still quite wooded in parts – e.g. the leisure site at Lake Frace, the wooded banks of the Virson stream between the villages of La Fragnée and Le Pere, and the tourist site of La Taillée.

=== Hydrography ===
The city of Aigrefeuille d'Aunis occupies a depression which in medieval times was a floodplain, formed of marshes and peat conducive to forests composed mainly of trees that prefer a damp environment (alder and ash in particular). The commune is traversed in its entire length from south-west to north-east by the branches of a small stream, the Virson. This continues its course towards the north-east of the plain of Aunis and swollen by waters of several other streams, becomes a small watercourse in the eponymous village of Virson and joined on its left side by the Curé, a small coastal river that flows into the Bay of Aiguillon south of the estuary of the Sèvre.

Inside the commune of Aigrefeuille d'Aunis, the many branches of the Virson are the origin of a small river, one of whose arms forms the communal boundary with the commune of Forges to the east, while another branch takes its source from a lake area that feeds Lake Frace. This lakeside site, located northeast of the city, is in fact composed of two interconnected ponds.

Finally, the importance of this stream comes from the fact that it was used to secure the habitat and human activities in the commune since medieval times. Thus, the town of Aigrefeuille and the villages and hamlets of La Fragnée, Le Pere, La Taillée, Bois-Gaillard, and Frace, have developed on either side of the river all along its course.

=== Climate ===
The climate is an oceanic climate: the rainfall is relatively high in autumn and winter and the winters are mild. The summer is tempered by the sea breeze. Two winds from the ocean, the "noroît" and the "suroît", blow on the coast of the department. The sunshine of the Charente coast averages 2,250 hours per year which is comparable to that experienced by parts of the Mediterranean coast.

The records of the meteorological station of La Rochelle between 1946 and 2000 allow the determination of some key dates for the climate perspective in Charente-Maritime:

- the coldest recorded temperature was on 15 February 1956: −13.6 °C.
- the highest recorded temperature (exceeded only during the 2003 heat wave) was reached on 8 July 1982 with nearly 39 °C in the shade.

1953 was the driest year and 2000 was the wettest.

The Charente-Maritime is the French department, which was hardest hit by Hurricane Martin on 27 December 1999. National records recorded winds of 198 km/h on Oleron island and 194 km/h in Royan.

Comparison of local Meteorological data with other cities in France
Town	Sunshine (hours/yr)	Rain (mm/yr)	Snow (days/yr)	Storm (days/yr)	Fog (days/yr)
National average	1,973	770	14	22	40
Aigrefeuille-d'Aunis	2,118	759	3	14	22
Paris	1,661	637	12	18	10
Nice	2,724	767	1	29	1
Strasbourg	1,693	665	29	29	56
Brest	1,605	1,211	7	12	75

== Toponymy ==
The original village was called Agrifolio "medieval", demonstrating a forestry origin, whose traces in toponymy can be found elsewhere in many localities of the commune: Frace, La Fragnée, La Taillée, Le Bois-Gaillard, Le Bois-de-la-Touche, Le Quéreux-Fresne.

The modern name of the city is derived from a logical linguistic evolution of the Latin acrifolium meaning "Holly". Actually the first houses of the original hamlet were built near a wood where there was abundant holly.

This forestry origin of the village also recalls that the old parish belonged to the ancient Forest of Argenson. The Forest of Benon is a modern vestige of this forest.

In another indication, the name of the city originates from acid grass that are found in abundance on the peat land of the commune: "The ebb of the ocean allowed these plants to spread on the water. The decomposition of organic materials then formed a thick layer of peat on which grew a sour acid grass, and thorny leafed trees, hence the name of Aigrefeuille".

== History ==
=== Medieval Origins ===
Although in Gallo-Roman times, a Roman road ran to the south of Aigrefeuille, no evidence of human occupation of this time was noted there. It was not until the period of the High Middle Ages that the first traces can be found. This Roman road was called "Le Grand Chemin" (The Great Way) and is well documented in the Table of Peutinger and archaeological excavations connected Angériacum to the current Saint-Jean d'Angely, which is the presumed site of the Port du Plomb at L'Houmeau via Muron and Le Thou.

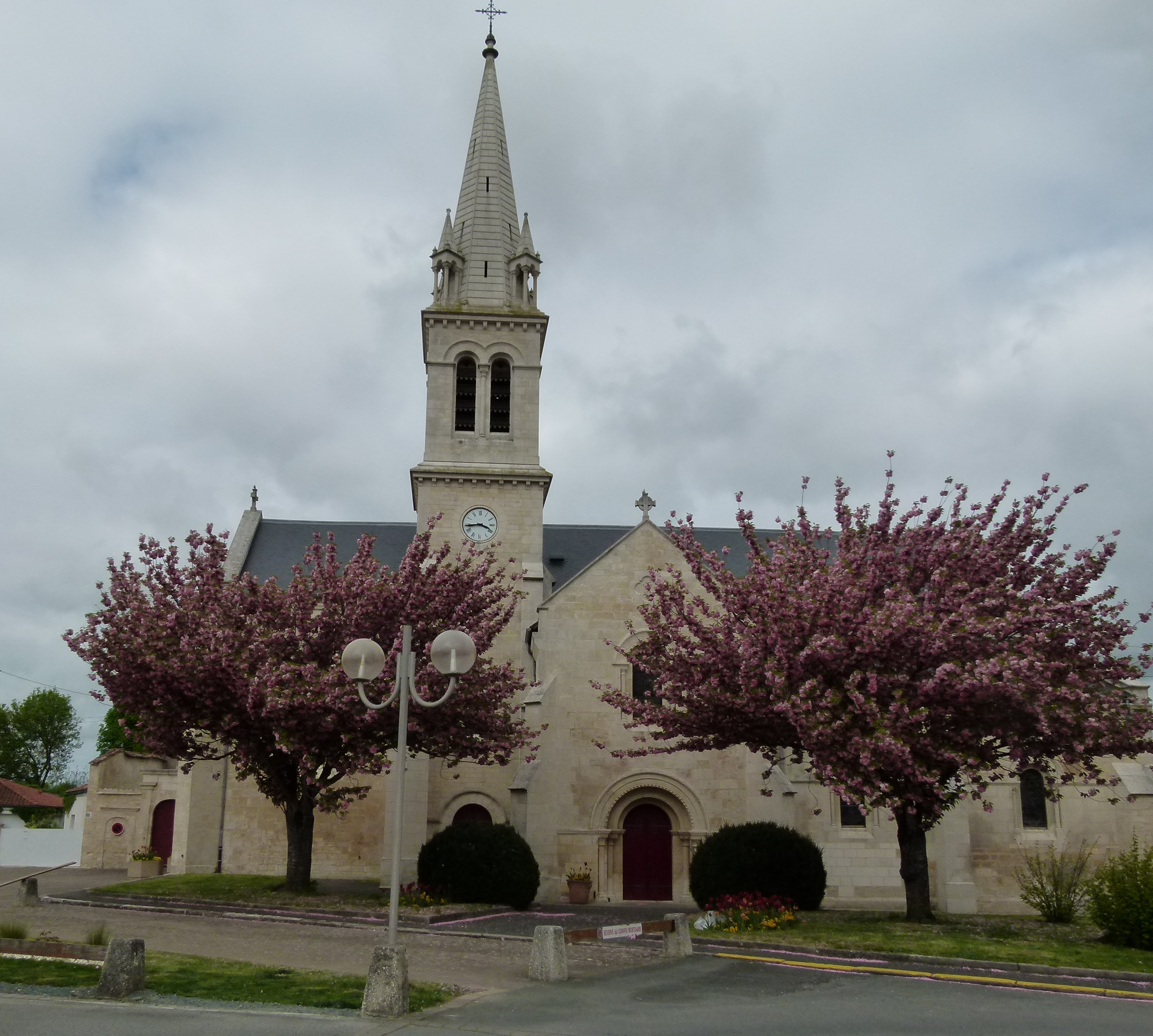
The church of Saint-Étienne is the oldest building in Aigrefeuille d'Aunis.

Thus, the earliest known traces of Aigrefeuille d'Aunis are from the early medieval period, i.e. the 12th century: almost the same time as that of La Rochelle, following the fall of Châtelaillon in 1130. Aigrefeuille d'Aunis is a medieval creation, following the period of the great forest clearing of the Middle Ages.

The region of Aunis, being heavily wooded, was cleared very late, from only the 11th to the 12th centuries and this was a measure of the population increase and the prosperity of the vineyards. A witness to this evolution was the Saint-Étienne church, which was built in the middle of the 12th century in the heart of the original village but rebuilt several times in the Middle Ages, particularly in 1360 and especially the 15th century, when it was restored and strengthened after the Hundred Years' War.

In the Middle Ages, Aigrefeuille d'Aunis was at the centre of a large clearing in the forest. The ancient Forest of Argenson, which separated the old provinces of Aunis and Poitou, was gradually reduced and extensive clearings were carried out mainly for vineyards which, at Aigrefeuille, were at the southern limit of the plain of Aunis.

At the turn of the 13th century, Aigrefeuille became a lordship that had already acquired a certain importance in Aunis, and the lord, Guillaume Maingot, was sire of Surgères. He was also the first known lord of Aigrefeuille. Aigrefeuille was then a "considerable parish of Aunis and one of the oldest Châtelains of the barony of Surgères with the right of "chasteau" and a fortress with high, medium, and low jurisdiction, honorific rights and the first bench in the church". It was from this time that the village became a busy market, since before the 15th century it had already received approval to build a hall.

Nevertheless, Aigrefeuille became a viticultural parish which drew its fortunes and prosperity from its proximity to La Rochelle which was then a new commercial port from where the white wines of Aunis were exported to Flanders, England, and the Nordic countries. These white wines were already reputable in the 13th century.

=== Modern Era ===
The 16th and 17th centuries marked a pause in the expansion of the village which went into a long period of lethargy and decline.

The religious wars starting from the 1560s, the disastrous consequences of the Siege of La Rochelle in 1627–1628, then the exile of the Protestants, following the Revocation of the Edict of Nantes in 1685, had a lasting impact on Aigrefeuille and the region.

It was also a time of economic slump with a drop in sales of Aunis wines which competed with those from Bordeaux. Protestant families, many of whom were artisans and winemakers, fled the Aunis region. Because of religious persecution and the policy of ostracism initiated by King Louis XIV, many villages in Aunis, such as Aigrefeuille, were affected by the exodus of Protestants. The village was almost abandoned and in great poverty as was the church which, during the 17th century, was dilapidated and threatened with ruin.

The economic recovery in the long-battered region did not take place until the 18th century.

The town again became a prosperous town with the new growth of the vineyards. The Aunis vineyards enjoyed a remarkable conversion of production and became a great economic wealth: "From the list of grievances, it is estimated that at the end of the Ancien Régime, the vineyards occupied about a third of most of the parishes in Aunis".

This growth came from the mutation of the vineyards of Aunis, which had operated since the 16th century, to the production of brandy: "The slump of Aunis wine caused by strong competition from Bordeaux wine gave rise to the first distillations, learned from the Dutch. The Netherlands and the Baltic countries were the first lasting buyers of "vin brûlé" ("Mulled wine" or Brandewijn in Dutch) from Aunis. If vineyard production was important, it grew most often at the expense of other products: "The land around maritime activities stimulate production, supported by capital from a well-off society (from the bourgeoisie of La Rochelle) that marks the landscape footprint of these speculative activities. These speculative activities develop around the vine which, at the pace of growth of the trade in spirits, born during the 16th century, settled on all suitable land to accommodate it, sometimes to the detriment of other food-producing areas".

In addition to the expansion of the vine, growing cereals, wheat, and barley in particular, was well developed in the course of the 18th century. Several windmills were built during this century, including in the Village and on the road to Virson. Another windmill was built in stone during the 18th century: the Moulin du Vieox-Fief, which demonstrated a certain degree of opulence of the corporation of millers at the time.

The rise of Aigrefeuille during this period also came from its situation on the route from La Rochelle to Surgères; the village was served by a first class road, which corresponded to a paved road in the Généralité road network of Aunis and Saintonge.

At the dawn of the French Revolution, Aigrefeuille was a large rural parish, with more than a thousand inhabitants. In 1793, its population was 1,290 inhabitants. However, it was not accepted by the Constituent Assembly in 1790 to be designated as the capital of the Canton, which was Ciré until 1801.

=== The 19th century, the century of great changes ===
==== Aigrefeuille, capital of canton ====
The town of Aigrefeuille became the capital of the canton at the beginning of the 19th century, following the redistribution of the administrative map of the region in 1800. This administrative function was withdrawn from Ciré and from Benon. These two cantons were united in 1801 into one canton with the boundaries redefined.

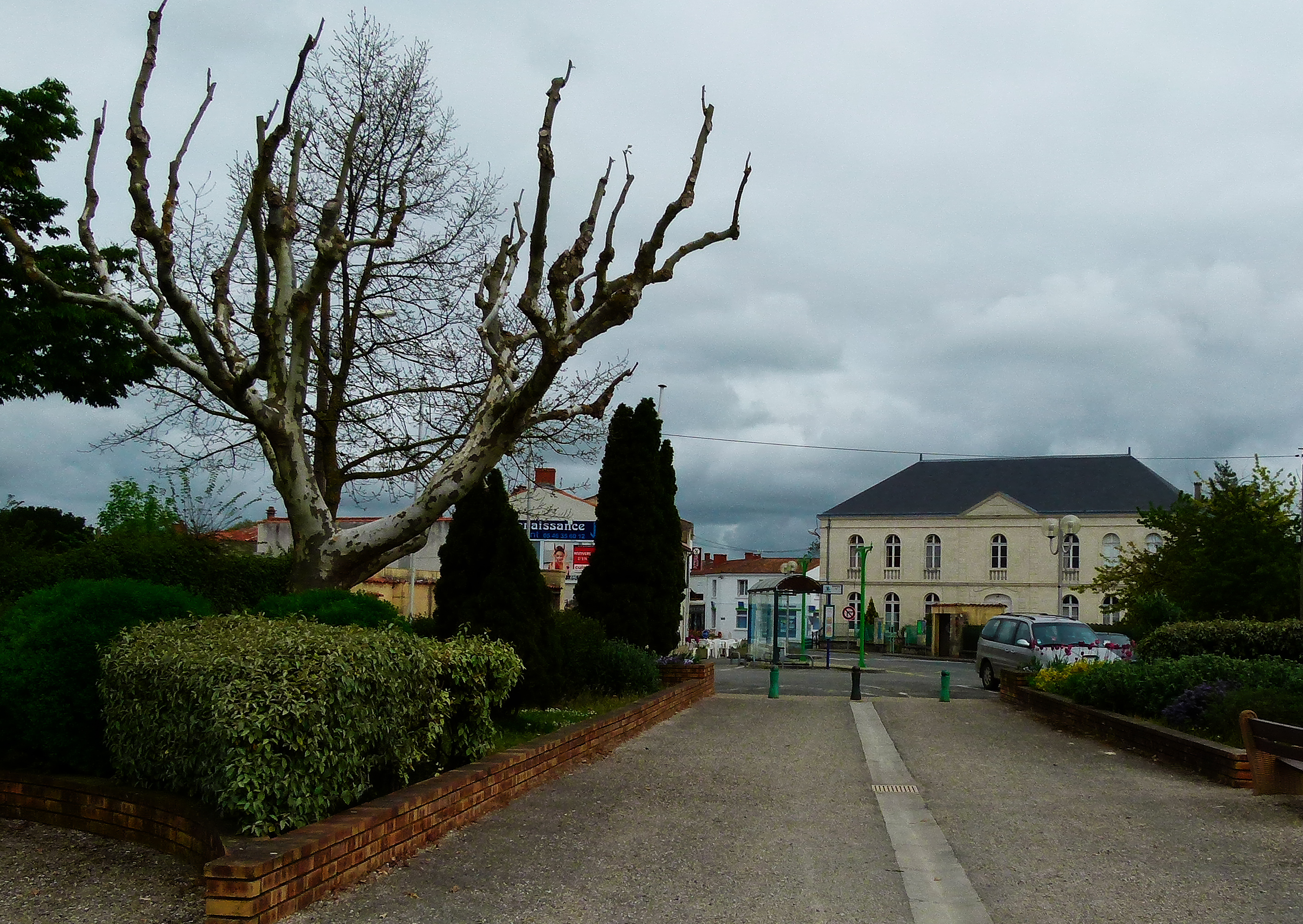
View of the city hall from the village hall and park. Aigrefeuille d'Aunis became the capital of the Canton in 1801.

The geographical criterion was little influence on the choice of Aigrefeuille as capital, since the town is not the centre of the canton. It was both because of its demographic weight and diversity of economic activities that the town was designated to be the new capital of a district then comprising fourteen communes. This new role put the tribunal of the justice of peace in the town, and the former constabulary building became a Police Station again as in the Napoleonic era.

At the end of the First Empire, the wealth of Aigrefeuille was based primarily on agriculture. The expansion of the vineyards was so great that it became a true monoculture until the crisis of phylloxera, which reached the vineyards of Aunis in 1876. The wine brought great prosperity to the commune and the countryside of Aunis.

If the town became a major centre of wine production in the first half of the 19th century, it was also a centre of small rural industries, with four windmills, two textile factories, a lime kiln, and the important mining of a peat bog which employed a large number of labourers. Peat Bogs in the commune were used particularly to supply several cognac distilleries in Aigrefeuille as wood, which was usually used in the "roasters", had become a rare commodity in Aunis.

At the beginning of the Second Empire, Aigrefeuille had 1,664 inhabitants – it had increased its population by more than one sixth since the beginning of the century when the town had 1,367 inhabitants. Meanwhile, the town recorded its first peak of population with 1,720 inhabitants recorded in 1836.

==== The "golden age" of the Second Empire ====
It was during the Second Empire that Aigrefeuille becomes a boom town and would experience a true "golden age."

Its industrial activities and especially its trading in spirits were stimulated by the introduction of the railway in 1857. The railway contributed to the making of some significant changes.

From September 1857, "it connects the two largest cities (Rochefort and La Rochelle) to the capital, thanks to the two lines that meet at Aigrefeuille and then join into the trunk line which continues towards Niort and Paris". Three rail lines traversed Aunis through Aigrefeuille: "Under the metal canopy Aigrefeuille station reigned a great deal of activity because it is the junction of the La Rochelle and Rochefort lines to Paris and the La Rochelle – Rochefort line; Nearby, a small locomotive depot meets the motive power needs".

Rail passenger traffic was double that of the active freight traffic and required a large footprint on the commune. Aigrefeuille quickly became a major railway centre with workshops for maintenance and repair of locomotives in the "roundhouse", a large semi-circular building housing the steam locomotives. This function of a junction and railway depot was completed by the installation of a gas plant and a gasometer followed by a water tower. The station at Aigrefeuille was particularly busy and important. It had three waiting rooms, a buffet, and even a library. It quickly became a new place of entertainment for the commune.

Throughout the period of the Second Empire, viticulture remained the dominant activity in Aigrefeuille, as in the rest of the canton. The town was the site of a new Cognac distillery which installed its cellars and warehouses in 1865 and made great strides, even after the crisis of phylloxera. This large distillery contributed to the reputation of the town by its brandy that was then called the "Aigrefeuille".

During the Second Empire, the commune, despite its economic prosperity, found its development contrasted with its demographics. Thus, from 1851 to 1861, the Aigrefeuille population grew quite strongly, reaching a second peak of population with 1,821 inhabitants in 1861.

This growth was in line with that of the canton and the department of Lower Charente, but the commune recorded in the next census a notable decline in population. Nevertheless, Aigrefeuille was still the first commune in its canton and was one of the largest rural communes of Aunis at the beginning of the Third Republic.

Despite a relatively stable population, a new urban fabric began to develop, especially around the new station area. From its medieval origins to the Second Empire, village life was organized primarily around the church and the adjoining square, the current Place de la Republique.

The installation of a religious boarding school in 1857, which was one of the first buildings to be built in the second half of the 19th century in Aigrefeuille, paved the way for urban planning work which also continued during the Third Republic.

During the Second Empire, the centre of the village began to change. A new square, surrounded by chestnut trees, was set up to accommodate a showground for livestock, and this business made Aigrefeuille one of the largest markets in Aunis.

In 1870 a new town hall was built with an adjoining boys' school. This stone building also housed the court of the justice of the peace and was the pride of the villagers.

New streets, including Avenue des Maronniers and Avenue d'Aunis, were pushed through as well as the Avenue de la Gare that opened onto the large stone building of the railway station. The latter, which was an attractive building with the whole length built on two levels, was set around a large square used for parking of motor vehicles and horse-drawn vehicles. The station quickly became a new place of attraction, especially during the "frairies": annual festivals that were organized on the site and attracted large crowds from surrounding communes.

==== The phylloxera crisis of 1876 ====
The outline of a new urban fabric, emerging from the Second Empire, continued during the Third Republic at least until the end of the 19th century. The transformation of the original village into a large rural town was progressively achieved with the construction of new public and religious buildings.

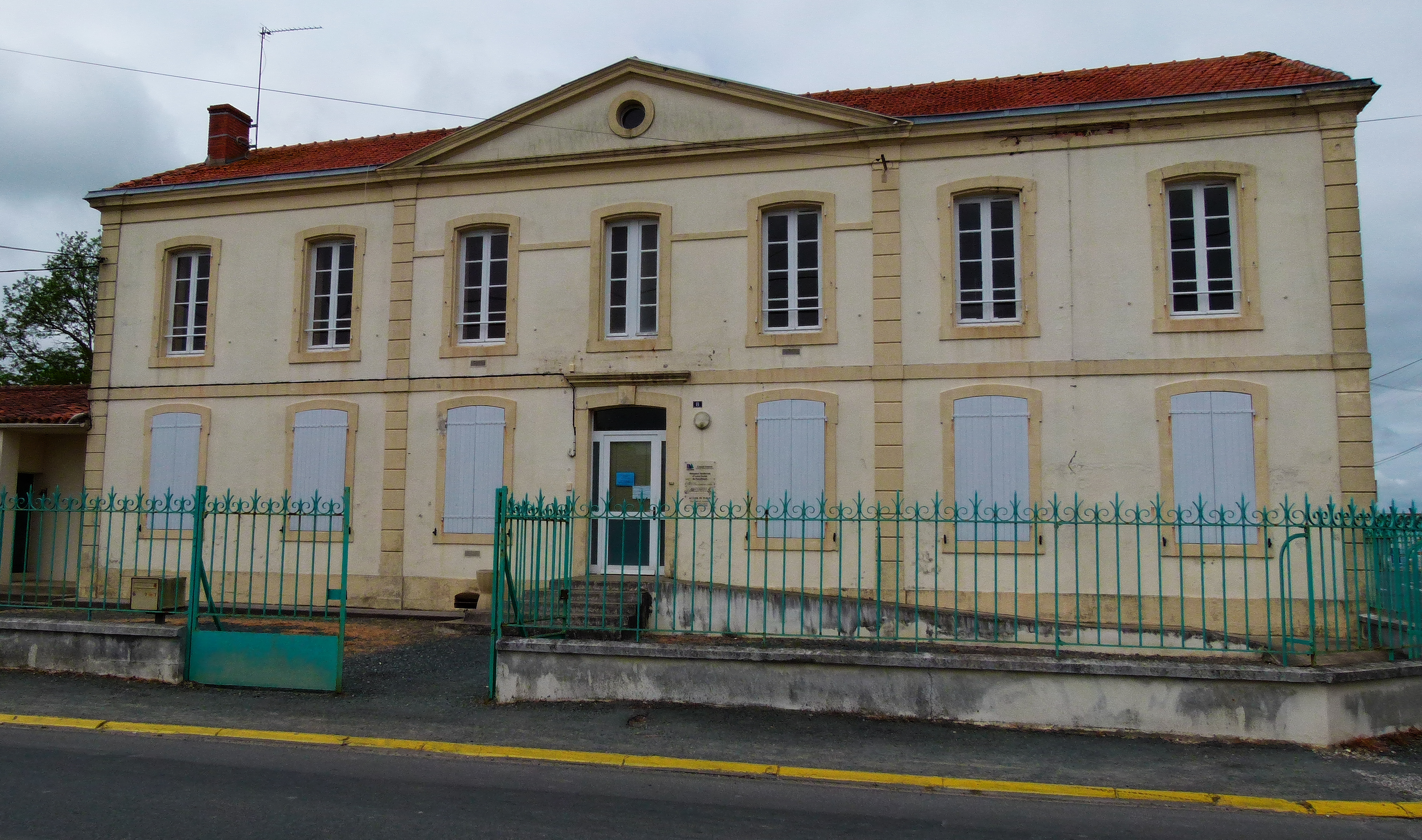
The building in cut stones of the constabulary was inaugurated in 1876.

In 1875 a chapel was built for the religious boarding school, followed a year later by the construction of the new police station. Finally, the church underwent a complete restoration in the late 19th century when the tower in particular was rebuilt and topped with a tall spire, a sign of local wealth. The work was completed in 1896.

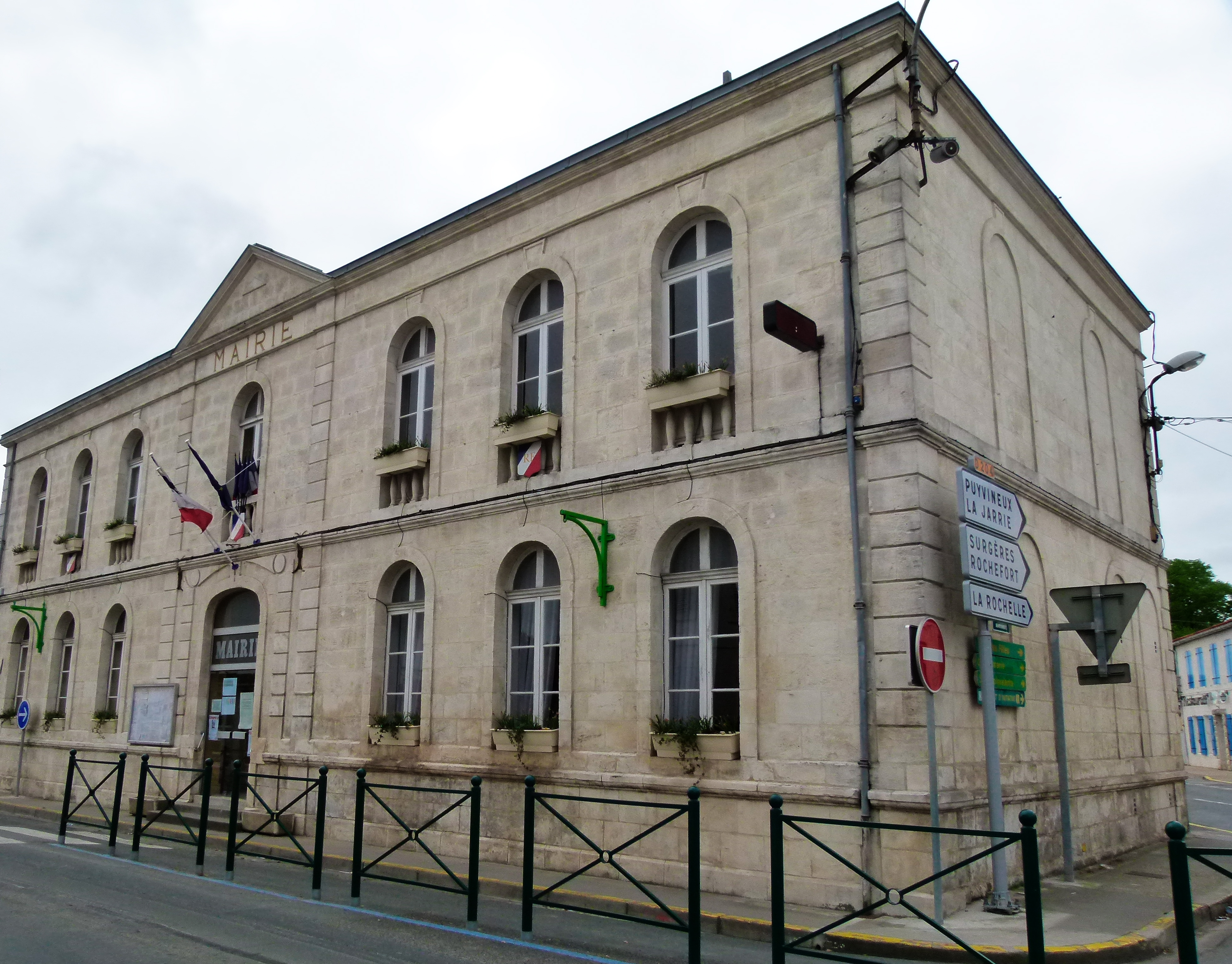
The commune took the name of Aigrefeuille d'Aunis on 11 September 1891.

The commune took the name of Aigrefeuille d'Aunis on 11 September 1891.

The commune had 1,648 inhabitants at that time and remained by far the largest town in the canton although its population had been in decline for more than a decade.

The crisis of phylloxera came in 1875 in the Saintonge vineyards, and the following year reached Aunis. This led to profound economic changes on the plain of Aunis where the vineyards were gradually abandoned.

They were replaced by forage crops for dairy farming. In Aunis, this new agricultural activity grew rapidly thanks to the powerful dairy cooperative movement begun in 1888 in Chaillé in the Commune of Saint-Georges-du-Bois which then spread to Saintonge and Poitou before the 20th century.

Together with dairy farming, cereal cropping also grew for which the cultivable land of the plain of Aunis is particularly well suited. Sugar beet, another crop which was very new for the region prospered in the late 19th century in Aunis, and especially in the Canton of Aigrefeuille d'Aunis.

Thus the city was able to successfully convert its viticulture economy by developing an agro-food industry with the cooperative dairy and the industrial distillery of sugar beet, while maintaining its cognac distillery, has acquired a high profile in the region.

According to demographic data from INSEE, the population peak came in 1876 with 1,881 inhabitants. It marked the maximum population of the commune in the 19th century that was not exceeded until 1968, nearly a century later.

=== Lethargy and renewal in the 20th century ===
At the beginning of the 20th century until after the Second World War, Aigrefeuille d'Aunis went into a long period of decline, resulting in the stagnation of economic activities and an almost continuous decline in population.

Aigrefeuille d'Aunis could not maintain its position as a railway junction. In October 1933, passenger and cargo traffic were finally stopped between Rochefort and Aigrefeuille d'Aunis. The activities of the locomotive depot gradually reduced and then the depot was dismantled.

The station could still accommodate passenger traffic on the railway line from Paris-La Rochelle, but it lost much of its importance, while the NR139 highway was moved further south, diverting transit traffic outside the town. Aigrefeuille thus lost the opportunity to develop a real rail and road intersection.

In addition, the diversification of industrial activities stopped in the commune. The abandonment of the beet sugar industry brought about the end of the distillery at the end of the 1930s.

The decline was amplified since the rural exodus initiated by the long crisis of phylloxera. Aigrefeuille d'Aunis did not escape this trend of rural decline and could not stop the depopulation of the township, which lasted until the Second World War. New economic activities were little source of employment, while the vineyards had required abundant labour.

Thus, the changing demographics of the commune of Aigrefeuille d'Aunis and its canton followed from the impact of the serious wine crisis, resulting in an almost continuous demographic decline from 1876 to 1946. During this period, the city recorded a dramatic decline in its population with a population loss of 607 inhabitants, a decrease of one-third of the population (-32.3%).

Moreover, this demographic decline was clearly felt in the cessation of planning work at the end of the 19th century. In the first half of the 20th century, Aigrefeuille d'Aunis entered a period of lethargy and the commune stagnated. The sumptuous period of major urban work undertaken during the second half of the 19th century which was a "golden age" for the town was over.

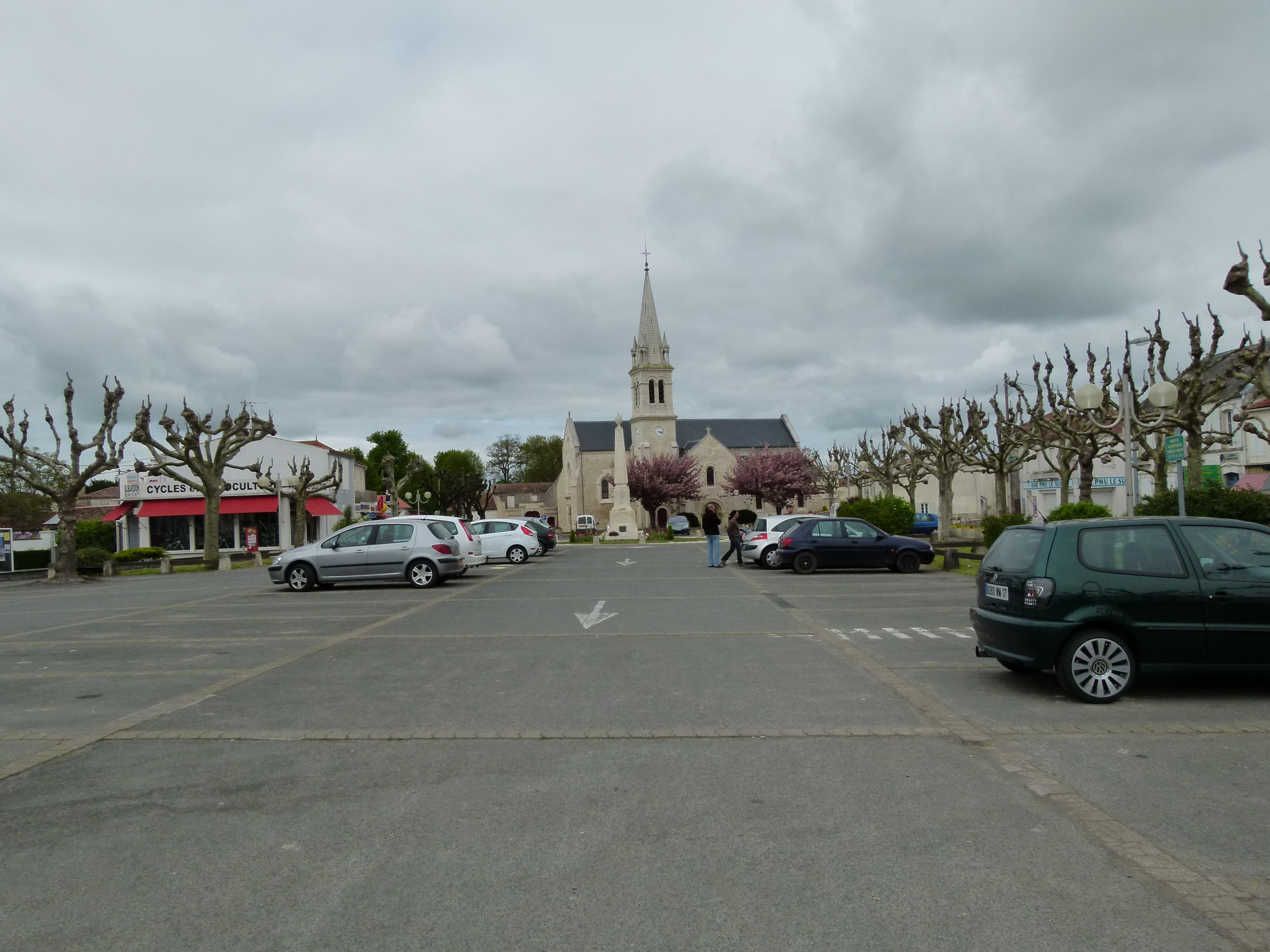
A view of the main square in the centre of the city.

At the end of the Second World War the town of Aigrefeuille d'Aunis was considerably damaged and its factories were largely destroyed (mills, dairy factory, beet distillery), as well as transport infrastructure (bridges over railway lines and the railway station district, roads, electric power grid).

It was only in the time after the Second World War that the city experienced a revival, based on economic and urban development, which significantly transformed the commune.

=== Heraldry ===
Arms of Aigrefeuille d'Aunis	Adopted by the Town Council in 1980. The town holds the Croix de guerre 1939–1945 (France) Blazon: Gules, a partridge crowned in Or.

== Economy ==
Aigrefeuille d'Aunis is a small city and an urban centre in Pays d'Aunis. It is complementary to Surgères, and serves as a relay centre vis-à-vis its larger neighbour, La Rochelle on which, in many ways, it is dependent.

=== A structured urban centre in Aunis country ===
Aigrefeuille d'Aunis is one of the three urban centres forming the structure of Aunis country together with Surgères (about 6000 inhabitants) and Marans (about 5000 inhabitants).

Employment in the commune is shown in the following table:

Sectors of Activity in Aigrefeuille-d'Aunis in 2017

Economic Sector	No. of Employees	Percentage
Primary Sector	15	0.9%
Industrial Sector	407	24.9%
Construction	120	7.3%
Trade, Transport & Services	606	37.1%
Administrations, Education, Health	485	29.7%
Total Employed	1,632	100%

As shown in the above table, industrial employment is important in Aigrefeuille d'Aunis which can be called an "industrial centre" although the tertiary sector (trade, services, government, health and education) takes up the majority of jobs in the city with 66.8% in 2017. The proportion of tertiary industry is lower than other cities in most departments because of their lower levels of industrialisation.

Socio-professional categories Aigrefeuille d'Aunis 2017

Socio-professional category	No.	Percentage
Farmers	15	0.9%
Craftsmen/Traders/Entrepreneurs	146	8.9%
Executives/professionals	206	12.6%
Associate Professionals	388	23.8%
Employees	382	23.4%
Workers	496	30.4%
Total employment	1,632	

In 2017, the category of "workers" remained dominant. This is the indication of Aigrefeuille d'Aunis being an industrial centre. The unemployment rate was 9.3% (168 persons).

=== A city with an industrial tradition ===
The city has some industrial tradition inherited from the 19th century, but the old industries disappeared after the Second World War (mills, farms peat, lime kiln, textiles, distilleries for "brandy and sugar beet"). The mills that were destroyed during the Second World War were not rebuilt, they were demolished and transformed into housing. The Sugar beet distillery ceased its activities following the Liberation and its buildings were sold in 1960. The brandy distillery became a wine merchant which sold its last bottle in 1989.

As for the dairy complex (cheese, butter and casein), it became important in the 1960s and 1970s and became one of the leading centres of dairy production in Aunis. At the same time: "in 1958, there were more than 15 larger cooperative dairy factories in the department, with more than 30,000 hl of milk treated per year". In this period of rapid development, the dairy factory at Aigrefeuille joined the powerful regional dairy union UCLA, (Note: UCLA: Union des Laiteries Coopératives de l'Aunis, with the head office at Surgères) but faced increasing competition and European restrictions on the PAC dairy quotas in France. The dairy factory was completely rebuilt and modernised in 1958 yet had to cease all activities in 1981 in favour of that at Surgères which became the main centre of all dairy production in the Central West of France.

==== The development of industrial zones ====
While the city is not home to large factories nevertheless industrial zones have been established.

There is an industrial area of 56 hectares of land and 90,000 m2 of buildings containing thirty-five establishments and twenty depots. The Handling and Transit Company (SETT) from La Rochelle occupies a warehouse of 22,500 m2 where it stocks barley and wheat".

Since the early 1970s, a new industrial area of 35 hectares has been established in the south of the town near the railway line. There are businesses specializing in: recreational boating industry, wood processing, metalworking, plastics, concrete products.

=== The recreational boating industry ===
Aigrefeuille Aunis houses the headquarters of the world leading manufacturer of cruising catamarans: Fountaine Pajot. Fountaine Pajot has been established since 1976 in the Fief-Girard industrial zone and is now the largest employer in town with about 250 staff. Since 1983 the company has delivered 1,668 catamarans of 21 different models".

=== Various industries ===
Other industrial plants of note include:

- CEM-DIP: a large industrial fabricator of wood frames using the "CTB-CI" trademark.
- SAS Gaudissard: manufacturer of aluminum gates and PVC windows employs 60 staff and has 5,000 Sq. M of factory.
- UPM-Kymmene (formerly RABOPALE): a sawmill employing 40 staff and produces 45,000 Sq. M of sawn timber per year.
- SO.GE.MA.P.: – a plastic injection moulding company which employs thirty people and manufactures garden furniture and parts public works.
- ZA Freiberg: Established in the commune in 2008 and also shared with Le Thou, it produces concrete blocks in large volumes with a land area of 65,500 Sq. M.
- Ballanger SAS: a wholesale distributor of agricultural machinery. The company is the second largest private employer in the city, employing over 78 people.

=== An agricultural service centre ===
Aigrefeuille d'Aunis has had an agricultural market to serve the Aunis plain since the Middle Ages when the town had a covered market with fairs and open markets. Today it has a weekly agricultural market and monthly fairs.

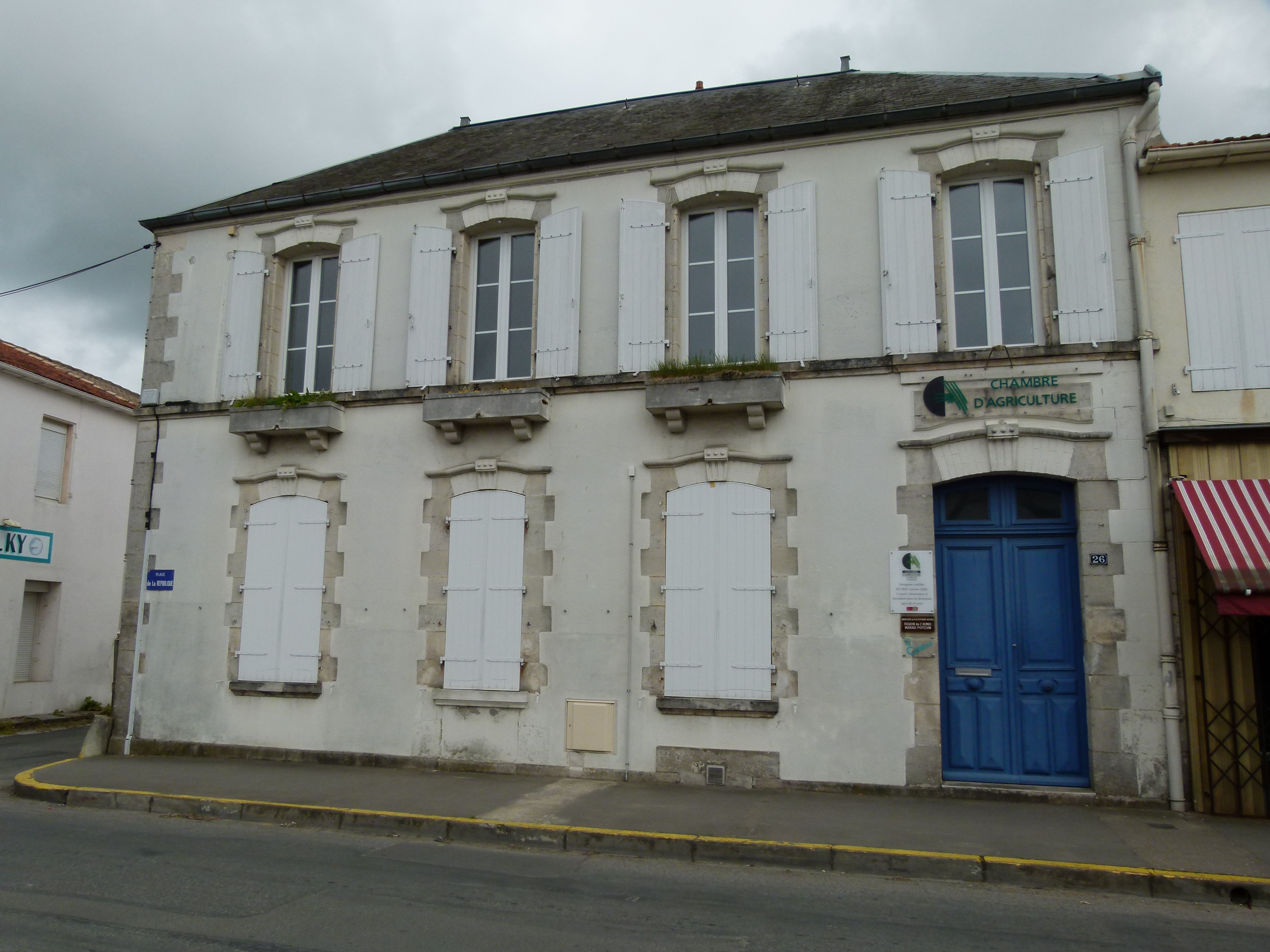
The Chamber of Agriculture has opened a branch in Aigrefeuille d'Aunis which is a major agricultural service centre in Aunis.

Aigrefeuille d'Aunis has become a major transit centre for grain with large grain silos located in the area of the old railway station. The agricultural cooperative MCA specialises in grain storage and the trading of seeds, as well as providing food for livestock. It is one of the largest employers in the city with more than fifty jobs. This grain trading company took over the premises of the former sugar beet cooperative distillery in 1960 then expanded and modernized the premises.

=== An active commercial city ===
Despite the strong influence of La Rochelle and to a lesser extent that of Rochefort and Surgères, Aigrefeuille d'Aunis has remained an active centre of trade with expansion of its shops and stores around the Place de la Republique with other shopping areas in Rue de l'Aunis and Avenue des Marronniers. On the outskirts of the city there is an Intermarche mall, Big-Mat building materials mall, and Gamm-Green gardening and DIY.

=== Activities and tourism facilities ===
There is a leisure park of eight hectares built on the shores of Lake Frace, as well as a resort named La Taillée. The latter, which covers almost four acres includes a swimming pool, a holiday village, and a campground with 82 spaces.

== Administration ==
List of Successive Mayors of Aigrefeuille-d'Aunis

Mayors from 1808 to the French Revolution to 1941

From	To	Name
1808	1812	René Pierre Musset
1812	1820	Etienne Bernard
1815	1815	Pierre André Sicatteau
1820	1825	Louis Boisdon
1825	1843	Sylvestre Jabouin
1843	1848	Jean Etienne Gouineau
1848	1852	Charles Armand Floréal Marchesseau
1852	1863	Jean Etienne Gouineau
1863	1869	Charles Armand Floréal Marchesseau
1869	1870	Pierre Jacques Bousseau
1870	1878	Jacques Dornat
1878	1880	Alfred Lambert
1880	1908	Pierre Prosper Pain
1908	1909	Clovis Bichon
1909	1912	Pierre Penaud
1912	1919	Louis Bureau
1919	1933	Charles Penaud
1933	1941	Emile Brunet

Mayors from 1941

From	To	Name	Party
1941	1944	Jean Malineau	
1944	1945	Gustave Lamoureux	
1945	1952	Joseph Avit	
1952	1973	André Dulin	
1973	1977	Madeleine Penaud	
1977	1983	John Apostle	
1983	2000	Georges Tamisier	
2000	2001	Serge Beillevert	DVD
2001	2014	Bernard Fouchard	UMP
2014	2026	Gilles Gay	DVD

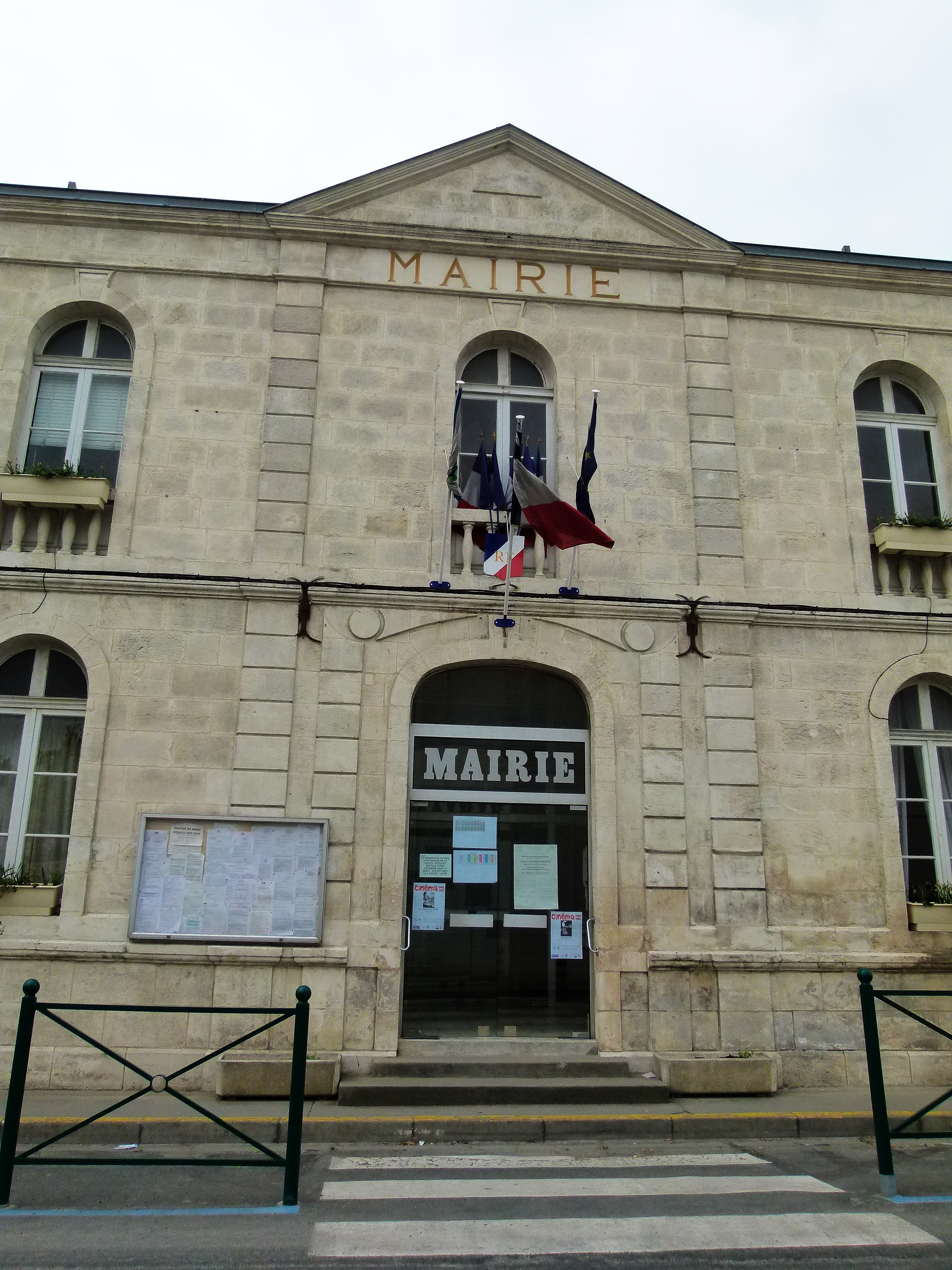
The Town Hall at Aigrefeuille-d'Aunis

=== Canton ===
Since 1801, when the consulate was established by Napoleon I, the commune of Aigrefeuille d'Aunis became the chief town of a canton which now has 11 towns and 12,866 inhabitants (in 2007). It is part of the Arrondissement of Rochefort.

=== Intercommunality ===
Aigrefeuille d'Aunis joined the Community of Communes of Plaine d'Aunis in October 2001. The commune hosts the administrative headquarters of the community which manages 17 communes.

This intercommunal structure is also part of the Pays d'Aunis whose headquarters are at Courçon. The Community of Communes of Plaine d'Aunis is the most populous part of the Pays d'Aunis.

=== Constituency ===
Since the electoral redistricting of November 1986 (under the Pasqua law), the city of Aigrefeuille d'Aunis and its canton belong to the Second Legislative District (Note: The second electoral regrouping was for the cantons of: Marans, Courçon, La Jarrie, Aytré, Aigrefeuille d'Aunis, Surgères, Rochefort-Centre, Rochefort-Nord, and Rochefort-Sud) of Charente-Maritime, also called the Rochefort Riding of Pays d'Aunis.

Since 17 June 2012, the deputy has been Suzanne Tallard, who is also mayor of Aytré and who succeeded Jean-Louis Leonard.

=== Taxation ===
The taxation of households and businesses in Aigrefeuille d'Aunis 2009
Tax	Communal Tax	Intercommunal Tax	Departmental Tax	Regional Tax
Housing Tax (TH)	19,96%	1,15%	6,75%	0,00%
Building Tax (TFPB)	21,73%	2,09%	13,28%	3,32%
Land Tax (TFPNB)	65,53%	6,27%	27,65%	8,63%
Business Tax (TP)	0,00%	13,84%	8,85%	2,51%

The regional share of the property tax is not applicable.

Aigrefeuille d'Aunis commune does not collect business tax: it is collected by the Community of Communes of Plaine d'Aunis. The business tax was replaced in 2010 by the company land premium (CFE) on the rental value of property and the contribution of the added value of enterprises tax (CAVE) (both forming the territorial economic contribution (CET) which is a local tax introduced by the Finance Act 2010).

=== Police Station ===
The city has a police station located on Avenue des Marronniers, in a new, more functional building abandoning the old building built in 1875. Its radius of action covers the entire Canton of Aigrefeuille d'Aunis.

The Aigrefeuille d'Aunis police unit works together with that of Surgères where two units of the police force coordinate their efforts within the Community brigades of Surgères and Aigrefeuille, known under the acronym "COB Surgères / aigrefeuille". This unit operates in two cantons together with over 28,000 inhabitants and covers 23 communes. COB Surgères / Aigrefeuille is empowered to conduct anti-crime operations (ADO) with stop and search for people and vehicles, occasionally assisted by additional anti-narcotic units (air support helicopter, dog and patrols from the Psig of Rochefort).

The city opened a new police barracks on 20 May 2011 where it has renovated offices and new housing to accommodate 11 policemen and their families.

=== Twinning ===
Aigrefeuille-d'Aunis has twinning associations with:

- Velden (Germany) since 1985.

Since 1985, the town of Aigrefeuille d'Aunis has been twinned with Velden, a town of the district of Landshut in Bavaria, Germany, located 60 km north-east of Munich.

This pairing originated from the captivity of an inhabitant of the town during the Second World War, Paul Métais.

== Population and urbanization ==
=== Population ===
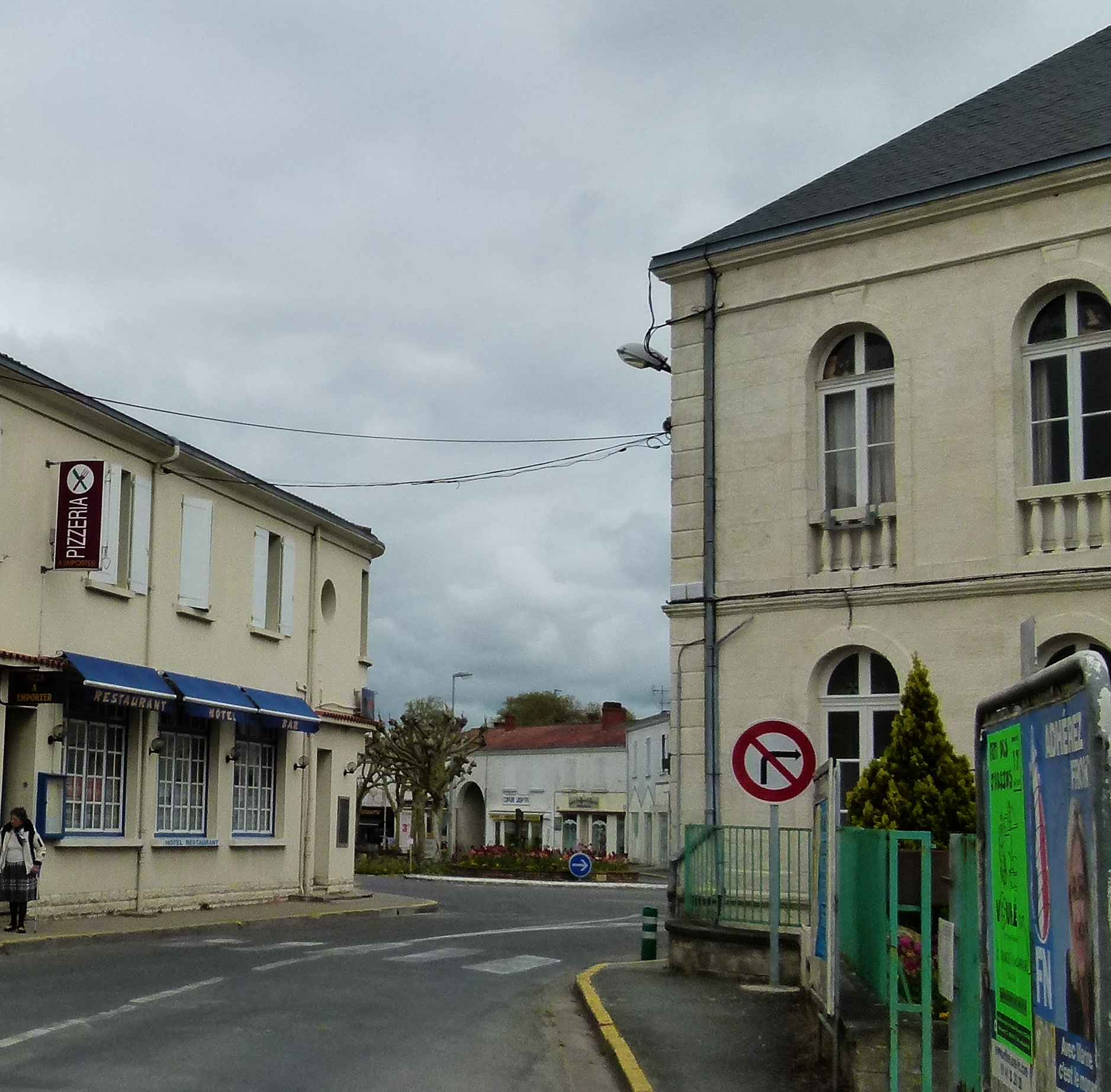
One of the streets in central Aigrefeuille d'Aunis with the city hall on the right and the central square in the background.

Aigrefeuille-d'Aunis is an urban commune which is part of the functional urban area of La Rochelle. It is a small city that has seen a dramatic increase in population since the end of the Second World War when its population more than doubled between 1946 and 2007. The inhabitants are known as Aigrefeuillais or Aigrefeuillaises in French.

In 1946 the population at 1278 was at its lowest ever recorded level. In 1975 the population exceeded 2,000 for the first time ever. At the next census in 1982, it reached 2,843 which is when INSEE officially classified it as an urban commune. Since then, it has increased beyond 4,000 inhabitants in 2017 and growth continues.

Historical population
Year	Pop.	±% p.a.
1968	1,940	—
1975	2,313	+2.54%
1982	2,843	+2.99%
1990	2,944	+0.44%
1999	3,151	+0.76%
2007	3,577	+1.60%
2012	3,724	+0.81%
2017	4,037	+1.63%
2023	4,677	+2.48%
Source: INSEE

=== The urban development of the commune ===
In 2007, Aigrefeuille d'Aunis was the 19th largest urban unit of the Charente-Maritime. This small town has undergone profound changes in the urban landscape since the end of World War II and continues to evolve even though it still retains a certain cachet of a large rural village.

At the end of the Second World War, Aigrefeuille d'Aunis was still a small rural town and the town was in a rebuilding phase, having been heavily bombed during military assaults in the La Rochelle pocket to clear the region of the occupiers. Its population then dropped to its lowest level ever recorded in the town (1,278) in 1946. The village centre lost a large number of traces of the past, only a few old houses – like the old confessional boarding school, the former police station, and the Town Hotel – have been saved and the church dominates the city with its high tower.

The strong rural and village character inherited from the prewar Aigrefeuille d'Aunis has been gradually reduced and the commune displays a more marked urban character, including the development of residential areas and renovation of the urban habitat.

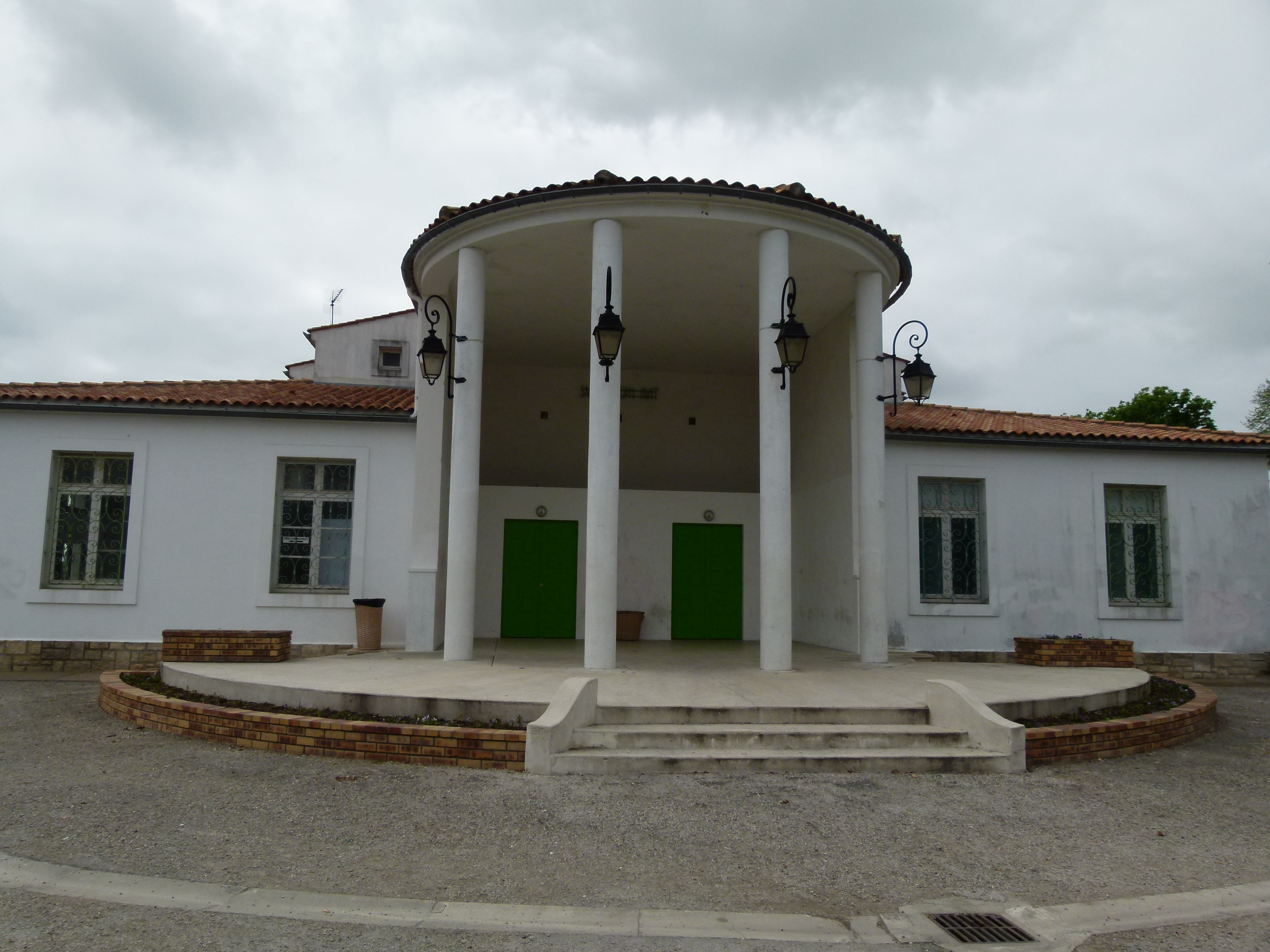
The municipal hall of Aigrefeuille d'Aunis was built in 1952.

It is from the 1970s and especially during the decade of the 1980s, that the commune has initiated a voluntary program of urbanization by acquiring many subdivisions of houses grouped under the generic term of fief or suburb. It is in this period that the city has grown the most and suffered the most changes, gaining more than a thousand people between 1968 and 1982. These new developments now surround the centre of the city and extend along the main access routes to the city centre. The construction of suburbs and cooperative subdivisions, begun in the sixties and seventies, helped to seal the fate of the old villages and the town, including the former villages of La Fragnée, to the west, and L'Angle to the east.

Then, in the course of the 1970s and 1980s, the old village of Péré was integrated into the city by the establishment of new residential areas, while industrial areas spread south of the city, along the lines of road and rail communication, especially around the area of the station. The old village of Grand Chemin has grown as a residential area and connects the urban residential area of Aigrefeuille and the industrial area of Fief-Girard. To the north-east towards the new tourist attraction of the city near Lake Frace and to the village of Virson extends a residential area of more dense housing (Fief des Dames, Hameau du Lac). It is to the east of the city that urbanization is accentuated with the old wooded village of La Taillée, transformed early on into a site of recreation and tourism. This part of the city is growing towards the large village of La Planterie that in the early 1960s, was a modest hamlet barely reported on maps. Some modern building of private residences has taken place in the residential park to the west and north of the city centre to complete this controlled urbanization.

== Culture and heritage ==
=== Civil heritage ===
The commune has three buildings and structures that are registered as historical monuments:

- The Betteraves Distillery (1888)
- The Dairy Factory (1890)
- The Seigneurie de Chaumeau Farm and Mill (18th century)

Other sites of interest

- The Town Hall was built in cut stone with bands between the floors and a triangular Pediment. It is one of the oldest buildings in the city, dating from the period of the end of the Second Empire. It was inaugurated in 1870.
- The old Maréchaussée, now Gendarmerie (Police Station) was built during the Third Republic in 1876 and is of the same neo-classical style as the Town Hall and also built with cut stone. This elegant building now houses the social services of the Town Hall.
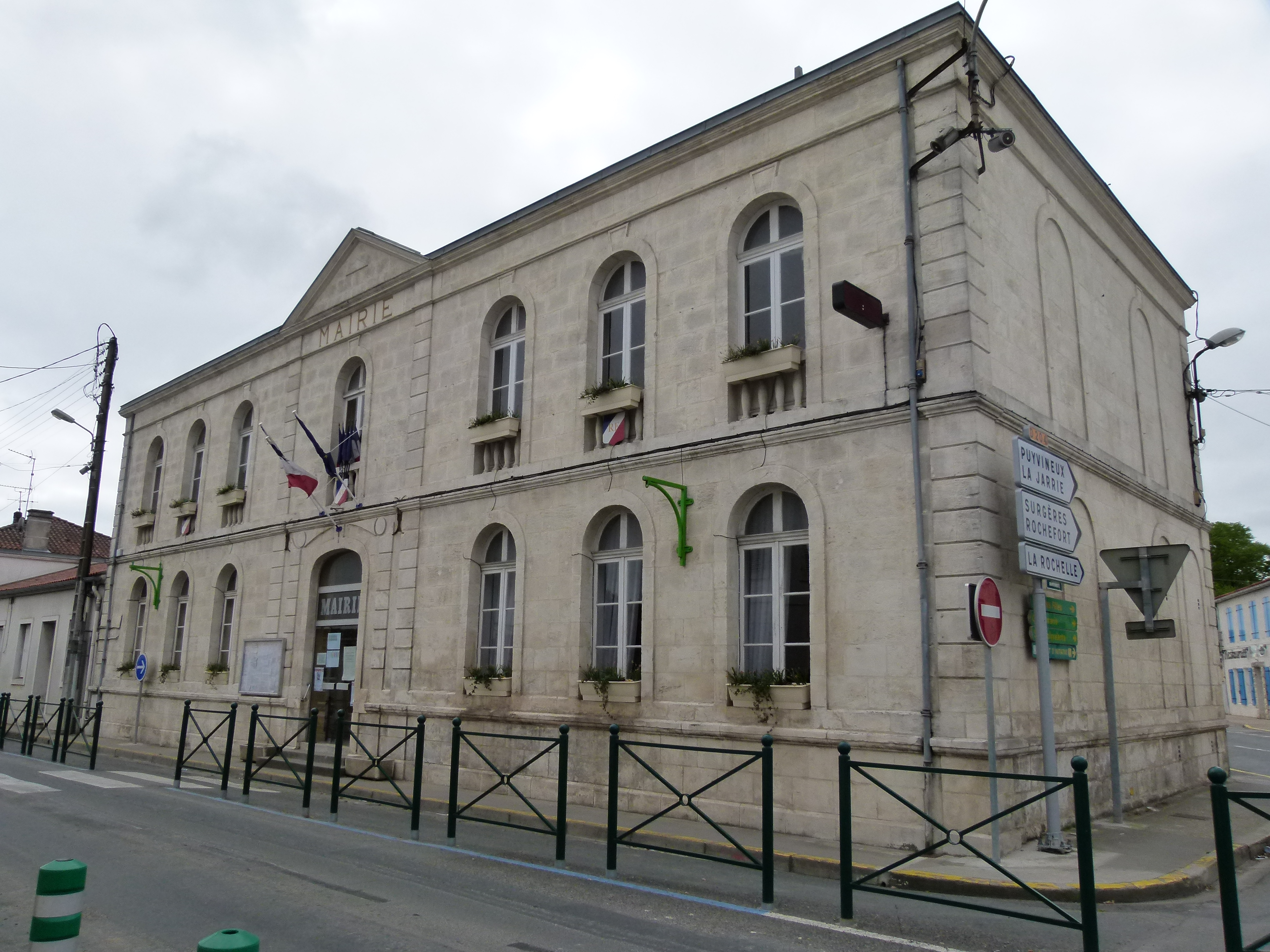
The Town Hall of Aigrefeuille d'Aunis view from the Place de la République.

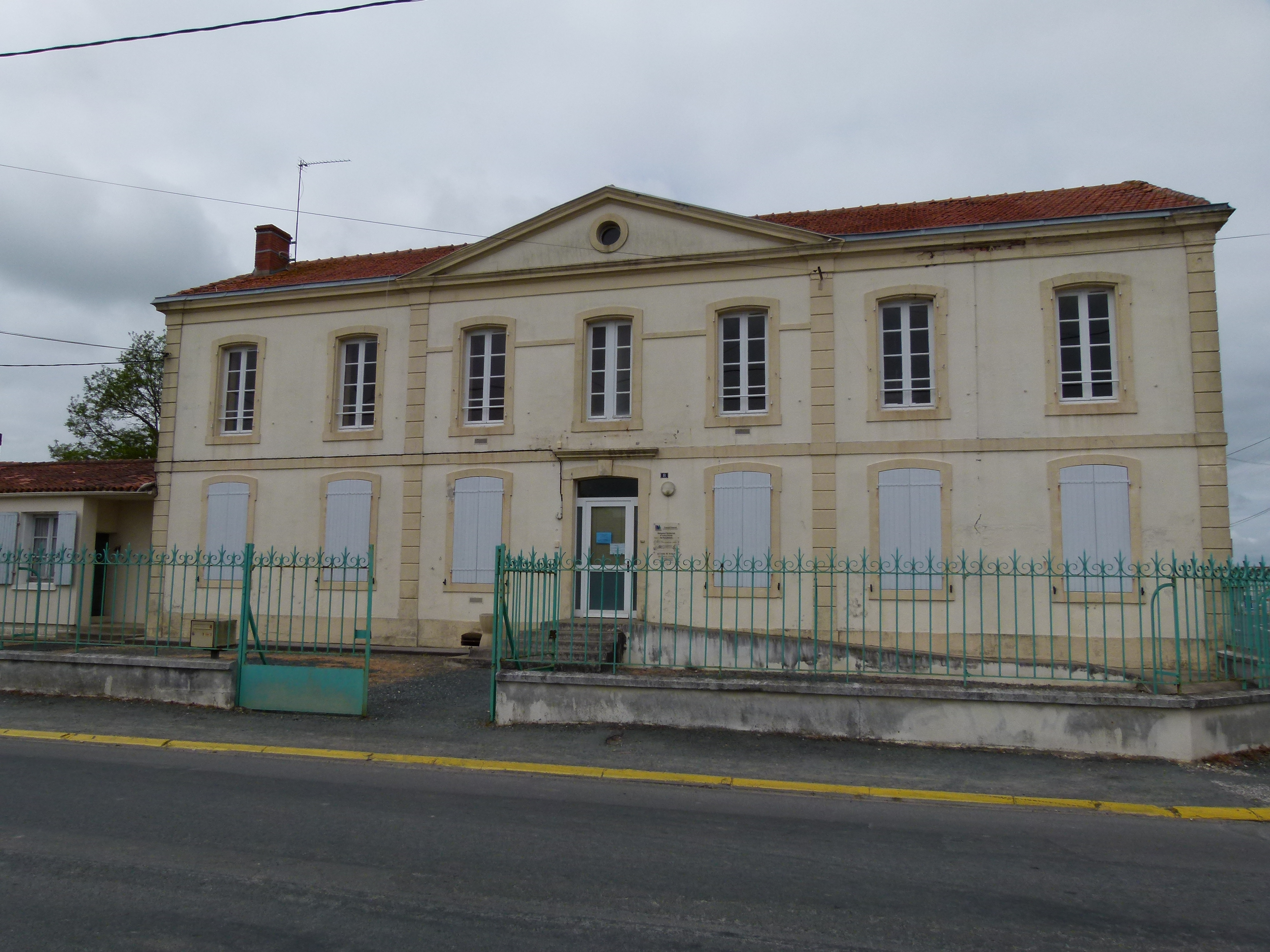
Former Police Station of Aigrefeuille d'Aunis.

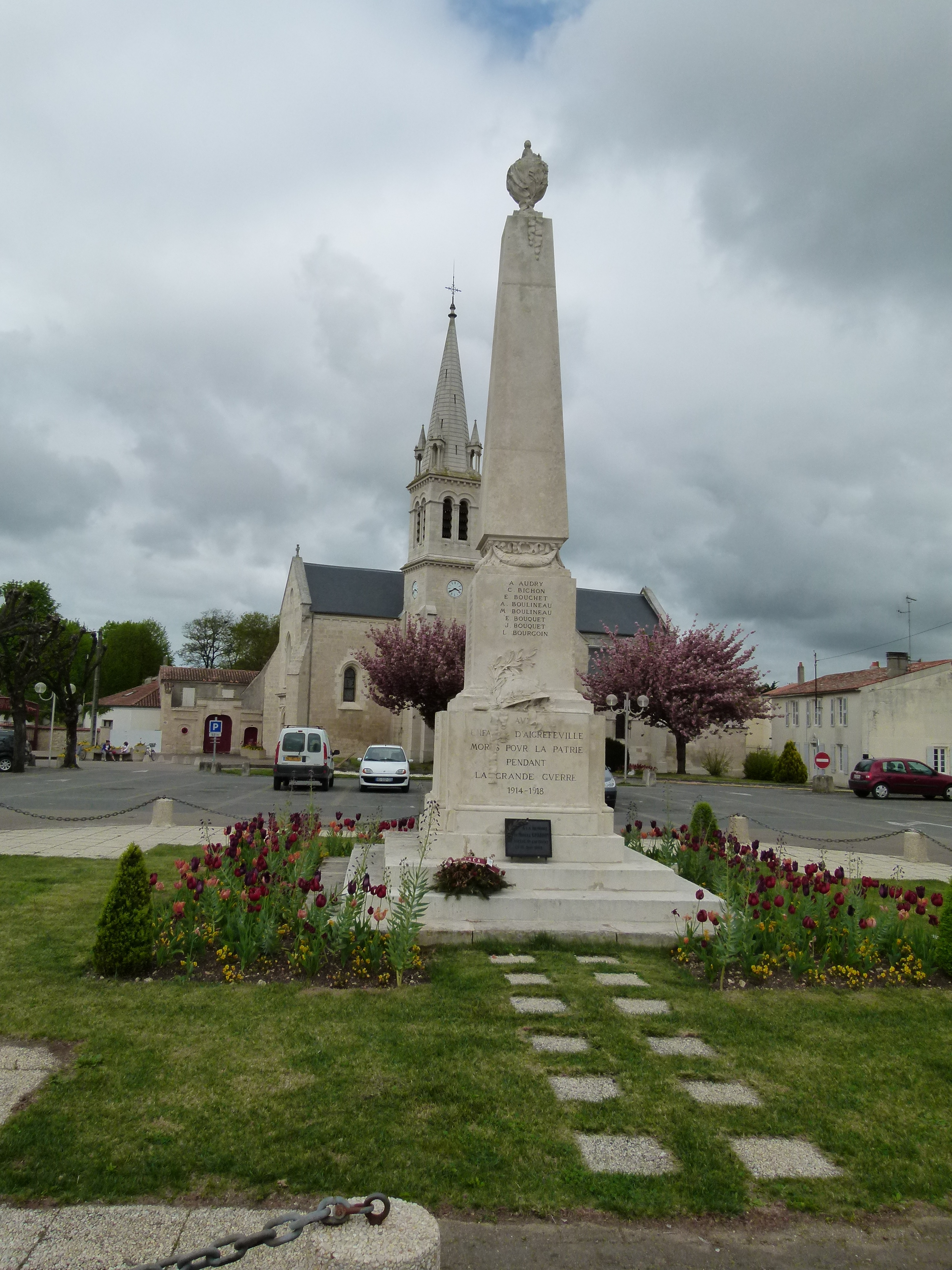
The war memorial on the Place de la République.

=== Religious heritage ===
==== The church of Saint-Étienne ====
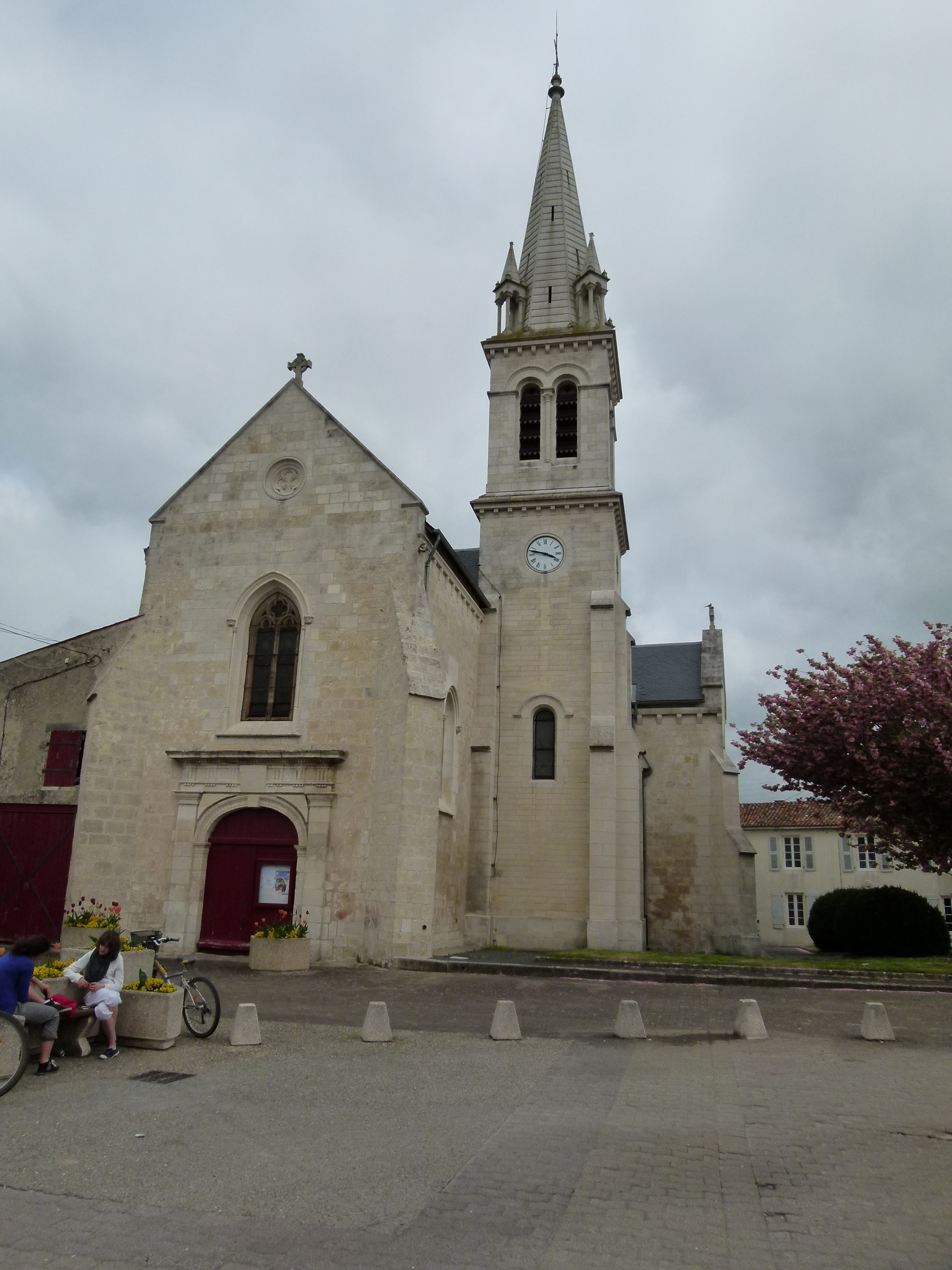
The church of Saint-Étienne Aigrefeuille d'Aunis was much altered in the 19th century.

The Church of Saint-Étienne, originally built in the middle of the 12th century, has undergone many changes during its history. Dependent at the beginning on the chapter of Soubise, the old church was a modest Romanesque structure. Several campaigns at the beginning of the 14th century led to the expansion of the sanctuary, which was enclosed by ribbed vaults with a flat chevet, and the construction of rectangular side chapels replaced the old Romanesque absidioles

The current facade, flanked by two massive buttresses, was greatly modified in the 18th century. A new campaign of work conducted in the following century led to the replacement of the old medieval tower, formerly established at the intersection of the transept: a neo-Romanesque bell tower surmounted by an octagonal spire in stone containing four pierced pinnacles. This configuration differed from a number of churches in Aunis, which often featured campenards.

Notable features include the Romanesque croisillons, the only evidence of the original building, which retain their vaults with broken supports from the 12th century and several storied capitals. The ribbed vaults of the nave rest on carved bases. A wooden tabernacle dating from the first half of the 18th century is kept in the sacristy.

In the immediate vicinity of the church, the Place de la République (formerly known as Place de l'Église then Place du Maréchal Pétain during the occupation) has seen many changes and embellishments. It remains the heart of the city and offers an interesting perspective on the sanctuary. The war memorial there was created by the architect Beraud in 1920.

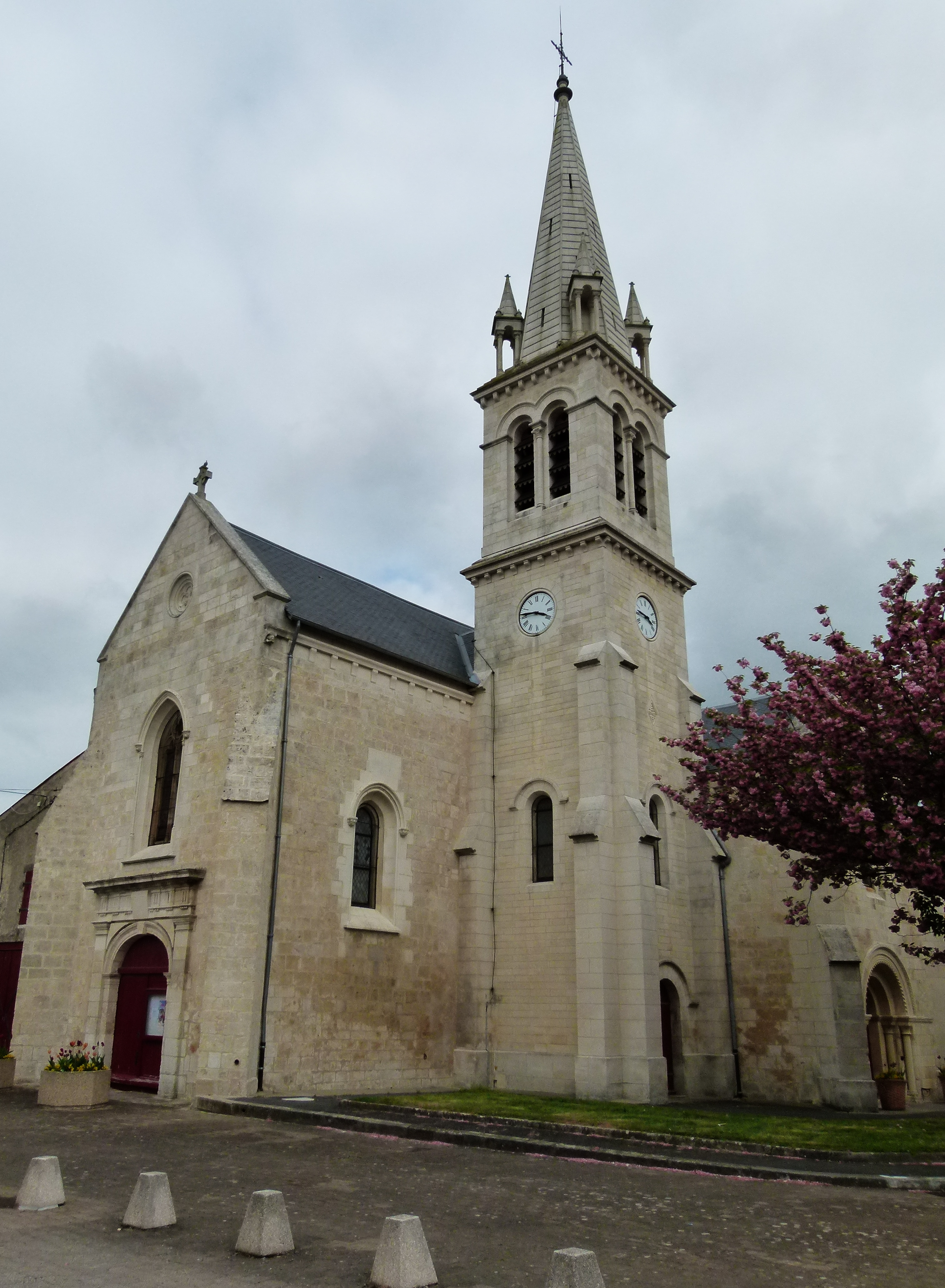
The steeple of the church of Saint-Étienne.

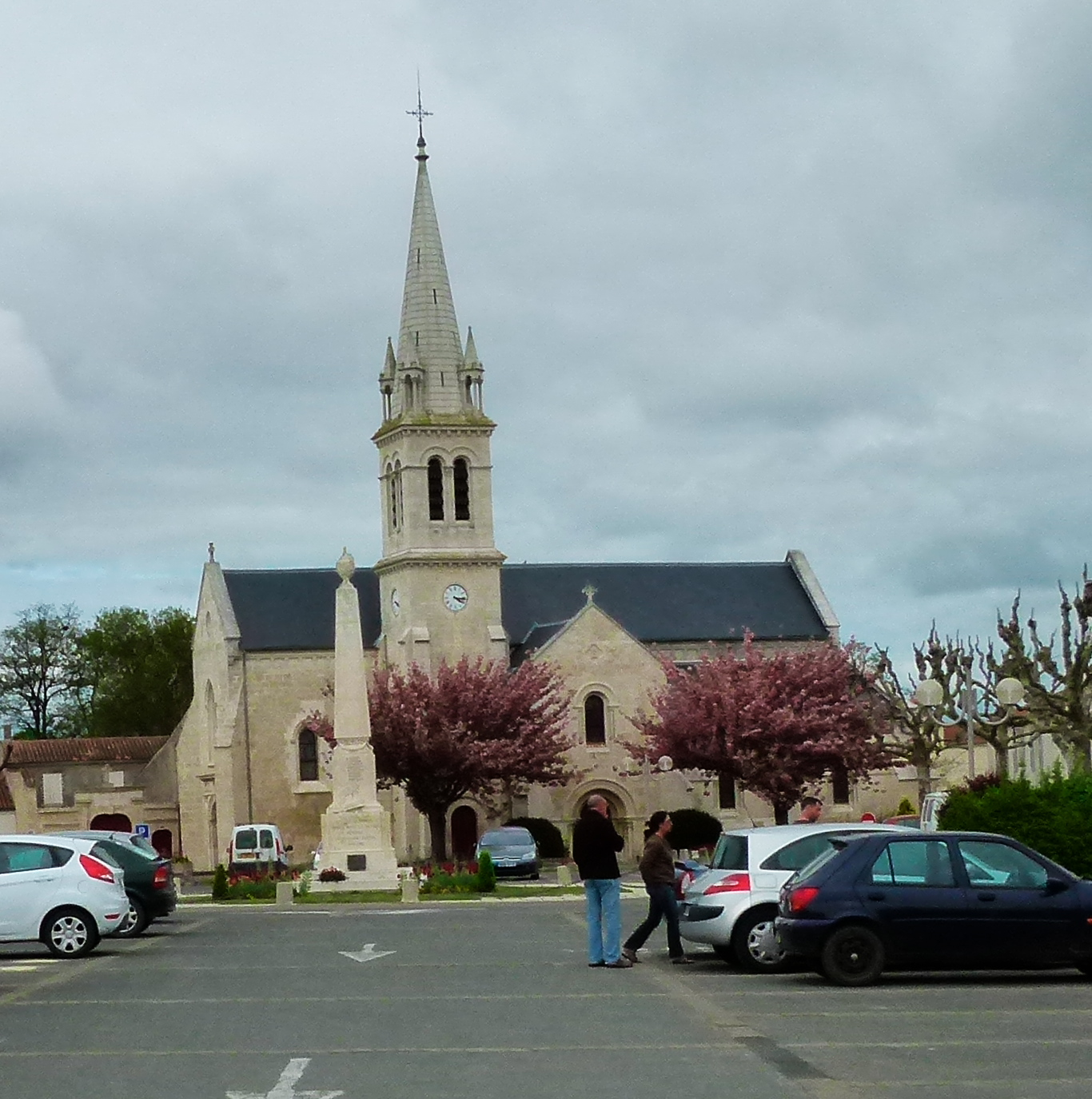
The church and the war memorial.

==== The College of the Holy Sacrament ====
This religious institution was founded in 1857 at the request of the Bishop of La Rochelle: Jean-François Landriot. Four Sisters of the Blessed Sacrament of Autun are responsible for the management of the institution, which had nearly a hundred students at the beginning of the 20th century. The college was converted into a hospital during the First World War.

The buildings are built in cut stone and are characterized by a certain academicism. A new neo-Gothic chapel replaced the first oratory in 1885.

== Facilities ==
=== Inter-urban transport ===
==== Road access ====
The Inter-urban bus transport departmental network called Les Mouettes regularly operate between Aigrefeuille d'Aunis and La Rochelle, Rochefort, and Surgères.

The city is served daily by the main Service 11 La Rochelle-Surgères and regular secondary services Nos. 195 and 196, the first connecting with Rochefort and serving the cantons south of Aigrefeuille township and the second connecting to La Rochelle via La Jarrie.

==== Rail service ====
The Aigrefeuille station was closed to passenger traffic in 1993 after being served by the TGV. (Note: The Aigrefeuille Station can be temporarily occupied by a security guard if needed (during any works, for example, or in case of a serious disturbance). See also the website "Sur les Rails Charentais" (in French)) Yet it was one of the earliest railway stations have been built in the Charente-Maritime. In fact, the railway came to Aigrefeuille in 1857 thanks to the Paris Orléans Company (PO).

The nearest railway station to Aigrefeuille is Surgères, located 15 kilometres from the town centre. Surgères Railway Station is the third railway station of the Charente-Maritime by passenger traffic and is served by TGV on the Paris-La Rochelle line via Poitiers.

==== Air service ====
The nearest airport is the La Rochelle-Ile de Ré airport. It is located 30 kilometres west of the commune. It is the largest airport in the Nouvelle-Aquitaine region by passenger traffic (more than 220,000 passengers per year) and the largest in the Loire Valley and Gironde.

=== Medical services ===
The town has two surgeries, one of which is located in the city centre. This medical centre houses four GPs while in the outskirts of the city centre is a second surgery.

The centre also has two dental practices.

Aigrefeuille d'Aunis does not have a radiology or MRI centre. The nearest is at Surgères. The nearest hospital is located in Rochefort less than twenty kilometres south of Aigrefeuille d'Aunis, however the Central Hospital of La Rochelle which is more than twenty kilometres to the west offers a very wide range of treatments as it is the largest hospital in the department of Charente-Maritime.

=== Paramedical services ===
The city has a nursing home with four therapists, two speech therapists, and a podiatrist. On the outskirts of the city centre, are several nursing and physiotherapy practices.

Aigefeuille d'Aunis has two pharmacies, both located in the city centre, and an optician. There is also a dental prosthesis laboratory.

The city does not have a medical laboratory, the nearest being located at Surgères.

An ambulance service is located on the outskirts of the town centre. It is supported by firefighters occasionally needed to intervene in an emergency situation. There is also a rescue centre, which depends on the SDIS of Charente-Maritime.

A veterinary clinic is located in the city which covers the whole canton of Aigrefeuille d'Aunis while the artificial insemination centre covers the entire north of the Charente-Maritime.

=== Old Age Social Services ===
A retirement residence, under the department of Charente-Maritime, can accommodate up to sixty residents. Set in a landscaped garden and located 300 metres from the city centre, this public retirement village also has a specialized Alzheimer's unit of 10 hospital beds.

A home help service within a larger departmental structure, has opened a branch in the city.

=== Education ===
More than 1,050 students attend schools and colleges located in Aigrefeuille d'Aunis.

==== Schools ====
Aigrefeuille d'Aunis has both private and public education schools.

The kindergarten and primary school of the public sector are in a school complex located in the Rue des Écoles near the city centre. This group of schools was built in 1958 and was successively expanded in 1962 and in 1977.

In the private sector, Aigrefeuille d'Aunis has the Seminary of the Holy Sacrament, which is located in Virson Street near the city centre. It consists of a kindergarten and an elementary school.

==== Colleges ====
The college of modern construction, was built on the road to Saint-Christophe. It is called CES André Dulin, named after the former President of the General Council of Charente-Maritime and Mayor of Aigrefeuille d'Aunis. This school has undergone several phases of expansion due to the steady increase in numbers. After its construction in 1955 it was expanded in 1964 and again in 1972. This is one of the largest colleges in the Charente-Maritime by enrollment with 715 students which are supervised by a faculty of fifty teachers.

The college catchment area covers the eleven communes in the canton of Aigrefeuille d'Aunis and falls within the district of Rochefort for the academic Inspection Department.

The College of the Holy Sacrament is a private college with recruitment going beyond the limits of the canton of Aigefeuille d'Aunis. It was a boarding school until the 1990s which then was replaced by a network of host families. The old chapel was renovated in 1991 and offers a beautiful room for conferences and the college choir.

This private school is one of ten private schools in the department of Charente-Maritime. It works with a network of private schools in Surgères and Marans.

=== Sports ===
The commune has a football stadium, a rugby stadium, an athletics track, an intercommunal swimming pool, a new intercommunal dojo, several tennis courts and a gym.

Since 2010, a new sports complex on the road to Saint-Christophe northwest of the city centre has been opened. It covers 45,000 sq. m including a reception area, a training ground, a games area, a playground for children, stands, and changing rooms.

=== Culture ===
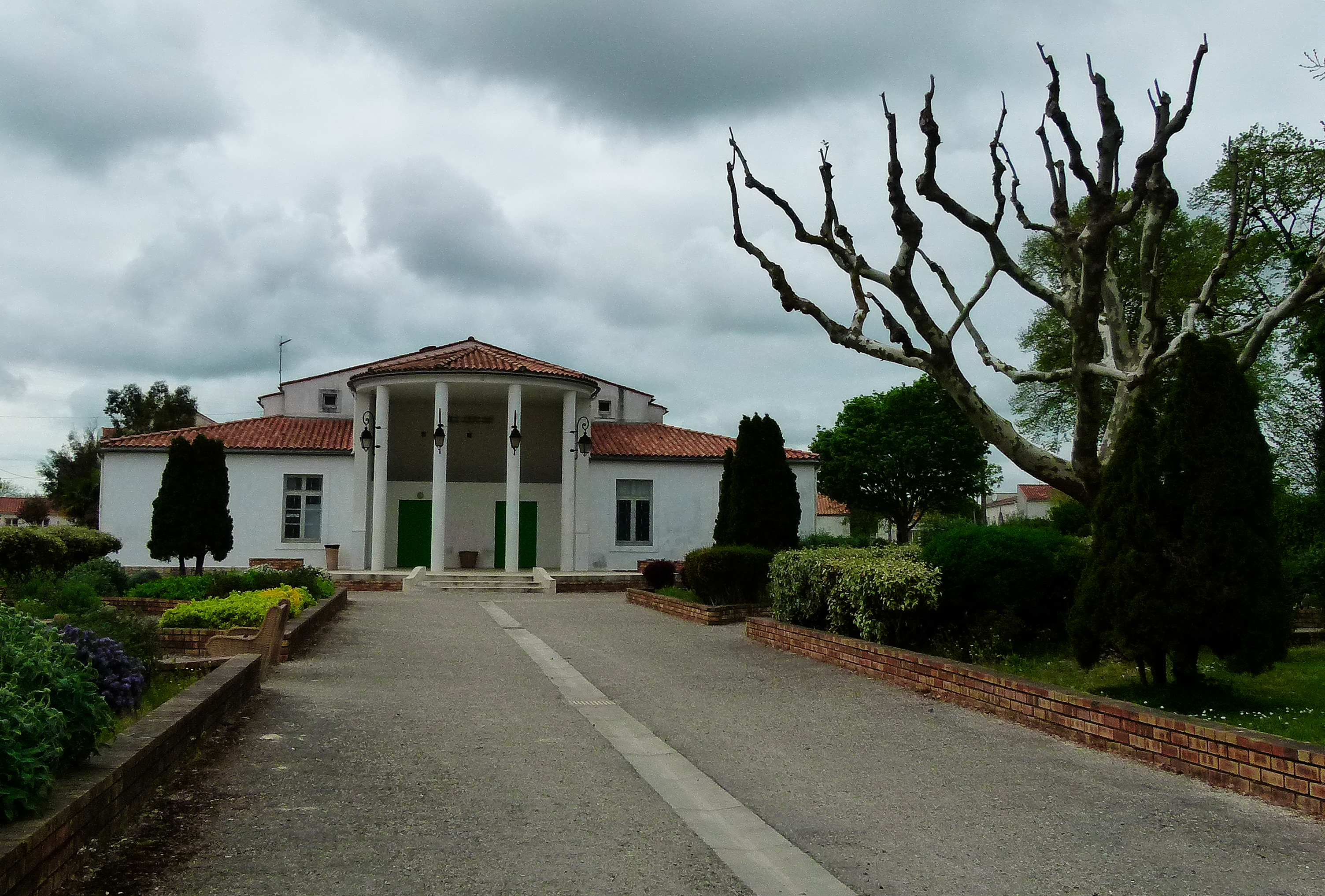
The village hall and forest park of Aigrefeuille d'Aunis.

Cultural facilities are:

- a village hall
- a multipurpose hall
- a Municipal Library
- a School of Music and Dance.

=== Local life ===
==== Religion ====
Aigrefeuille d'Aunis belongs to the Roman Catholic Diocese of La Rochelle and Saintes and the Metropolitan Archdiocese of Poitiers (Prior to 2002 in the Archdiocese of Bordeaux).

The Aigrefeuille d'Aunis catholic church provides religious services.

The commune does not have a Protestant church, however worship can be celebrated in La Rochelle or Rochefort.

==== Media ====
The city of Aigrefeuille d'Aunis is served by the regional daily newspaper Sud Ouest, which has a branch in La Rochelle, and the weekly magazine Charente-Maritime-Hebdo, headquartered in Surgères.

==== TV ====
The town is served by the transmitter of La Rochelle-ZUP de Mireuil (analogue and digital TV). Digital broadcasting from this transmitter was activated in October 2006 in order to overcome the deficiencies of the transmitter at Niort-Maisonneuve (signal distortion was reported in some areas of the Charente-Maritime). All national channels are broadcast, including the regional version of France 3, France 3 Poitou-Charentes, and its local station: France 3 Atlantique.

== See also ==
- Communes of the Charente-Maritime department

=== Bibliography ===
- Yves Blomme, The Churches of Aunis, Éditions Bordessoules, Saint-Jean-d'Angély, 1993. (in French)
- J.C. Bonnin, Aigrefeuille in Aunis and its lords, La Rochelle, 1991. (in French)
- Jean-Luc Flohic, The Heritage of the communes of Charente-Maritime, (collective work), collection Le patrimoine des communes, Flohic éditions, 2002,(Monograph on Aigrefeuille d'Aunis), Vol 1, pp. 41–44). (in French)
- Améric-Jean-Marie Gautier, Dictionary of communes in Lower Charente, Les Chemins de la Mémoire, Saintes, p. 59/60. (in French)
