= Ballon, Charente-Maritime =

Ballon
- Commune
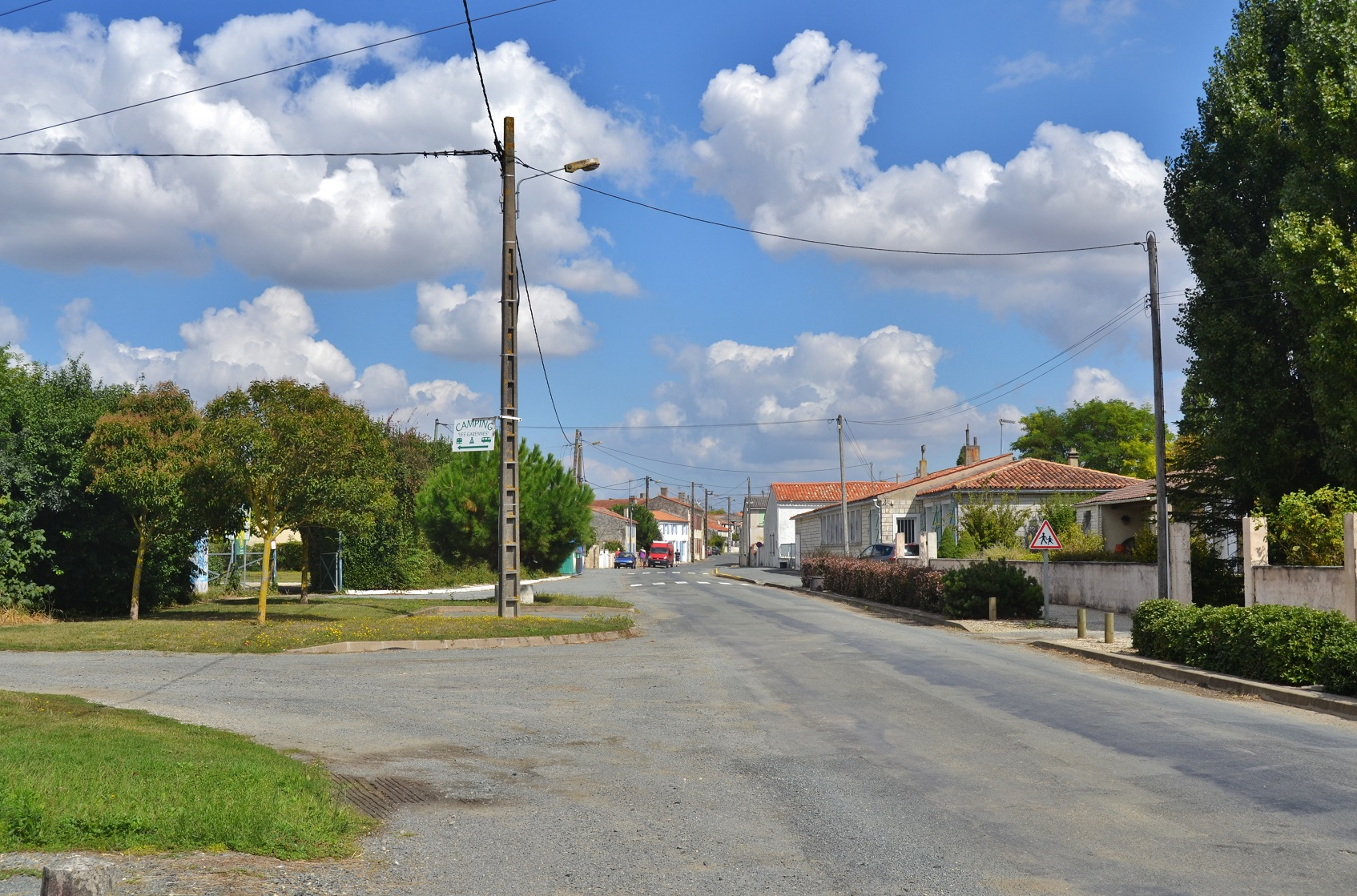
- The village of Ballon
- Location of Ballon
- Location within France Location within Nouvelle-Aquitaine
- Coordinates: 46°03′28″N 0°57′04″W
- Country: France
- Region: Nouvelle-Aquitaine
- Department: Charente-Maritime
- Arrondissement: Rochefort
- Canton: Surgères

Government
  - Mayor (2020–2026): Emmanuel Jobin
- Area^{1}: 12.18 km^{2} (4.70 sq mi)
- Elevation: 12 m (39 ft)
- Highest elevation: 47 m (154 ft)
- Lowest elevation: 0 m (0 ft)
- Population (2023): 828
  - Density: 68.0/km^{2} (176/sq mi)
- Time zone: UTC+01:00 (CET)
  - Summer (DST): UTC+02:00 (CEST)
- INSEE/Postal code: 17032 /17290
- ^{1} French Land Register data, which excludes lakes, ponds, glaciers > 1 km^{2} (0.386 sq mi or 247 acres) and river estuaries.

Ballon (French pronunciation: [balɔ̃]) is a commune in the Charente-Maritime department, region of Nouvelle-Aquitaine, southwestern France.

== Geography ==
Ballon is located some 12 km north of Rochefort and 6 km south of Aigrefeuille-d'Aunis. Access to the commune is by the D111 road from Thairé in the west which passes through the village and continues to Ciré-d'Aunis in the east. The D266 goes south-west from the village then west to join the D110 west of the commune. The commune is entirely farmland.

The Canal de Charras forms the south-eastern border of the commune with the Canal des Roseaux joining it on the southern border and forming part of the south western border. In most of the commune – especially the south – there is an extensive network of canals including the Canal de Ceinture du Marais de Moullepieds and the Canal de Lileau.

== Administration ==
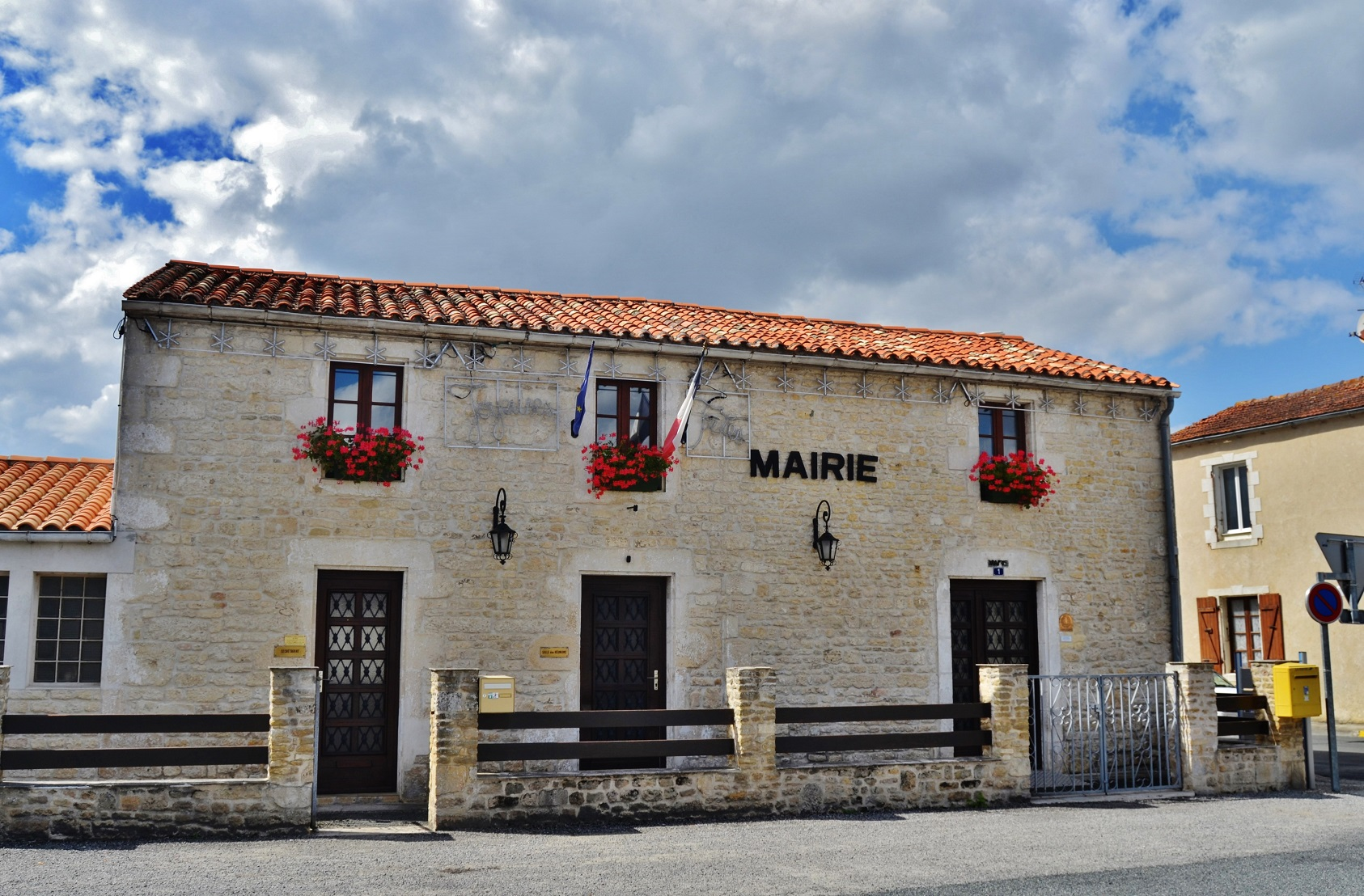
The Town Hall

List of Successive Mayors

From	To	Name
2001	2014	Noël Gaynet
2014	2020	Emmanuel Devaud
2020	2026	Emmanuel Jobin

== Demography ==
The inhabitants of the commune are known as Ballonais or Ballonaises in French.

Historical population

Year	Pop.	±% p.a.
1793	638	—
1821	700	+0.33%
1846	627	−0.44%
1872	596	−0.19%
1901	481	−0.74%
1926	417	−0.57%
1946	322	−1.28%
1962	366	+0.80%
1968	345	−0.98%

Year	Pop.	±% p.a.
1975	378	+1.31%
1982	432	+1.93%
1990	482	+1.38%
1999	526	+0.98%
2007	647	+2.62%
2012	768	+3.49%
2017	795	+0.69%
2023	828	+0.68%

Source: EHESS and INSEE

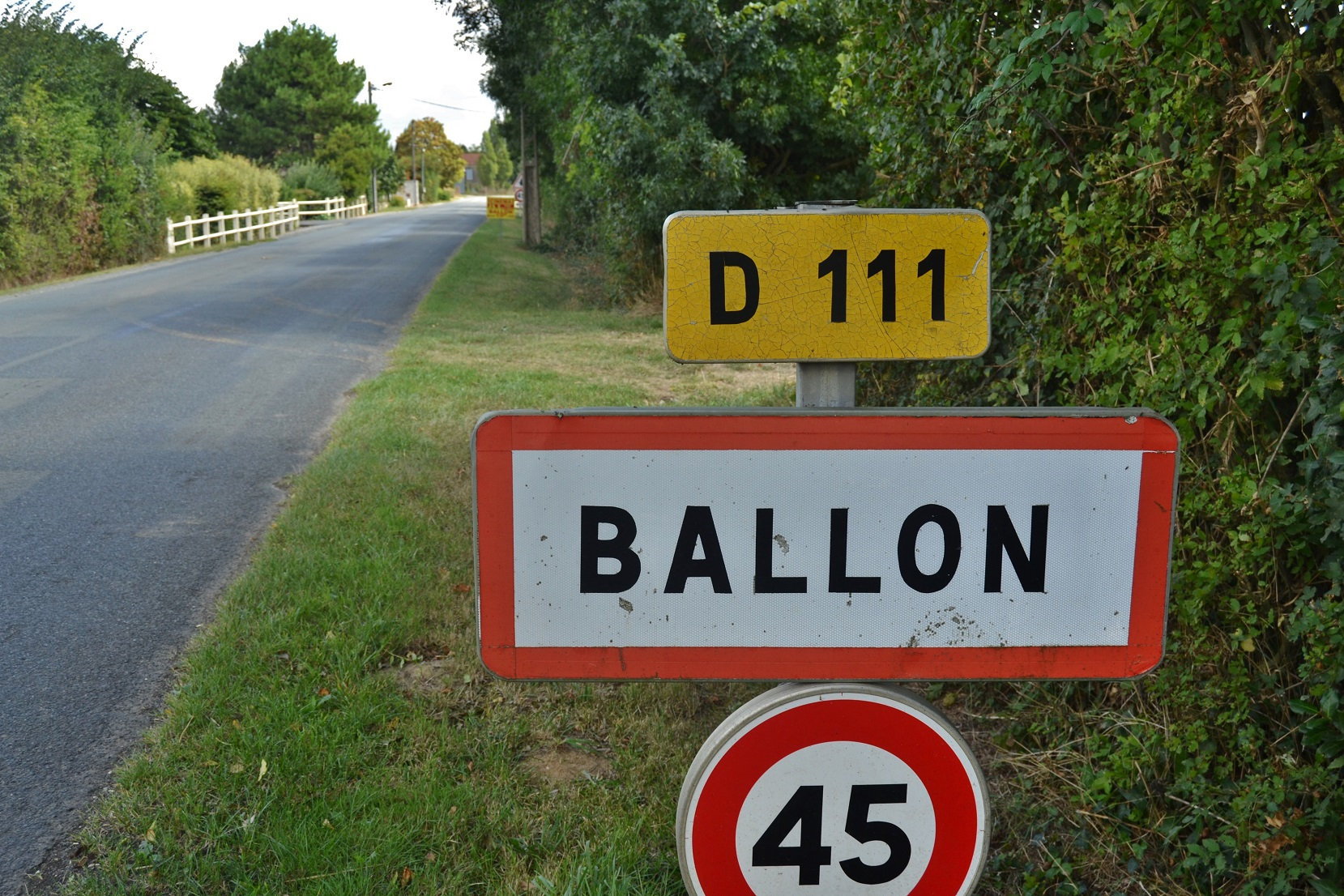
Entry to Ballon

== See also ==
- Communes of the Charente-Maritime department
