= Landrais =

- Commune
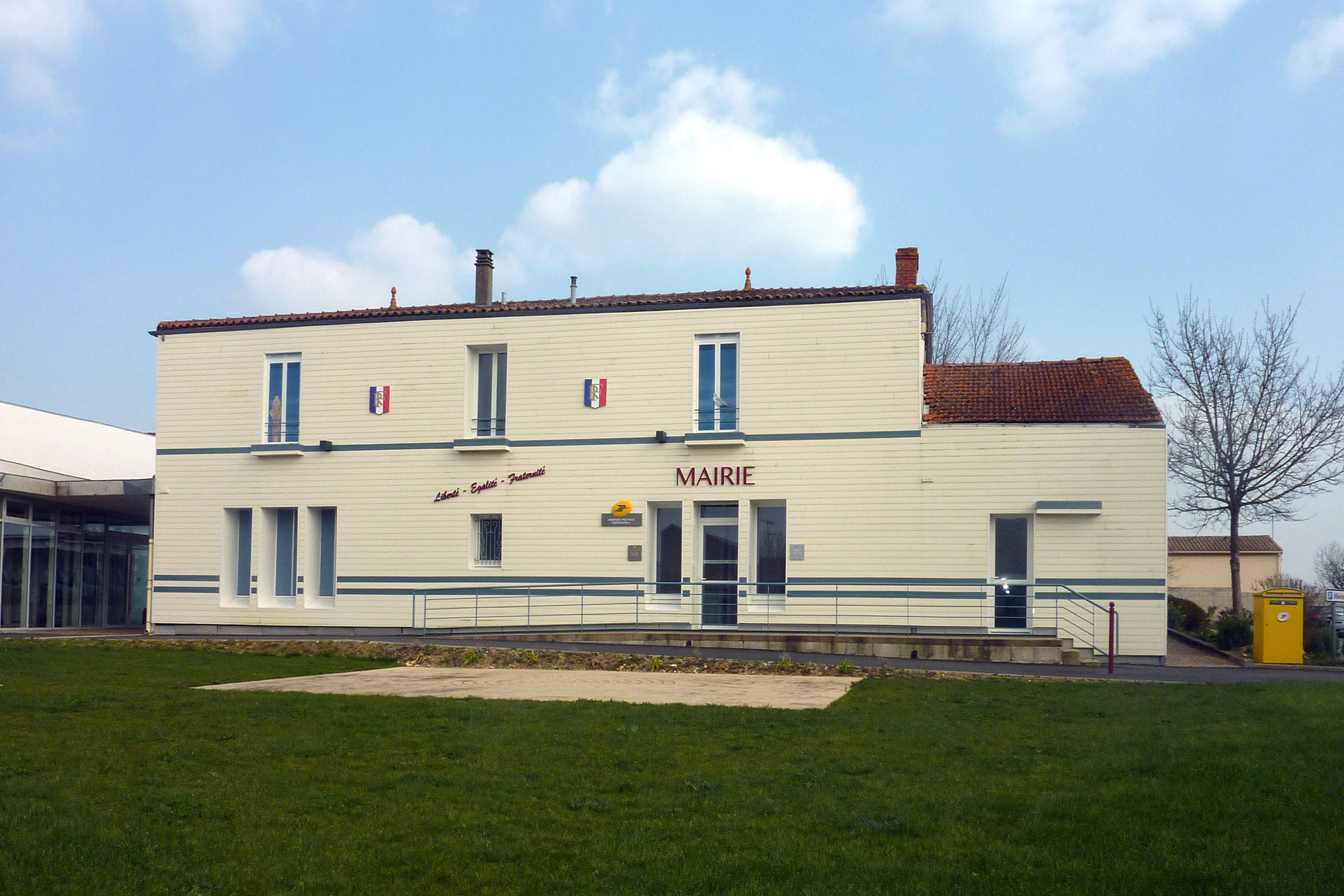
- The town hall in Landrais
- Location of Landrais
- Location within France Location within Nouvelle-Aquitaine
- Coordinates: 46°04′14″N 0°51′39″W
- Country: France
- Region: Nouvelle-Aquitaine
- Department: Charente-Maritime
- Arrondissement: Rochefort
- Canton: Surgères

Government
  - Mayor (2020–2026): Christelle Grasso
- Area^{1}: 15.4 km^{2} (5.9 sq mi)
- Elevation: 5 m (16 ft)
- Highest elevation: 33 m (108 ft)
- Lowest elevation: 1 m (3.3 ft)
- Population (2023): 797
  - Density: 51.8/km^{2} (134/sq mi)
- Time zone: UTC+01:00 (CET)
  - Summer (DST): UTC+02:00 (CEST)
- INSEE/Postal code: 17203 /17290
- Website: landrais.e-monsite.com
- ^{1} French Land Register data, which excludes lakes, ponds, glaciers > 1 km^{2} (0.386 sq mi or 247 acres) and river estuaries.

Landrais (French pronunciation: [lɑ̃dʁɛ]) is a commune in the Charente-Maritime department in the Nouvelle-Aquitaine region in southwestern France.

== Population ==
Historical population
Year	Pop.	±% p.a.
1968	480	—
1975	477	−0.09%
1982	459	−0.55%
1990	474	+0.40%
1999	526	+1.16%
2007	629	+2.26%
2012	746	+3.47%
2017	736	−0.27%
2023	797	+1.34%
Source: INSEE

== See also ==
- Communes of the Charente-Maritime department
