= Virson =

- Commune
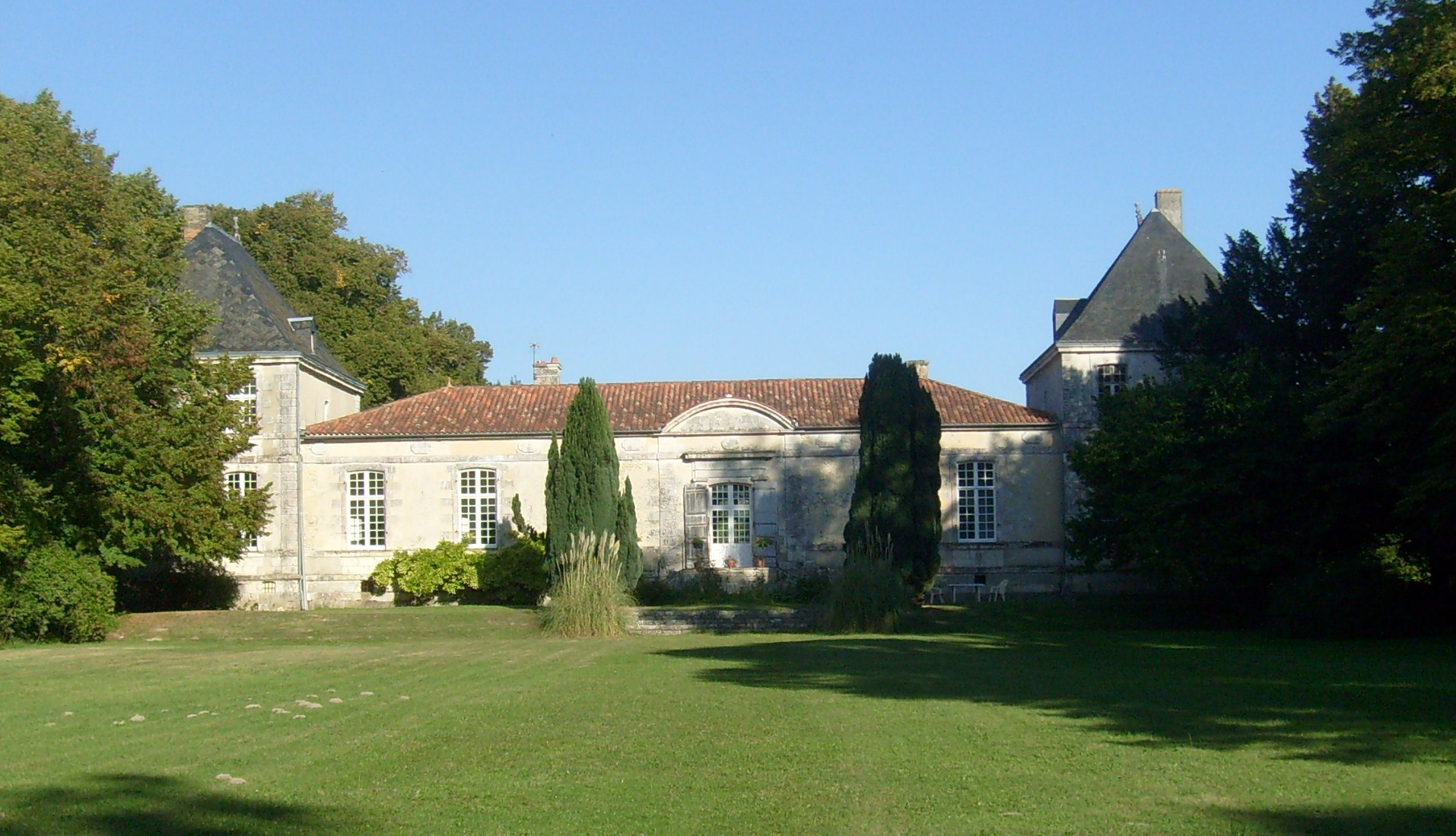
- Chateau des Granges

- Coat of arms
- Location of Virson
- Location within France Location within Nouvelle-Aquitaine
- Coordinates: 46°08′33″N 0°54′20″W
- Country: France
- Region: Nouvelle-Aquitaine
- Department: Charente-Maritime
- Arrondissement: Rochefort
- Canton: Surgères

Government
  - Mayor (2020–2026): Thierry Pillaud
- Area^{1}: 9.92 km^{2} (3.83 sq mi)
- Elevation: 20 m (66 ft)
- Highest elevation: 36 m (118 ft)
- Lowest elevation: 6 m (20 ft)
- Population (2023): 731
  - Density: 73.7/km^{2} (191/sq mi)
- Time zone: UTC+01:00 (CET)
  - Summer (DST): UTC+02:00 (CEST)
- INSEE/Postal code: 17480 /17290
- ^{1} French Land Register data, which excludes lakes, ponds, glaciers > 1 km^{2} (0.386 sq mi or 247 acres) and river estuaries.

Virson (French pronunciation: [viʁsɔ̃]) is a commune in the Charente-Maritime department in the Nouvelle-Aquitaine region in southwestern France. The Atlantic Ocean is situated to the west.

== Population ==
Historical population
Year	Pop.	±% p.a.
1968	292	—
1975	285	−0.35%
1982	363	+3.52%
1990	387	+0.80%
1999	435	+1.31%
2007	656	+5.27%
2012	747	+2.63%
2017	760	+0.35%
2023	731	−0.65%
Source: INSEE

== See also ==
- Communes of the Charente-Maritime department
