= Le Thou =

- Commune
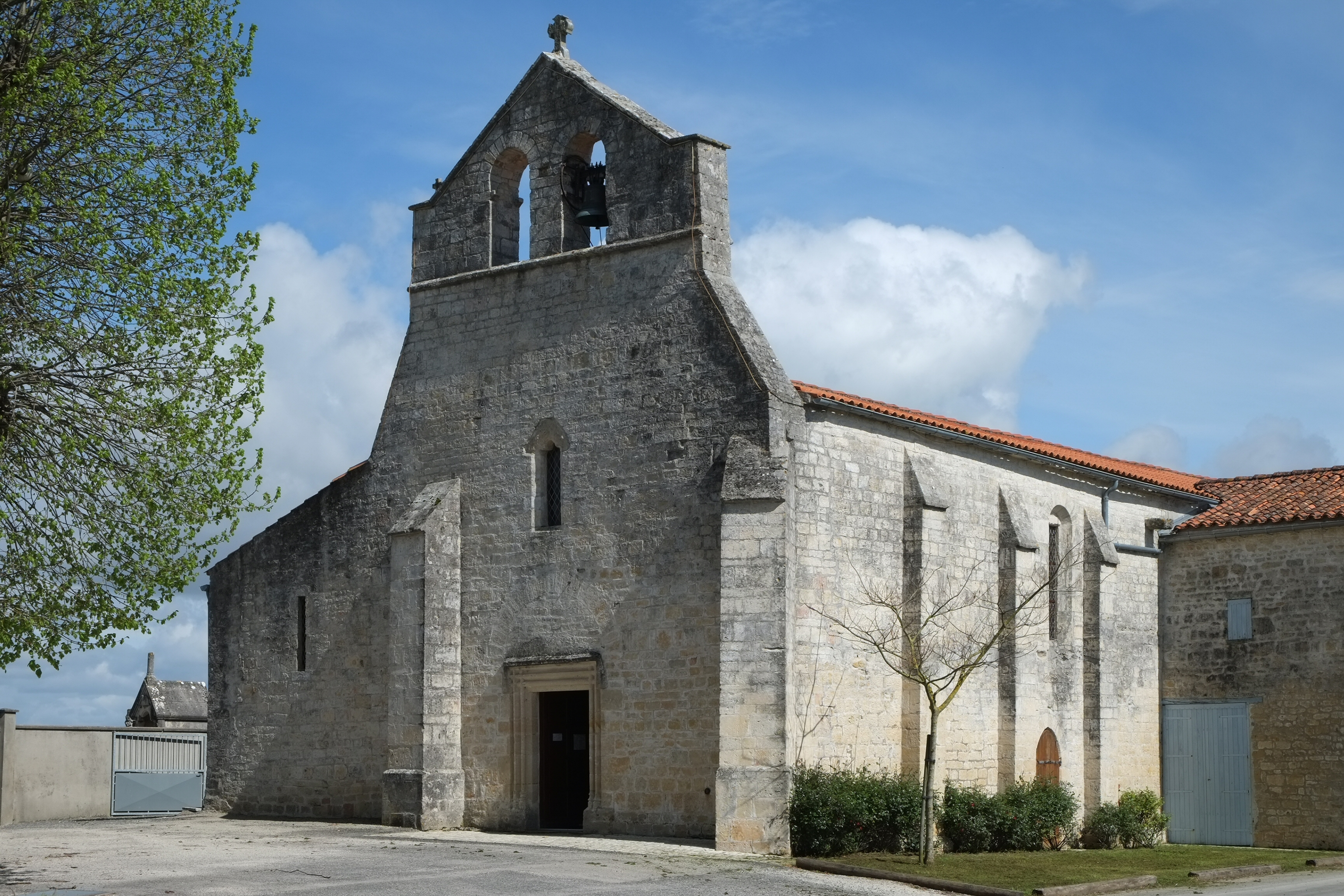
- The church in Le Thou
- Location of Le Thou
- Location within France Location within Nouvelle-Aquitaine
- Coordinates: 46°05′04″N 0°54′56″W
- Country: France
- Region: Nouvelle-Aquitaine
- Department: Charente-Maritime
- Arrondissement: Rochefort
- Canton: Surgères

Government
  - Mayor (2020–2026): Christian Brunier
- Area^{1}: 19 km^{2} (7.3 sq mi)
- Elevation: 24 m (79 ft)
- Highest elevation: 48 m (157 ft)
- Lowest elevation: 15 m (49 ft)
- Population (2023): 2,117
  - Density: 110/km^{2} (290/sq mi)
- Time zone: UTC+01:00 (CET)
  - Summer (DST): UTC+02:00 (CEST)
- INSEE/Postal code: 17447 /17290
- ^{1} French Land Register data, which excludes lakes, ponds, glaciers > 1 km^{2} (0.386 sq mi or 247 acres) and river estuaries.

Le Thou (French pronunciation: [lə tu]) is a commune in the Charente-Maritime department in the Nouvelle-Aquitaine region in southwestern France. The Atlantic Ocean is situated about 10 km to the west.

== Population ==
Historical population
Year	Pop.	±% p.a.
1968	792	—
1975	844	+0.91%
1982	975	+2.08%
1990	1,024	+0.61%
1999	1,170	+1.49%
2007	1,369	+1.98%
2012	1,807	+5.71%
2017	1,900	+1.01%
2023	2,117	+1.82%
Source: INSEE

== See also ==
- Communes of the Charente-Maritime department
