= Ciré-d'Aunis =

- Commune
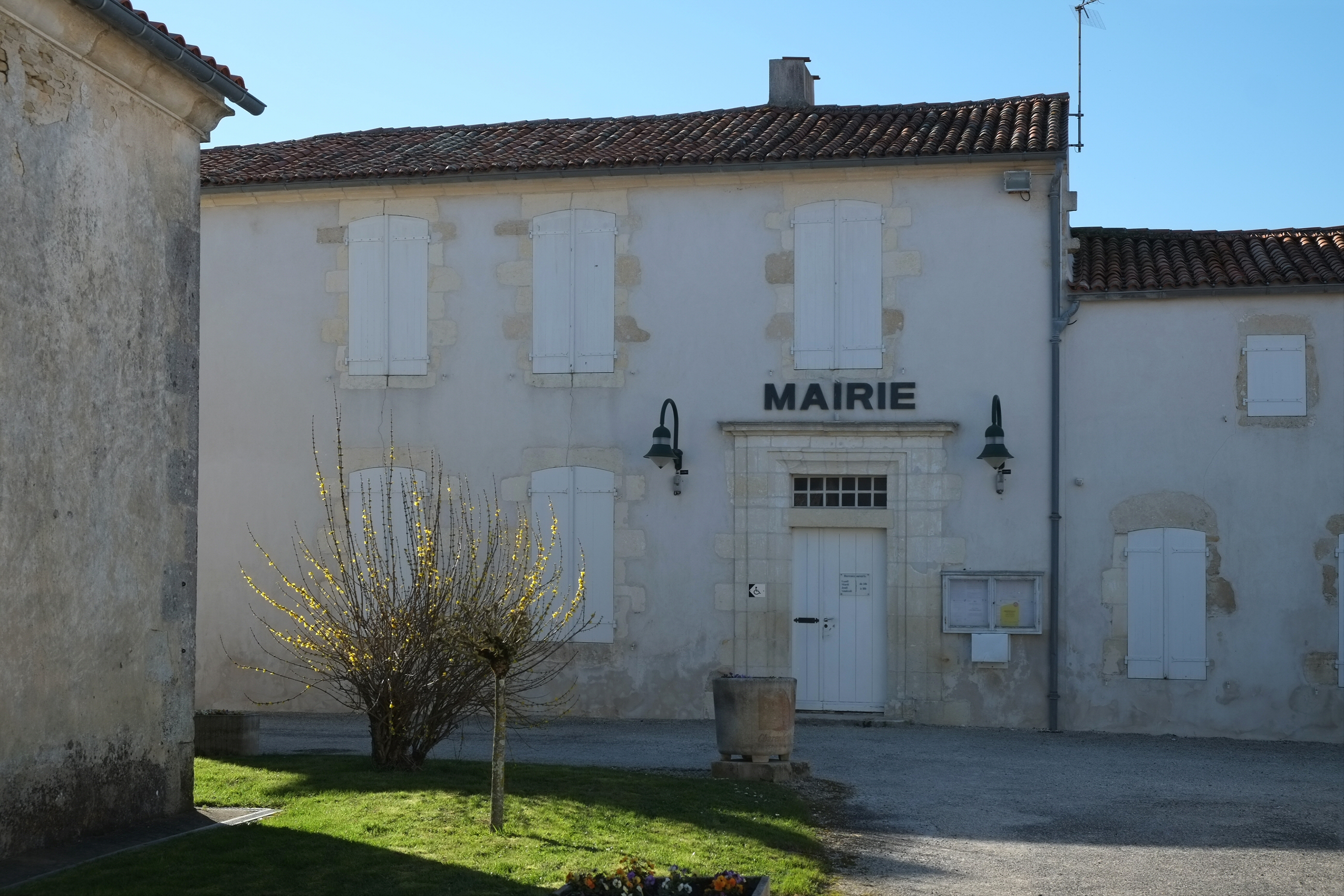
- The town hall in Ciré-d'Aunis

- Coat of arms
- Location of Ciré-d'Aunis
- Location within France Location within Nouvelle-Aquitaine
- Coordinates: 46°03′19″N 0°55′48″W
- Country: France
- Region: Nouvelle-Aquitaine
- Department: Charente-Maritime
- Arrondissement: Rochefort
- Canton: Surgères

Government
  - Mayor (2020–2026): Alisson Curty
- Area^{1}: 25.76 km^{2} (9.95 sq mi)
- Elevation: 15 m (49 ft)
- Highest elevation: 40 m (130 ft)
- Lowest elevation: 0 m (0 ft)
- Population (2023): 1,583
  - Density: 61.45/km^{2} (159.2/sq mi)
- Time zone: UTC+01:00 (CET)
  - Summer (DST): UTC+02:00 (CEST)
- INSEE/Postal code: 17107 /17290
- ^{1} French Land Register data, which excludes lakes, ponds, glaciers > 1 km^{2} (0.386 sq mi or 247 acres) and river estuaries.

Ciré-d'Aunis (French pronunciation: [siʁe doni(s)], literally Ciré of Aunis) is a commune in the Charente-Maritime department in southwestern France.

== Population ==
Historical population
Year	Pop.	±% p.a.
1968	569	—
1975	635	+1.58%
1982	735	+2.11%
1990	686	−0.86%
1999	804	+1.78%
2007	1,136	+4.42%
2012	1,180	+0.76%
2017	1,361	+2.90%
2023	1,583	+2.55%
Source: INSEE

== See also ==
- Communes of the Charente-Maritime department
