= Salviati (surname) =

Salviati is an Italian surname associated with the Salviati families. Notable people with the surname include:

- Antonio Salviati (1816–1890), Italian glass manufacturer
- Antonio Maria Salviati (1537–1602), Florentine cardinal
- Bernardo Salviati (1508–1568), Florentine condottiere and cardinal
- Dorothea von Salviati (1907–1972), wife of Prince Wilhelm of Prussia
- Filippo Salviati (1582–1614), Florentine scientist and astronomer
- Filippo Salviati (bishop) (1578–1634), Italian Roman Catholic bishop
- Francesco Salviati (bishop) (died 1478), archbishop of Pisa, involved in the Pazzi Conspiracy
- Francesco Salviati (painter) (also Francesco de' Rossi, Il Salviati, etc) (1510–1563), Mannerist painter
- Gabriele Salviati (1910–1987), Italian athlete
- Giorgio Benigno Salviati or Juraj Dragišić (died 1520), Bosnian theologian and philosopher
- Giovanni Salviati (1490–1553), Florentine cardinal
- Giuseppe Porta (1520–1575), also known as Giuseppe Salviati, Florentine painter
- Gregorio Salviati (1722–1794), Italian cardinal
- Jacopo Salviati (1461–1533), Florentine nobleman
- Maria Salviati (1499–1543), Florentine noblewoman
- Rino Salviati (1922–2016), Italian singer, guitarist, and film actor
