= Ernest Simoni =

Albanian Catholic cardinal (b. 1928)

His Eminence Ernest Simoni
- Cardinal-Deacon of Santa Maria della Scala
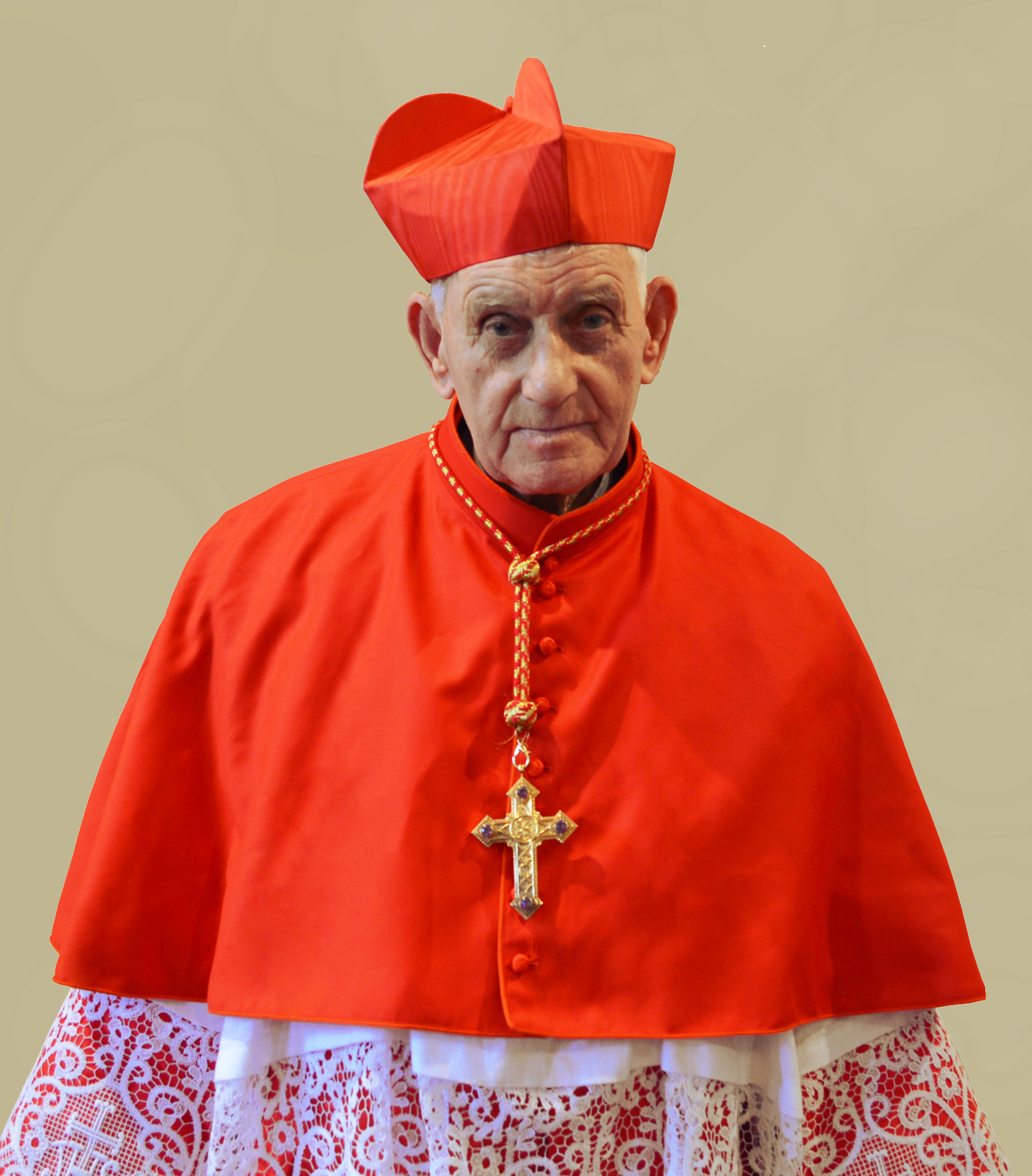
- Church: Catholic Church (Latin Church)
- Appointed: 19 November 2016
- Installed: 11 February 2017
- Predecessor: Stanisław Nagy

Orders
- Ordination: 7 April 1956
- Created cardinal: 19 November 2016 by Pope Francis
- Rank: Cardinal-Deacon

Personal details
- Born: 18 October 1928 (age 98) Troshani, Albanian Kingdom
- Denomination: Catholic Church
- Motto: Zemra jeme dotë triumfojë (Albanian for 'My Immaculate Heart will triumph')
- Styles
- Reference style: His Eminence
- Spoken style: Your Eminence
- Religious style: Cardinal
- Informal style: Cardinal

Ernest Simoni Troshani (born 18 October 1928) is an Albanian Catholic prelate known for being one of the few recent appointees to the College of Cardinals who, prior to his appointment, was not a bishop. He is known for his resistance to persecution under the Albanian Hoxha regime. He was created a cardinal by Pope Francis in a consistory held on 19 November 2016.

== Life ==
Simoni was born in 1928 in Troshani in the Albanian Kingdom.

On 24 December 1963, he was imprisoned by the Communist authorities after offering a Mass for the repose of assassinated U.S. President John F. Kennedy. Simoni was tortured and even offered marriage to leave his faith. He was sentenced to death by firing squad, but ultimately spent 28 years at penal labour after his sentence was converted into a prison term: 18 years working in various mines, followed by a decade in Shkodër's sewage canals.

On 21 September 2014, he met Pope Francis during his apostolic visit to Albania and provided the pope with his own testimony on his experiences under the Communist regime.

On 9 October 2016, Pope Francis announced that he would create Simoni a cardinal in the consistory held on 19 November of the same year. Canon 351 of the Code of Canon Law requires that all cardinals must be bishops, but Simoni was given a papal dispensation from the requirement of episcopal consecration. At the consistory, he was assigned a titular church, becoming Cardinal-Deacon of Santa Maria della Scala. His motto as cardinal is "My Immaculate Heart will triumph" (Zemra jeme dotë triumfojë in his native Albanian) in reference to Our Lady of Fátima.

On 25 October 2025, during the Pontifical High Mass celebrated by Cardinal Raymond Leo Burke as part of the 14th annual Summorum Pontificum Pilgrimage, Simoni offered Pope Leo XIII’s Exorcism against Satan and the Apostate Angels, invoking St. Michael the Archangel.

Simoni returned to Spaç Prison, where he and other political prisoners were once forced to mine copper and pyrite under brutal conditions, to celebrate Mass in remembrance of those who had suffered or died at the camp on 31 July 2026.

Thieves broke into Simoni's residence on Florence's Piazza del Duomo, an apartment Simoni shares with a nephew and his wife, between 1 pm and 11 pm on 18 September 2026. Among the items stolen were Simoni's Italian residence permit, along with some medals, cash, a gold seal and other gold items, plus jewellery and an old PlayStation cable belonging to his nephew's family. Simoni was out of the country at the time of the robbery, having travelled to attend a meeting with King Charles III at Balmoral Castle on the morning of 15 September 2026.

== Honors ==
In 2017, he received the Golden Plate Award of the American Academy of Achievement at an awards ceremony in London.

Catholic Church titles
Preceded by Stanislaw Nagy	Cardinal Deacon of Santa Maria della Scala; 19 November 2016– present	Succeeded by incumbent
