= Santa Maria della Scala =

- Church of Saint Mary of the Stairs
- Chiesa di Santa Maria della Scala
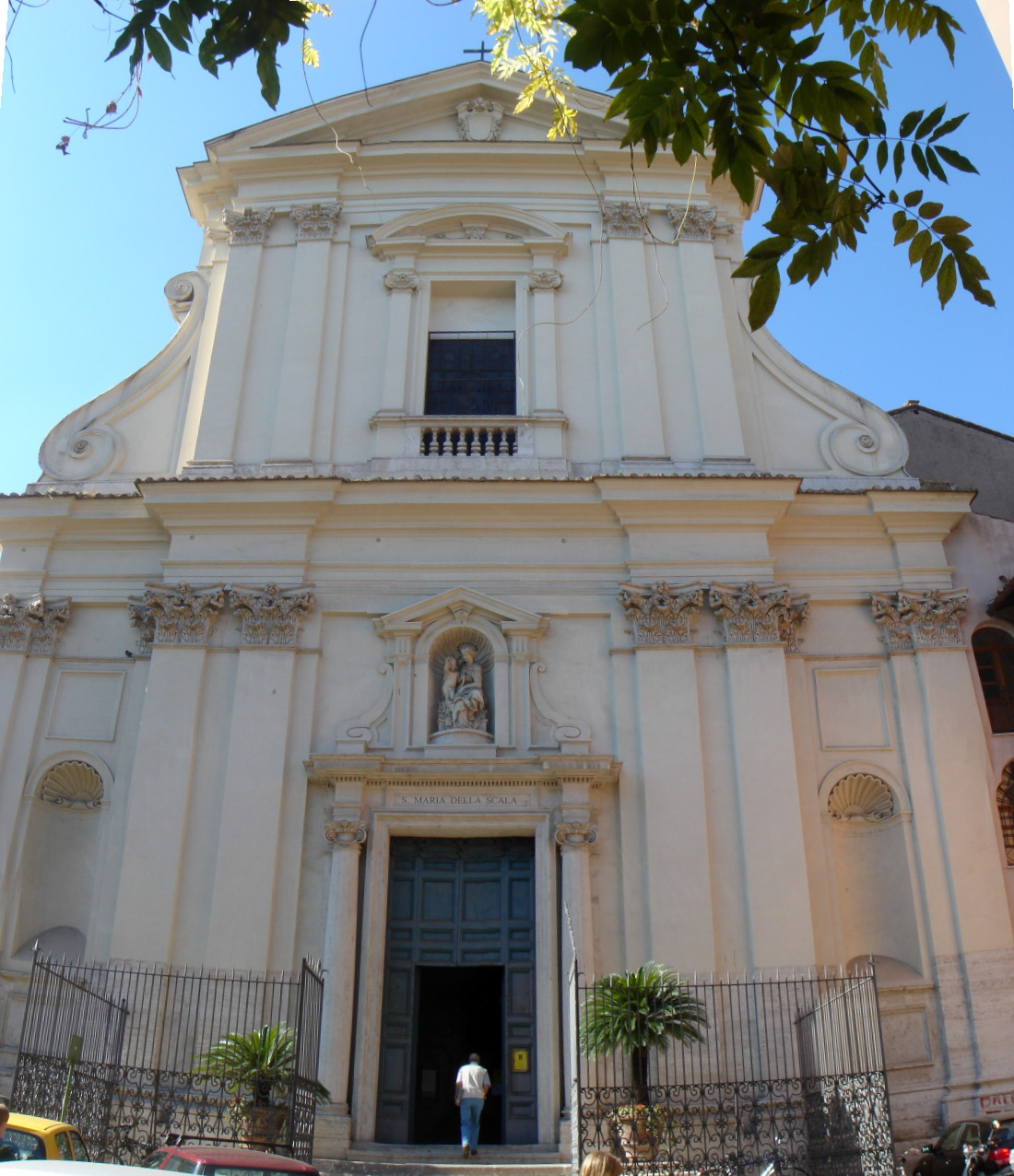
- Facade
- Click on the map for a fullscreen view
- 41°53′28″N 12°28′04″E
- Location: Piazza della Scala 23, Rome
- Country: Italy
- Language: Italian
- Denomination: Catholic
- Tradition: Latin Church
- Religious order: Discalced Carmelites

History
- Status: titular church
- Founded: 1593
- Dedication: Mary, mother of Jesus

Architecture
- Architectural type: Baroque
- Completed: 1610

Administration
- Diocese: Rome

Santa Maria della Scala (English: Mary of the Staircase) is a titular church in Rome, Italy, located in the Trastevere rione. It is served by friars of the Discalced Carmelite Order. Cardinal Ernest Simoni took possession of the titular church on 11 February 2017.

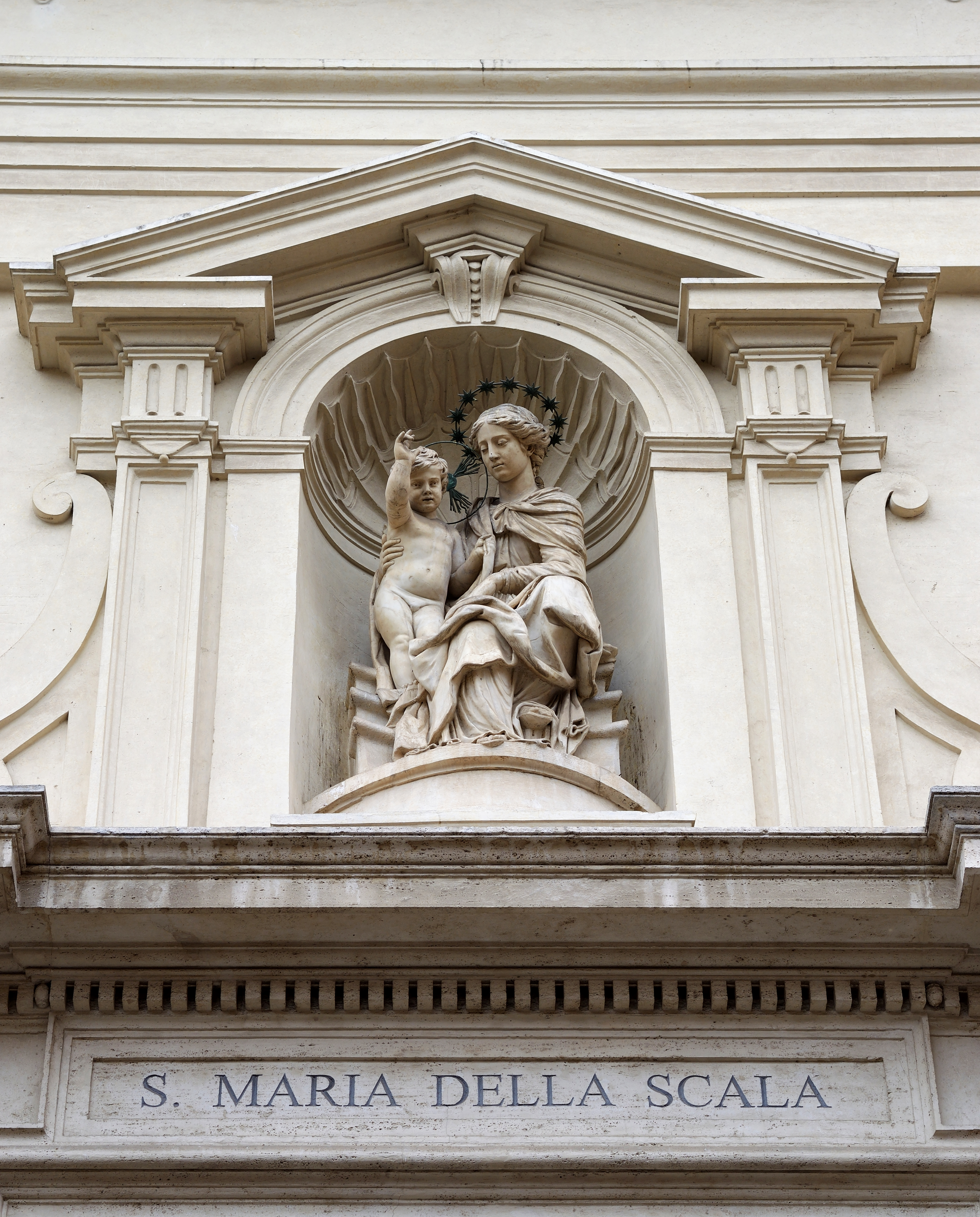
Madonna and Child set into the wall

== History ==
The church Santa Maria della Scala is located on the square of the same name. It was built under the patronage of Pope Clement VIII between 1593 and 1610 to house a miraculous icon of the Madonna. Tradition holds that a midwife with a dying child in her arms prayed under the stairs of a house where the image of the Madonna was present, and the child was immediately revived. Consecrated to Mary, mother of Jesus, the church enshrines that icon in the north transept, alongside a baroque statue of St John of the Cross. The church was built on the site of a house once bequeathed to a Casa Pia founded by Pope Pius IV in 1563 for reformed prostitutes. In 1597, the church was granted to the Discalced Carmelites.

Bronze statues of the Twelve Apostles were stolen from the sacristy during the Napoleonic era, and subsequently replaced by papier-mâché.

In 1849, during the last stages of the revolutionary Roman Republic's resistance to the invading French forces, Santa Maria della Scala was used as a hospital where Garibaldi's soldiers, who were wounded fighting in the Trastevere, were treated.

== Cardinal protectors ==
=== Santa Maria Nuova ===
- Pagano (1088 or later - 1101)
- Teobaldo (about 1102 - 1121)
- Aimerico, C.R.L. (1121 - 1143)
- Giovanni, Can.Reg.S.Fred. (17 December 1143 - 1153)
- Giovanni Pizzuti, C.R.S.V.P. (December 1155 - 1157)
- Girolamo, Can.Reg.S.Fred. (1164 - before 1177)
  - Lanfredo (1166 - about 1168), pseudo-cardinal of Antipope Paschal III
- Matteo, Canon Regular (March 1178 - 1182)
- Albino da Milano, C.R. S. Maria di Crescenziano (1182 - 1185)
- Bernardo, Can.Reg.S.Fred. (12 March 1188 - 1193)
- Pietro Valeriano Duraguerra (17 December 1295 – 17 December 1302)
- Raymond de Got (15 December 1305 – 26 June 1310)
- Guillaume de Farges (19 December 1310 – 5 October 1346)
- Pierre Roger de Beaufort (29 May 1348 - 30 December 1370 elected pope)
- Ludovico di Capua (18 September 1378 - 1380)
  - Amedeo di Saluzzo (or de Saluces) (23 December 1383 – 28 June 1419), pseudo-cardinal of Antipope Clement VII
- Marino Bulcani (20 November 1385 – 8 August 1394)
- Giacopo del Torso (9 May 1408 - 1413)
  - Giacomo Isolani (1420 ? - 9 February 1431 died), pseudo-cardinal of Antipope John XXIII
- Vacant (1431 - 1440)
- Pietro Barbo (1 July 1440 – 16 June 1451)
- Vacant (1451 - 1461)
- Francesco Gonzaga (2 April 1462 – 21 October 1483)
- Giovanni Arcimboldi (15 November 1483 – 2 October 1488)
- Giambattista Orsini (23 March 1489 – 27 February 1493)
- Cesare Borgia (23 September 1493 – 18 August 1498)
- Raymond Peraudi, O.E.S.A., title pro illa vice (29 April 1499 – 5 September 1505)
- Francisco Lloris y de Borja (17 December 1505 – 22 July 1506)
- Sigismondo Gonzaga (16 December 1506 – 3 October 1525)
- Ercole Gonzaga (5 May 1527 – 6 July 1556); title pro illa vice (6 July 1556 – 2 March 1563
- Federico Gonzaga (4 March 1563 ? - 21 February 1565), title pro illa vice
- Ippolito II d'Este (13 April 1565 – 2 December 1572)
- Filippo Guastavillani (14 July 1574 – 8 November 1577)
- Andrew of Austria (11 December 1577 – 12 November 1600)
- Alessandro d'Este (15 November 1600 – 11 January 1621)
- Maurizio di Savoia (17 March 1621 – 19 April 1621)
- Ippolito Aldobrandini (17 May 1621 – 16 March 1626)
- Marzio Ginetti (6 October 1627 – 6 February 1634)
- Vacant (1634 - 1642)
- Giulio Gabrielli (10 February – 10 November 1642)
- Virginio Orsini, O.B.E. (10 November 1642 – 14 March 1644)
- Rinaldo d'Este (28 November 1644 – 12 December 1644)
- Giancarlo de' Medici (1645 - 1656)
- Deaconry suppressed in 1661

=== Santa Maria della Scala ===
- Paolo Savelli (February 1664 – January 1669)
- Buonaccorso Buonaccorsi (May 1670 – April 1678)
- Giovanni Francesco Ginetti (September 1681 – January 1682)
- Johannes Walter Sluse (September 1686 Installed – †Jul 1687)
- Rinaldo d'Este (December 1688 - March 1695)
- Domenico Tarugi (January 1696 - December 1696)
- Vacant (1696 - 1706)
- Carlo Colonna (June 1706 – May 1715)
- Vacant (1715 - 1724)
- Alessandro Falconieri (1724 – 1734)
- Luis Antonio Jaime de Borbón y Farnesio (December 1735 - 18 December 1754)
- Vacant (1754 - 1766)
- Saverio Canale (December 1766 - March 1773)
- Vacant (1773 - 1777)
- Gregorio Salviati (July 1777 – September 1780)
- Vacant (1780 - 1789)
- Filippo Campanelli (August 1789 - November 1790)
- Vacant (1790 - 1800)
- Luis María de Borbón y Vallabriga, pro hac vice (October 1800 - March 1823)
- Vacant (1823 - 1843)
- Paolo Mangelli Orsi (January 1843 - February 1844)
- Vacant (1844 - 1853)
- Prospero Caterini (March 1853 – †October 1881)
- Pietro Lasagni (March 1882 - April 1885)
- Augusto Theodoli (June 1886 – †June 1892)
- Girolamo Maria Gotti, OCD (December 1895 – †March 1916)
- Vacant (1916 - 1921)
- Camillo Laurenti (June 1921 – †September 1938)
- Vacant (1938 - 1946)
- José María Caro Rodríguez (May 1946 – †December 1958)
- Julius August Döpfner (December 1958 - †Jul 1976)
- Vacant (1976 - 1994)
- Carlos Oviedo Cavada, OdeM (November 1994 – †December 1998)
- Nguyễn Văn Thuận (February 2001 – September 2002)
- Stanisław Nagy (October 2003 – June 2013)
- Ernest Simoni (November 2016 – )

== Architecture ==
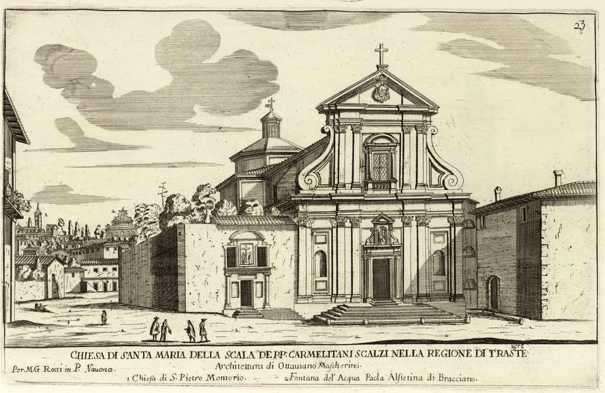
Engraving of the church from c. 1670 (by Giovanni Battista Falda, who is buried in the church)

The two-story travertine facade was completed in 1624. The Baroque Madonna and Child in the niche over the entrance was sculpted by Francesco di Cusart in 1633. In 1650, nearly fifty years after the buildings completion, Carlo Rainaldi designed for the church a tempietto-shaped baldachino with 16 slender jasper Corinthian columns and a high altar. Four statues of the Evangelists were looted in 1849 and replaced by terracotta ones.

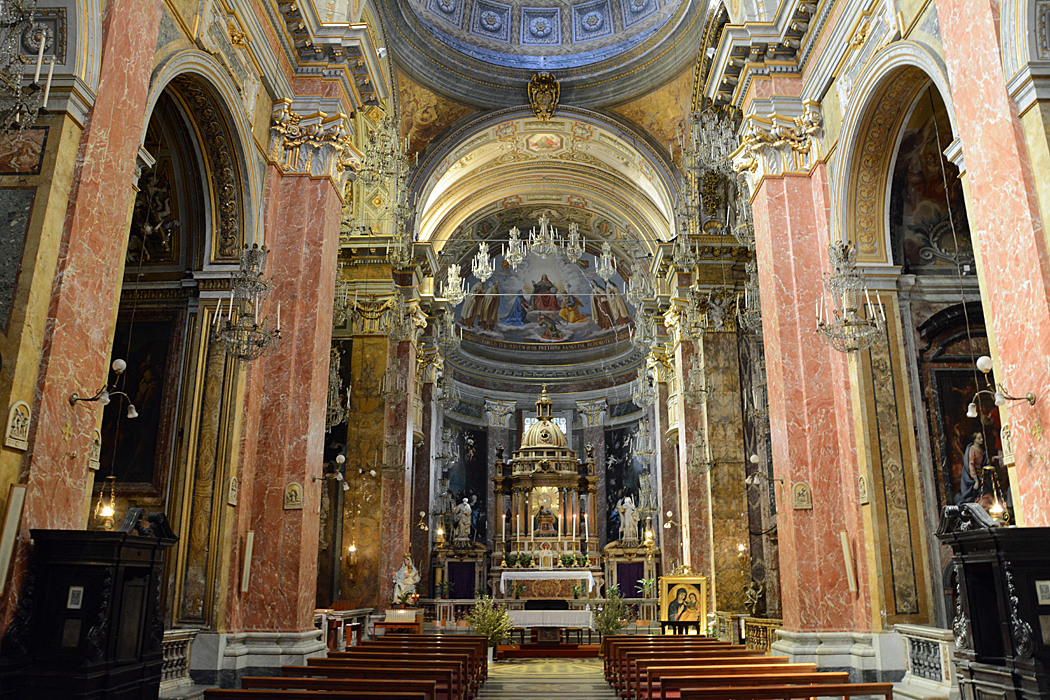
Interior

The interior has a nave with three chapels on each side. Its choir, nave and north transept's vaults are decorated with paintings intended to resemble moldings, whilst the south transept has actual stucco relief moldings.

Following a commission by Cardinal Luigi Antonio di Borbone Spagna, Giuseppe Pannini, the son of Giovanni Paolo Pannini, executed the ornately carved and gilded wooden two-tiered gallery for musicians or cantoria (ca. 1756) above the entrance of the church. The lower gallery houses the pipe organ, built by Carlo Vegezzi Bossi in 1908 (opus 1282) and equipped with 11 registers on a single manual and pedal.

== Chapels ==
- Chapel of Our Lady of Mount Carmel – the first chapel on the left has a painting of the Carmelite Simon Stock by Cristoforo Roncalli.
- Chapel of the Assumption – lawyer Laerzio Cherubini had commissioned a painting from Caravaggio suitable as an altarpiece for the second chapel on the left. This was the Death of the Virgin. Rumors held that Caravaggio had used a prostitute as a model for the dead virgin. The Carmelites rejected the painting, which was then purchased by Vincenzo Gonzaga, Duke of Mantua. When Caravaggio's "Death of the Virgin" was rejected in 1606, it was Carlo Saraceni who provided an acceptable substitute, which remains in situ. Above the altar is a statue of the Infant Jesus of Prague.
- Chapel of the Crucifixion
- Chapel of St John the Baptist – the first chapel on the right is dedicated to St John the Baptist. The altarpiece, the "Beheading of St. John the Baptist", is by Gerrit van Honthorst.
- Chapel of St Hyacinth – the second chapel on the right is dedicated to St Hyacinth; the altarpiece of "Our Lady with SS Hyacinth and Catherine of Siena" is by Antiveduto Grammatica.
- Chapel of St Joseph – the third chapel on the right contains Giovanni Odazzi's Dream of Joseph.
- Chapel of Our Lady of the Stairs – the left side transept holds the original miraculous icon.
- Chapel of the Relic - left of the sanctuary, this chapel contains a relic of St Teresa of Avila.
- Chapel of St Teresa of Jesus – the right transept altar is dedicated to St Teresa of Avila.

== Art and decoration ==
San Giuseppe Hall houses a collection by Tito Sarrocchi.

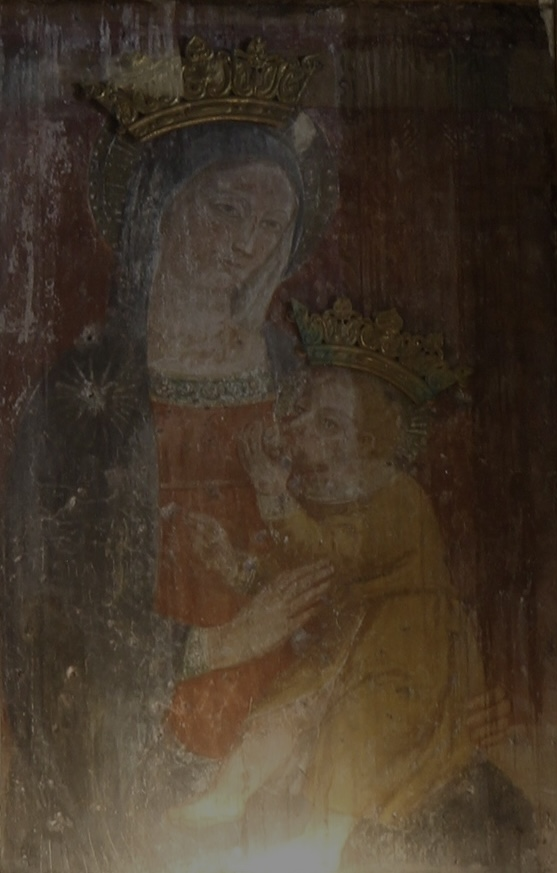
The miraculous image of Madonna della Scala, Crowned by the Vatican Chapter in 1646 with decree from Pope Innocent X

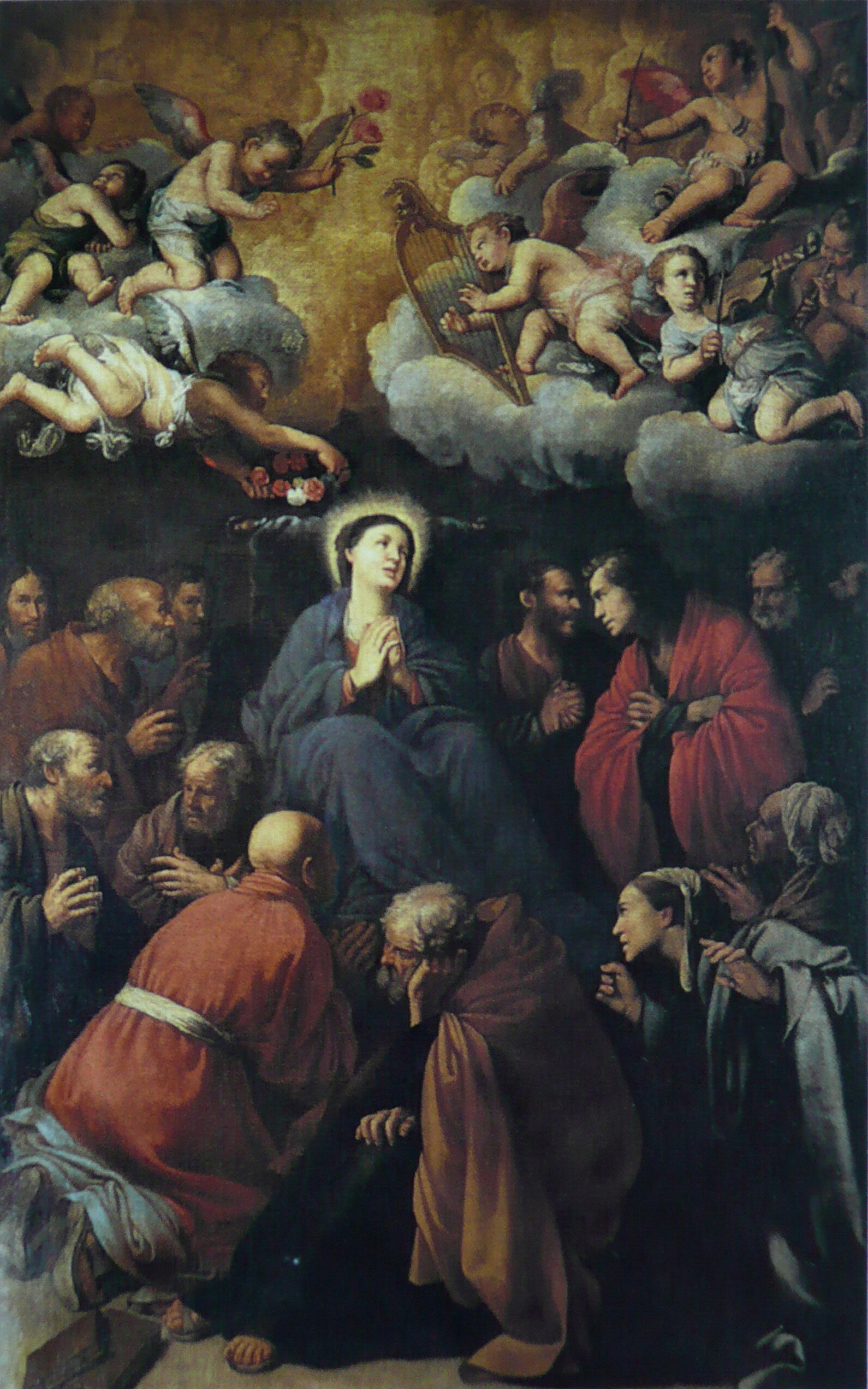
Death of the Virgin, Carlo Saraceni

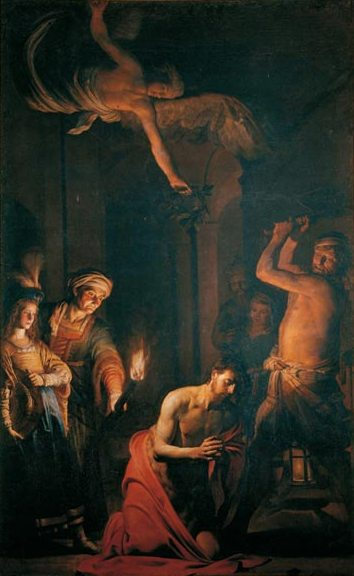
Decollazione del Battista, Gerrit van Hothorst

== Burials ==
- Giovanni Antonio Guadagni
- Nguyễn Văn Thuận

== Pharmacy ==
Around 1600, the friars built a monastery next door famous for containing the Papal court's 17th century pharmacy (Antica Spezieria di Santa Maria della Scala) on the second floor. The friars prepared their medicines with herbs from the attached garden. In the 18th century, the apothecary also began to train future pharmacists. In 1873 the convent and garden was confiscated by the government and the convent turned into a police station; the Carmelites retained the church.

The former pharmacy now houses a museum, containing the herbarium, and the original scales for weighing medicines, the machines for making pills, oil mills, mortars, and alembic stills. The furnishings, shelves, showcases and counter are from the eighteenth century.
