= Francesco Salviati =

Francesco Salviati may refer to:

- Francesco Salviati (bishop) (died 1478), archbishop of Pisa, involved in the Pazzi Conspiracy
- Francesco Salviati (painter) (also Francesco de' Rossi, Il Salviati, etc) (1510–1563), Mannerist painter

== See also ==
- Salviati (disambiguation)
