= Saint-Pierre-la-Noue =

- Commune
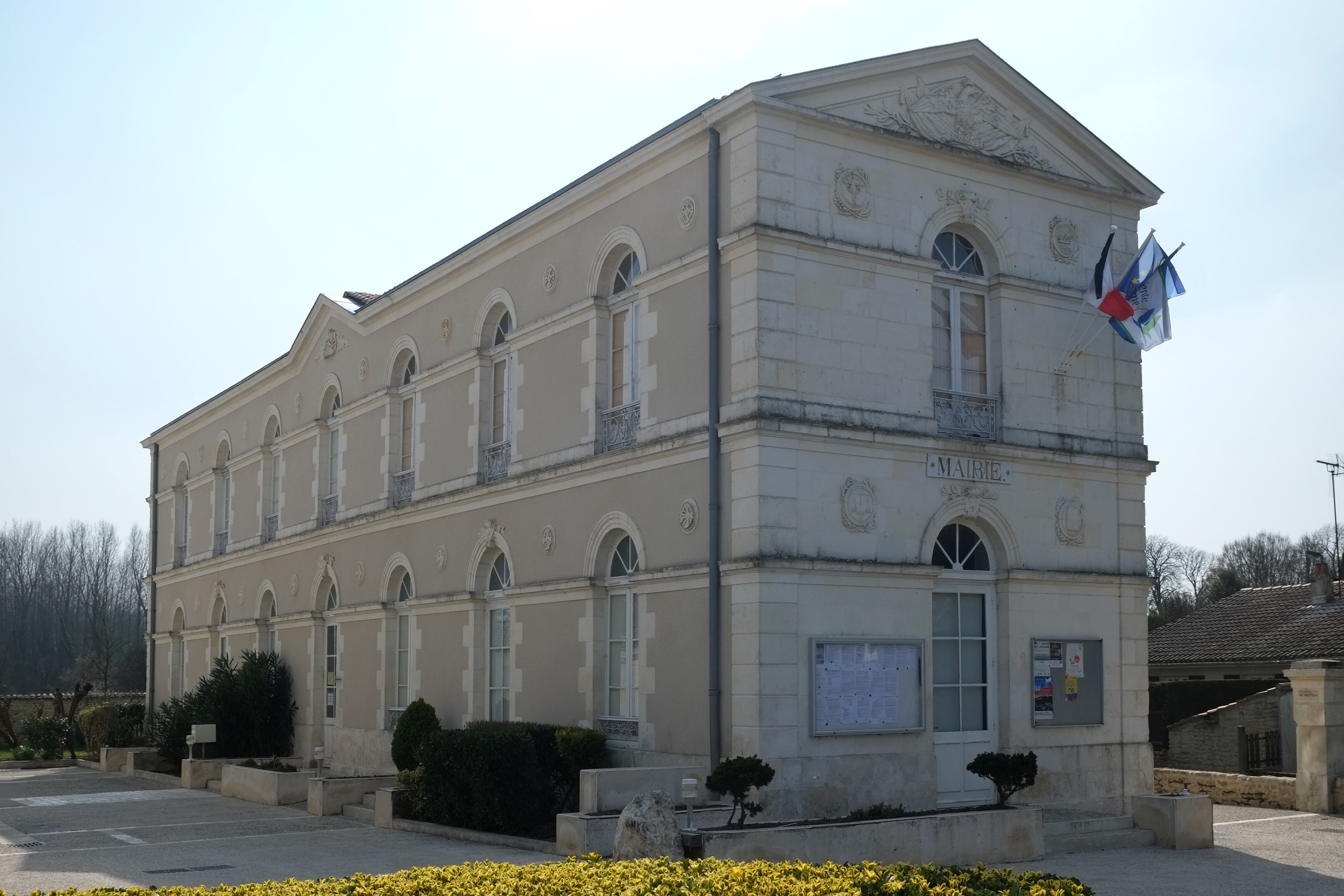
- The town hall in Saint-Pierre-la-Noue
- Location of Saint-Pierre-la-Noue
- Location within France Location within Nouvelle-Aquitaine
- Coordinates: 46°04′44″N 0°47′16″W
- Country: France
- Region: Nouvelle-Aquitaine
- Department: Charente-Maritime
- Arrondissement: Rochefort
- Canton: Surgères
- Intercommunality: Aunis Sud

Government
  - Mayor (2024–2026): Christophe Foloppe
- Area^{1}: 24.91 km^{2} (9.62 sq mi)
- Population (2023): 1,486
  - Density: 59.65/km^{2} (154.5/sq mi)
- Time zone: UTC+01:00 (CET)
  - Summer (DST): UTC+02:00 (CEST)
- INSEE/Postal code: 17340 /17700
- ^{1} French Land Register data, which excludes lakes, ponds, glaciers > 1 km^{2} (0.386 sq mi or 247 acres) and river estuaries.

Saint-Pierre-la-Noue (French pronunciation: [sɛ̃ pjɛʁ la nu]) is a commune in the department of Charente-Maritime within southwestern France. The municipality was established on 1 March 2018 with the merge of the former communes of Saint-Germain-de-Marencennes (the seat) and Péré.

== See also ==
- Communes of the Charente-Maritime department
