= Alamanno Salviati =

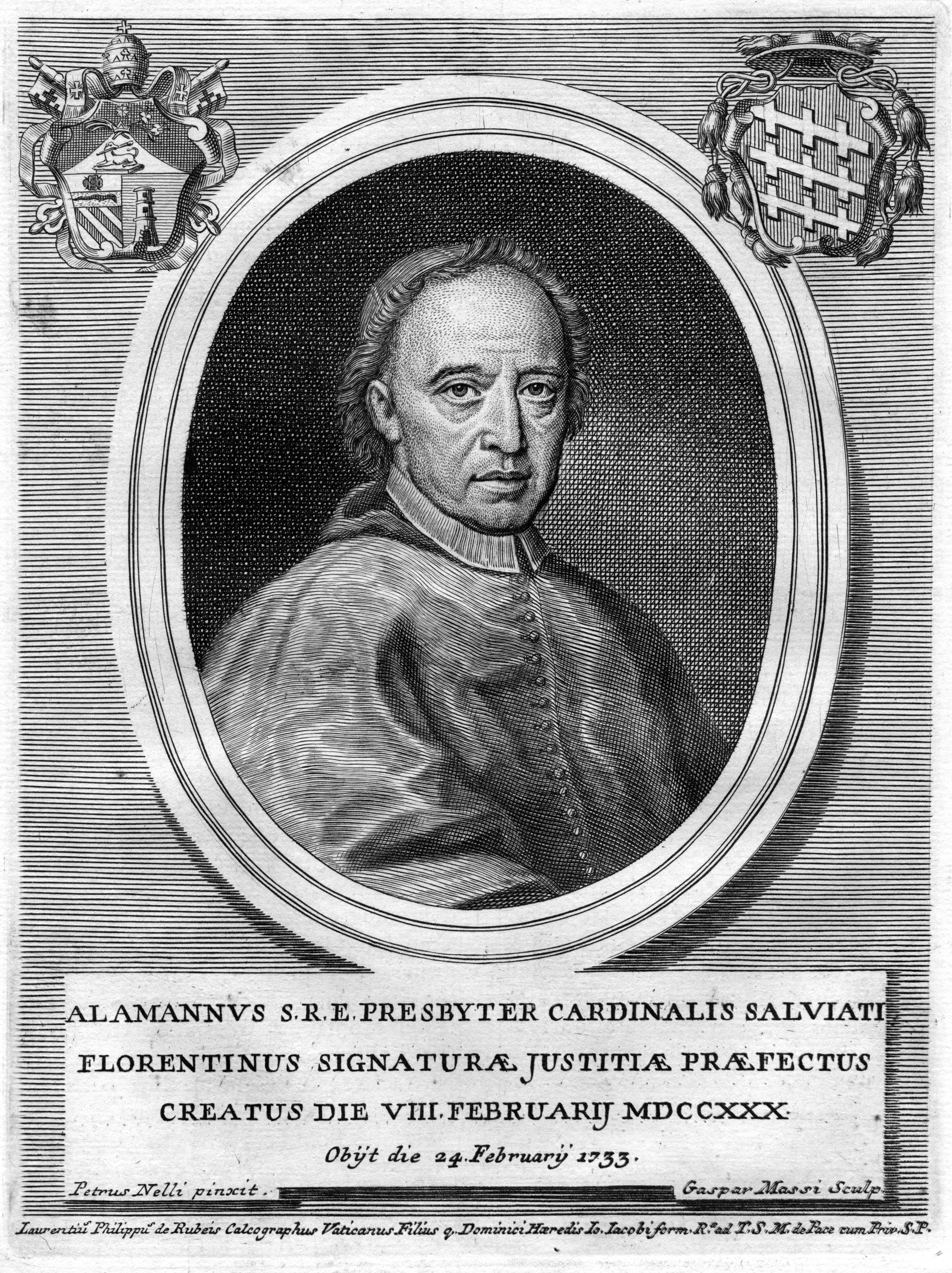
Alamanno Salviti Portrait

Alamanno Salviati (20 March 1669 – 24 February 1733) was an Italian Roman Catholic cardinal.

He was a descendant of Jacopo Salviati, and born in Florence to the prominent Salviati family. He was named a cardinal on 8 February 1730. The same year, he was installed as Cardinal priest of the church of Santa Maria in Ara Coeli of Rome. He participated in the conclave of 1730. A son of Jacopo, named Alamanno, was a prominent politician in the early 16th century.
