= Péré, Charente-Maritime =

Péré
- Part of Saint-Pierre-la-Noue
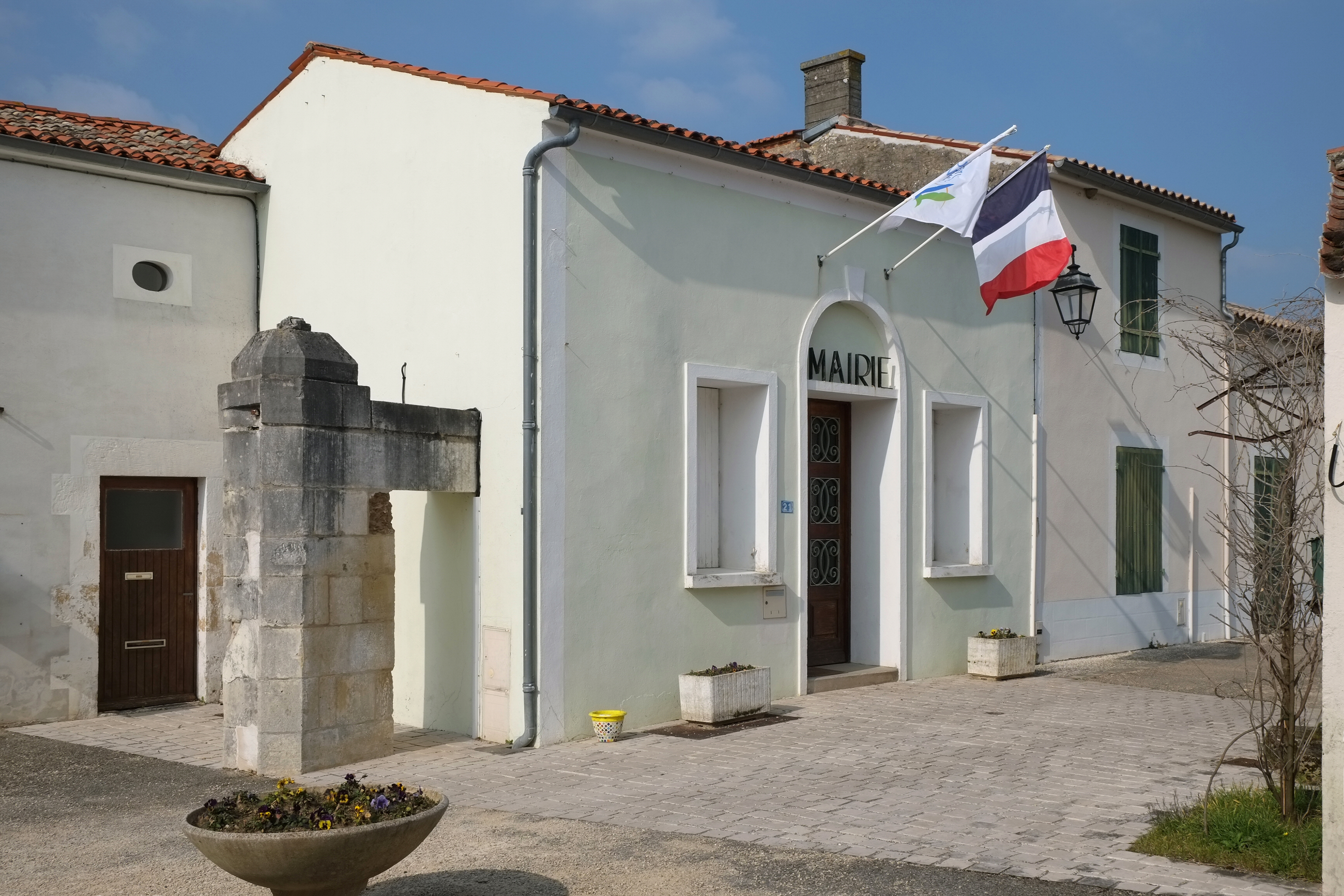
- Town hall
- Location of Péré
- Location within France Location within Nouvelle-Aquitaine
- Coordinates: 46°05′30″N 0°48′57″W
- Country: France
- Region: Nouvelle-Aquitaine
- Department: Charente-Maritime
- Arrondissement: Rochefort
- Canton: Surgères
- Commune: Saint-Pierre-la-Noue
- Area^{1}: 8.44 km^{2} (3.26 sq mi)
- Elevation: 33 m (108 ft)
- Highest elevation: 42 m (138 ft)
- Lowest elevation: 11 m (36 ft)
- Population (2023): 349
  - Density: 41.4/km^{2} (107/sq mi)
- Time zone: UTC+01:00 (CET)
  - Summer (DST): UTC+02:00 (CEST)
- Postal code: 17700
- ^{1} French Land Register data, which excludes lakes, ponds, glaciers > 1 km^{2} (0.386 sq mi or 247 acres) and river estuaries.

Péré (French pronunciation: [peʁe]) is a former commune in the Charente-Maritime department in southwestern France. On 1 January 2018, it was merged into the new commune of Saint-Pierre-la-Noue.

== See also ==
- Communes of the Charente-Maritime department
