= Raymond Peraudi =

French Augustinian, papal legate and Cardinal

His Eminence Raymond Peraudi (Peraud)
- Cardinal-Priest
- Church: Santa Maria in Cosmedin; San Vitale; Santa Maria Nuova
- Diocese: Gurk (1491-1501); Maguelone, Administrator (1498-1499); Toul, Administrator (1501); Saintes (1505)
- Other posts: Legate in Perugia; Legate in Viterbo

Orders
- Ordination: unknown by unknown
- Consecration: unknown by unknown
- Created cardinal: 20 September 1493 by Pope Alexander VI
- Rank: Cardinal Deacon, then Cardinal Priest

Personal details
- Born: c. 1435 Saint-Germain-de-Marencennes FR
- Died: 5 September 1505 Viterbo IT
- Buried: Santissima Trinità; Viterbo
- Residence: France, Germany, Rome
- Occupation: diplomat, fundraiser
- Profession: bishop
- Education: Doctor of theology (Paris)

Raymond Peraudi (1435–1505) was a French Augustinian, papal legate, and Cardinal. He was a perpetual traveler, engaging in diplomatic negotiations at various times for the pope, the emperor and the king of France. He was an effective administrator of territories belonging to the Roman Church. In his various assignments to preach indulgences for a Crusade or for the Jubilee of 1500, he became an early point of controversy in the dispute over the efficacy of indulgences, and the right of the pope to grant them.

== Education ==
Raymond Peraudi was born in 1435 in the small village of Saint-Germain-de-Marencennes, some three miles southwest of Surgères, in the Aunis in western France. He was placed in the Augustinian cloister of Saint Aegidius in Surgères, from which he was sent to study in Paris, where he became a bursary member of the Collège de Navarre. He obtained the degree of doctor of theology. He returned to Surgères and was elected or appointed Prior of Saint-Aegidius. In 1472 and 1473 King Louis XI stayed in Surgères, where he was campaigning, and it is conjectured that it was at that time that the King came to know Peraudi, whom he appointed one of his Aumoniers.

== Early career ==
Pope Sixtus IV (1471–1484) was concerned about the deteriorated condition of a number of French cathedrals. His attention to the situation at Saintes in particular was drawn by King Louis XI. On 3 August 1476 the Pope confirmed the plenary indulgences previously granted to the cathedral, but now on the condition that persons seeking the indulgence actually visit the church and contribute a sum of money for the repair of the fabric, either to the Chapter or to the local papal collector of revenues. He extended the indulgence to the benefit of souls in Purgatory designated by the persons making the offering. This action raised protests from monks and preachers, including Jean de Fabrica and the Rector of the University of Poitiers Nicolas Richard, who argued that the pope did not have jurisdiction over souls in Purgatory; and that the system favored the rich over the poor. To make the attacks stop, Pope Sixtus issued a letter of explanation on 27 November 1477, which did nothing to calm the criticism. Finally, at the demand of Louis XI, he issued another letter, dated 26 April 1482 and addressed to Raymond Peraud, Archdeacon of Aunis; it declared that the indulgences in effect before his bull of 1476 were still in effect with their original force, hoping thereby to remove the irritant to the locals. The controversy continued however, and in due course was taken up by Martin Luther.

In 1481 King Louis XI sent an embassy to the Pope, intending to stir up enthusiasm in Italy for a crusade against the Turks, but also to show that he did not intend to allow Ferdinand I of Naples to be a dominant power in Italy. The third member of the embassy was Raymond Peraud. They arrived in Rome on Ash Wednesday, and turned over to the papal treasury 300,000 ducats which had been collected in France for the crusade. On April 1 the Pope awarded Louis XI the Golden Rose. It was during this embassy that Peraudi was awarded the title of Protonotary Apostolic. In June 1482 Sixtus IV sent Peraudi as nuncio to France.

In 1486 Peraudi was sent on an embassy to the Emperor Frederick III, in order to win him over to papal policies. Peraudi took part in the Diet of Speyer and the Diet of Nuremberg. After the Diet of Nuremberg the Emperor sent Peraudi to Rome to obtain the condemnation of a criminous clerk from the Pope; his request was granted. On 20 April 1487, Pope Innocent VIII made yet another appeal against the Turks and imposed a tax of a tenth of the annual income of ecclesiastics. Protests were loud, especially in Germany. Peraudi was immediately sent back to Germany to proclaim the indulgence being granted for the crusade. On 22 March 1488, as Orator, Nuntius and Commissarius, he published the decree of indulgences at Mainz. In 1489, one of the sub-Collectors on Peraudi's staff, Antonius Mast, was sent to Sweden, and in October began to preach the crusade against the Turks in Stockholm. In 1490 he published the same indulgences in Sweden, Norway, Denmark, Livonia, Prussia and Russia.

In 1488 Raymond Peraudi was certainly a Protonotary Apostolic. He was still Archdeacon of Aunis in the Church of Saintes when he was sent as nuncio to Germany in 1490 by Pope Innocent VIII to collect money for a crusade against the Turks.

In February 1490 he was at Linz, and writing to Albert of Bavaria. In June he was in Tours, having been sent by the Emperor and the King of the Romans to assist in peace negotiations with Brittany. The papal nuncio, Antonio Flores wrote to Pope Innocent, "Peraud seems a worthy but loquacious and vain man; his participation in this embassy is merely nominal and ceremonial; but he maintains a multitude of couriers, and sends them off with the earliest news, to gain personal importance." On 19 June 1490, King Charles VIII wrote to the cardinals in Rome to convince the Pope to keep nostre amé et feal conseillier Raymond Peyraud in his position as Legate to the Emperor and King of the Romans. On 13 September he wrote to the Pope, asking that Peyraud not be recalled to Rome but to be allowed to continue in his German legation.

He was approved as bishop of Gurk in Consistory by Pope Innocent VIII on 21 February 1491, and, unusually, was allowed to retain the diocese when he became a cardinal in 1493. He finally resigned the diocese on 6 October 1501.

== Cardinal ==
Bishop Peraldi was recommended for a red hat both by Maximilian, King of the Romans, and by King Charles VIII of France. He was named a cardinal on 20 September 1493 by Pope Alexander VI, and was granted the Deaconry of Santa Maria in Cosmedin on 23 September. He finally appeared in Rome on 22 April 1494, having returned from his German legation, and was received in Consistory the next day by Pope Alexander and given his red hat. On 25 May, Trinity Sunday, the Cardinal of Gurk sang the solemn mass in the papal chapel in the presence of the Pope. He was promoted a Cardinal priest by 17 October 1494, and assigned the titular church of San Vitale, Rome.

=== War ===
Unfortunately for the peace of the Italian peninsula, King Ferdinand I of Naples died on 25 January 1494. This gave King Charles VIII of France the pretext he needed to assert his right to the throne of Naples, however weak it was. Pope Alexander VI, however, accepted the claim of Ferdinand's son Alfonso, who was crowned by the Papal Legate on 8 May. The Pope, who was the feudal overlord of Naples, also had ambitions to carve out a principality for at least one of his sons. King Charles immediately launched his campaign, crossing into Italy with 25,000 troops in September. Milan fell to his troops, and he installed his ally Ludovico Sforza as Duke rather than Regent. Charles was in Pavia on 21 October, and in Pisa on 8 November. The foolish behavior of Piero di Lorenzo de' Medici brought about a revolution in Florence. Pope Alexander was frantic as the French army moved through Tuscany as far as Nepi; he was in a state of terror when French troops seized Ostia. Pope Alexander had no ready cash and fewer than 2,000 troops, mostly Spanish. He could barely expect to defend the Castel Sant'Angelo. On 6 October, he attempted to send a Legate, Cardinal Francesco Tedeschini-Piccolomini, to negotiate with King Charles. He found the King at Lucca on 8 October, but Charles would not even receive him.

On 31 October 1494, Cardinal Peraudi informed Joannes Burchard that he intended to resign the diocese of Gurk, under certain conditions related to pensions, and that he had decided on Burchard as his successor. Burchard protested his unworthiness and asked for time to consider the offer. Next day the Cardinal celebrated the solemn Mass for the Feast of All Saints in St. Peter's Basilica in the presence of the Pope. Nothing came of the intention to resign. Perhaps the incident was only Peraudi's nervous reaction to an increasingly difficult personal situation.

On 2 November Cardinal Ascanio Sforza came to Rome and had extensive and frank talks with Alexander, advising him to adopt a neutral position, but Alexander would not abandon King Alfonso. On 14 November, after the failure of Piccolomini's mission, the Pope appointed Cardinal Raymond Peraudi as his Legate to the King, who was to tell the King that the Pope was eager to come to meet him. The King replied that, on the contrary, he was eager to visit the Pope in his palace in Rome. The King also had private discussions with Peraudi, and using Peraudi's eagerness for a crusade, won his confidence and support. He followed in the King's train when he entered Rome on 31 December 1494. Among the terms of the treaty signed by Pope Alexander and King Charles on 15 January 1495, the Pope was to confirm Cardinal Peraudi in his bishopric of Gurk (in other words, the Pope was not to attempt to take it away from him). Nonetheless, Peraudi was bold enough to go to the Pope later that week and ventilate his grievances with him. Peraudi was aware of and greatly disturbed by the simony that seemed to be found everywhere that Alexander went. He was also scandalized about the Pope's dealing with the Turkish government and with King Charles VIII over the person of the Sultan's brother Djem. By December 16, 1494, the Cardinal had obtained the documents of the Turkish envoy, Giorgio Buzard, who had been detained at Senigallia. They included the envoy's Instructions from the Pope, as well as correspondence between the Sultan Bejazet and Pope Alexander. Peraudi accused the Pope of infamia in his dealings concerning the person of Djem. The Sultan suggested that the Pope should have him assassinated, and, when the body was sent to Constantinople, he would pay the Pope 300,000 ducats.

=== Papal governor, in opposition ===
By 1 January 1497, the Cardinal of Gurk was already Cardinal Priest of Santa Maria Nuova, as Joannes Burchard notes in his list of the forty living cardinals drawn up on that date. In January 1497 the Cardinal was in Milan, where he happened to meet Leonardo da Vinci. He was named Governor of Foligno by Pope Alexander VI, though he preferred visiting Perugia, to the annoyance of the Pope. He was threatened with excommunication in March 1497 unless he returned to Foligno or came back to Rome. At Perugia he confided to the Florentine Secretary Alessandro Braccesi (who immediately reported the conversation to his government) that he planned to return to Foligno and wait for the appearance of Charles VIII in Italy, and then confer with him; on no account did he intend to go to Rome. La sua intentione non versabatur nisi in malo. ('[Pope Alexander] was always planning something evil') The Pope was negotiating an alliance with the Turks and with Venice. He advised the Florentines to maintain their friendly relationship with the French.

== Legate ==
In 1498, Peraudi was in France on papal business, working to put together a league to include the Papacy, the French, and Venice. On 7 April King Charles VIII died suddenly, and Peraudi conducted the first funeral service for him at Amboise.

The Cardinal was named Administrator in commendam of the diocese of Maguelone on 4 July 1498, which he resigned on 19 March 1499. A letter was read from Peraudi in Consistory in Rome on 12 November 1498, in which Peraudi said that he had been at Lyon and was at Avignon, and that he was returning to Rome. On 16 January 1499, he was between Bologna and Florence, and on 10 February he arrived in Rome. Next morning he had an audience with the Pope.

The Cardinal of Gurk was appointed Legate in Perugia and Todi on 11 October 1499. On All Souls Day, 2 November 1499, he celebrated Mass in the Vatican, in the presence of the Pope. He returned to Rome on 6 March 1500, without leave. He went back to Perugia, but returned to Rome again on 27 June.

On 5 October 1500, Peraudi was named Legate to the King of the Romans. His official purpose was to preach the Jubilee indulgence in Germany, Denmark, Sweden, and Prussia. His instructions were to persuade the King of the Romans not to invade Italy, but to direct his forces against the Turks in the Balkans; and to settle his differences with the King of France. He left Rome for Germany on 29 October. He travelled by way of the Tyrol to Constanz, and from there to Halle, where he can be found on 25 January 1502. From there he visited Strasbourg, Speyer and Mainz. After a long stay in Mainz, he moved to Trier, then Cologne, and then Bonn, and from Bonn to Frankfurt. He stayed some time in Frankfurt, meeting with the princes at the end of June; from there he moved to Ulm. He then spent some time in Strasbourg. In the summer of 1503 he was at Würzburg, then Frankfurt again, and then, at the end of October, Cologne. From mid-October to the end of December 1503 he was in Erfurt, and visited other places in Saxony. He visited Frankfurt, Worms and Speyer once again, and then, in January 1504, Strasbourg again, where he remained for the winter until April. He then visited Basel on his way to the St. Gotthard Pass and Italy. He finally returned to the Roman Curia on 23 October 1504. It was an amazing feat of physical stamina for a man beyond his mid-sixties. There was a grand dispute as to whether Peraudi should be received with the ceremonial appropriate to a Papal Legate or not, until the Pope clarified that Peraudi had been recalled by Pope Alexander, but had been confirmed in office by himself. Peraudi's Auditor produced the breve of Pope Julius by which he had confirmed the Legateship.

He was named bishop of Toul for a short time in 1501, from 16 July to 22 October, in confused circumstances.

At Easter 1505, Cardinal Peraudi sang the Mass of the Resurrection in the presence of Pope Julius II. On 7 May 1505 he participated in a Secret Consistory. Peraudi was appointed Legate of the Patrimony of St. Peter, with his headquarters at Viterbo. On 19 July 1505 he was named Administrator of the diocese of Saintes, following the resignation of Bishop Pierre de Rochechouart.

Cardinal Raymond Peraudi died at Viterbo on 5 September 1505, and was buried in the Augustinian church of Santissima Trinità.

== Sources ==
- Arcère, Louis-Etienne (1756). Histoire de la ville de La Rochelle et du pays d'Aulnis (in French). Vol. Tome premier. La Rochelle: R.-J. Desbordes. pp. 296–301.
- Bertrand, Louis-André (1887). Biographie du cardinal Péraud, évêque de Saintes (in French). La Rochelle: P. Dubois.
- Burchard, Joannes (1883). Louis Thuasne (ed.). Diarum sine rerum urbanarum commentarii (in French and Latin). Vol. Tome premier (1483-1492). Paris: Ernest Leroux.
- Burchard, Joannes (1884). Louis Thuasne (ed.). Diarum sine rerum urbanarum commentarii (in Latin). Vol. Tome second (1492-1499). Paris: E. Leroux.
- Burchard, Joannes (1885). Louis Thuasne (ed.). Diarum sine rerum urbanarum commentarii (in Latin). Vol. Tome troisième (1500-1506). Paris: E. Leroux.
- Creighton, Mandell (1887). A History of the Papacy during the Period of the Reformation. Vol. III: The Italian Princes, 1464–1518. London: Longmans, Green, and Company.
- Ehrstine, Glenn (2018). "Raymond Peraudi in Zerbst: Corpus Christi Theater, Material Devotion, and the Indulgence Microeconomy on the Eve of the Reformation", Speculum, 93 (2018), 319–56.
- Eubel, Conradus. W. Gulik (ed.). Hierarchia catholica medii aevi, sive Summorum pontificum, S.R.E. cardinalium, ecclesiarum antistitum series, editio altera, Tomus II (Monasterii 1913). (in Latin)
- Gulik, Guilelmus (1923). Eubel, Conradus (ed.). Hierarchia catholica, Tomus 3 (second ed.). Münster: Libreria Regensbergiana.
- Gottlob, Adolf (1885). "Der Legat Raimund Peraudi," Historisches Jahrbuch 6 (1885), pp. 438–461. (in German) [Fraktur]
- Jensen, Janus Møller (2007). Denmark and the Crusades, 1400-1650. Leiden-Boston: Brill. pp. 137–151. ISBN 978-90-474-1984-6.
- Mehring, Gebhard (1915). Kardinal Raimund Peraudi als Ablasskommissar in Deutschland 1500 - 1504 und sein Verhältnis zu Maximilian I.: Mit 9 Textbeilagen. Abdruck aus Forschungen u. Versuche zur Geschichte des Mittelalters u. der Neuzeit. Festschrift Dietrich Schäfer zum 70. Geburtstag dargebracht von seinen Schülern (in German). Jena: Gust. Fischer.
- Pastor, Ludwig von (1902). The History of the Popes, from the close of the Middle Ages, third edition, Volume V Saint Louis: B. Herder 1902.
- Paulus, Nikolaus (1900). "Raimund Peraudi als Ablasskommissar," Historisches Jahrbuch 21 (1900), pp. 645–682. (in German)
- Rapp, Francis (1994). "Un contemporain d'Alexandre VI Borgia, le cardinal Raymond Peraud (1434- 1505)." in: Académie des inscriptions et belles-lettres. Comptes-rendu des séances 3 (1994), pp. 665–677. (in French)
- Röpcke, Andreas (1992). "Geld und Gewissen. Raimund Peraudi und die Ablaßverkündung in Norddeutschland am Ausgang des Mittelalters', Bremisches Jahrbuch, 71 (1992), 43–80. (in German)
- Schneider, Johannes (1882). Die kirchliche und politische Wirksamkeit des Legaten Raimund Peraudi (1486-1505) (in German). Halle: Niemeyer.
