= Gaetano de Ruggiero =

Italian cardinal (1816–1896)

His Eminence Gaetano de Ruggiero
- Cardinal-Deacon of Santa Maria in Cosmedin
- Church: Roman Catholic Church
- Appointed: 27 May 1889
- Term ended: 9 October 1896
- Predecessor: Lorenzo Ilarione Randi
- Successor: Giuseppe Callegari
- Previous post: Secretary of the Fabric of Saint Peter (1885-89)

Orders
- Created cardinal: 24 May 1889 by Pope Leo XIII
- Rank: Cardinal-Deacon

Personal details
- Born: Gaetano de Ruggiero; 12 January 1816 Naples, Kingdom of Naples
- Died: 9 October 1896 (aged 80) Rome, Kingdom of Italy
- Buried: Campo Verano
- Education: University of Naples

Gaetano de Ruggiero (12 January 1816 – 9 October 1896) was an Italian prelate of the Catholic Church who worked in the Roman Curia and became a cardinal in 1889.

== Biography ==
Gaetano de Ruggiero was born in Naples on 12 January 1816. He studied at the University of Naples and later led the journal Liberta cattolica.

Beginning in 1847 he held positions in the Roman Curia.

Pope Leo XIII created him a cardinal deacon in the consistory of 24 May 1889; he received his red biretta and was assigned the deaconry of Santa Maria in Cosmedin 27 May 1889.

He became prefect of the Congregation for the Propagation of the Faith and president of the Chamber of Despoilments on 3 October 1889. Secretary of Apostolic Briefs on 25 June 1894. He was also grand chancellor of the Pontifical Equestrian Orders.

He died on 9 October 1896 after a long illness in Rome.
