= Salviati =

Salviati may refer to:

== People ==
- Salviati family of Florence
- Salviati (glassmakers) family, glass makers and mosaicists in 19th-century Venice
- Salviati (surname)

== Other ==
- Palazzo Salviati (Dorsoduro), a palace in Venice
- Palazzo Salviati (Rome), a palace in Rome
- Palazzo Salviati-Borghese, a palace in Florence
- Salviati Planisphere, an early world map which shows the Spanish view of the Earth drawn in 1525
