= Salviati family =

Florentine noble family

Salviati
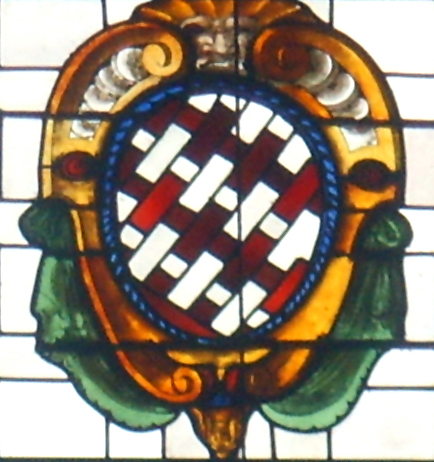
- Salviati coat of arms in a stained-glass window of the Salviati Chapel in San Marco, Florence
- Current region: Tuscany
- Members: Antonio Maria Salviati (1537–1602); Bernardo Salviati (1508–1568); Filippo Salviati (1582–1614); Francesco Salviati (died 1478); Giovanni Salviati (1490–1553); Gregorio Salviati (1722–1794); Jacopo Salviati (1461–1533); Maria Salviati (1499–1543)

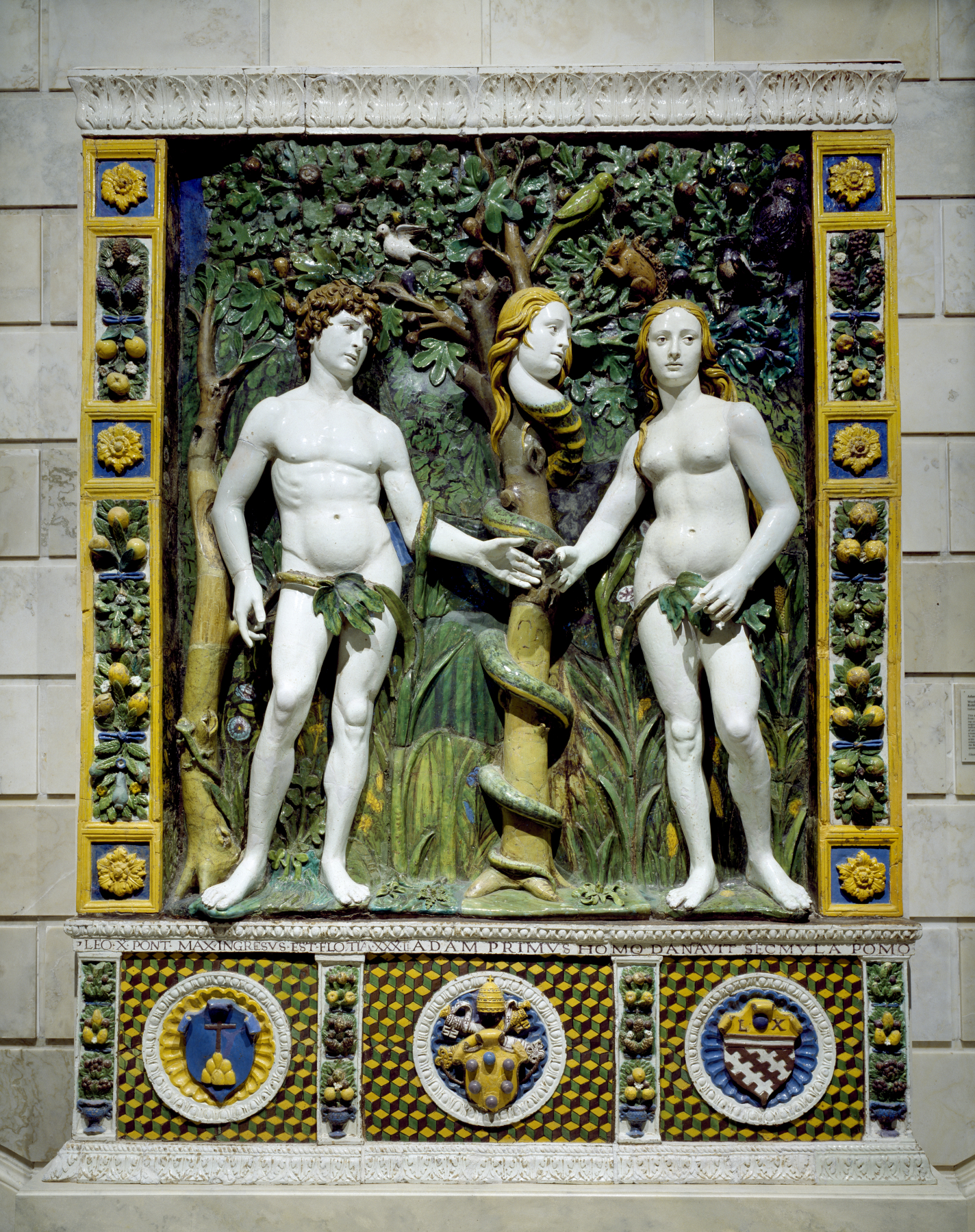
Adam and Eve, from the workshop of Giovanni della Robbia, with the Salviati arms at lower right (The Walters Art Museum)

The Salviati family was an important Italian noble family in the Republic of Florence.

== History ==
Some sources trace the origins of the family to a Gottifredo who lived in Florence in the twelfth century. The first documented member of the family is Cambio di Salvi, who in 1335 was among both the gonfalonieri and the priori. In all, twenty members were gonfaloniere and sixty-two occupied the position of priore.

== Members ==
- Francesco Salviati, archbishop of Pisa, hanged from the walls of the Palazzo della Signoria in 1478 for his part in the Pazzi Conspiracy
- Giorgio Benigno Salviati (died 1520), Bosnian-born adopted member of the family, theologian and archbishop
- Jacopo Salviati (1461–1533), married Lucrezia de' Medici
- Giovanni Salviati (1490–1553), cardinal
- Maria Salviati (1499–1543), daughter of Lucrezia di Medici and Jacopo Salviati, married Giovanni delle Bande Nere, mother of Cosimo I de Medici.
- Bernardo Salviati (1508–1568), condottiere, general of the galleys of the Order of St. John of Jerusalem and cardinal
- Cassandre Salviati, daughter of Bernardo Salviati, dedicatee of the Amours de Cassandre of Pierre de Ronsard
- Diane Salviati, niece of Cassandre, dedicatee of the L’hécatombe à Diane of Agrippa d'Aubigné
- Antonio Maria Salviati (1537–1602), appointed cardinal in 1583
- Alamanno Salviati, cardinal from 1727 until his death in 1733
- Gregorio Salviati, cardinal from 1777, died 1794
- Pietro Salviati, III Duke of Salviati (1887–1972), who in 1914 married in Palazzo Zilleri Maria Antoinetta Zilleri dal Verme, daughter of count Henri Zilleri dal Verme degli Obbizzi.
