= Saint-Germain-de-Marencennes =

- Part of Saint-Pierre-la-Noue
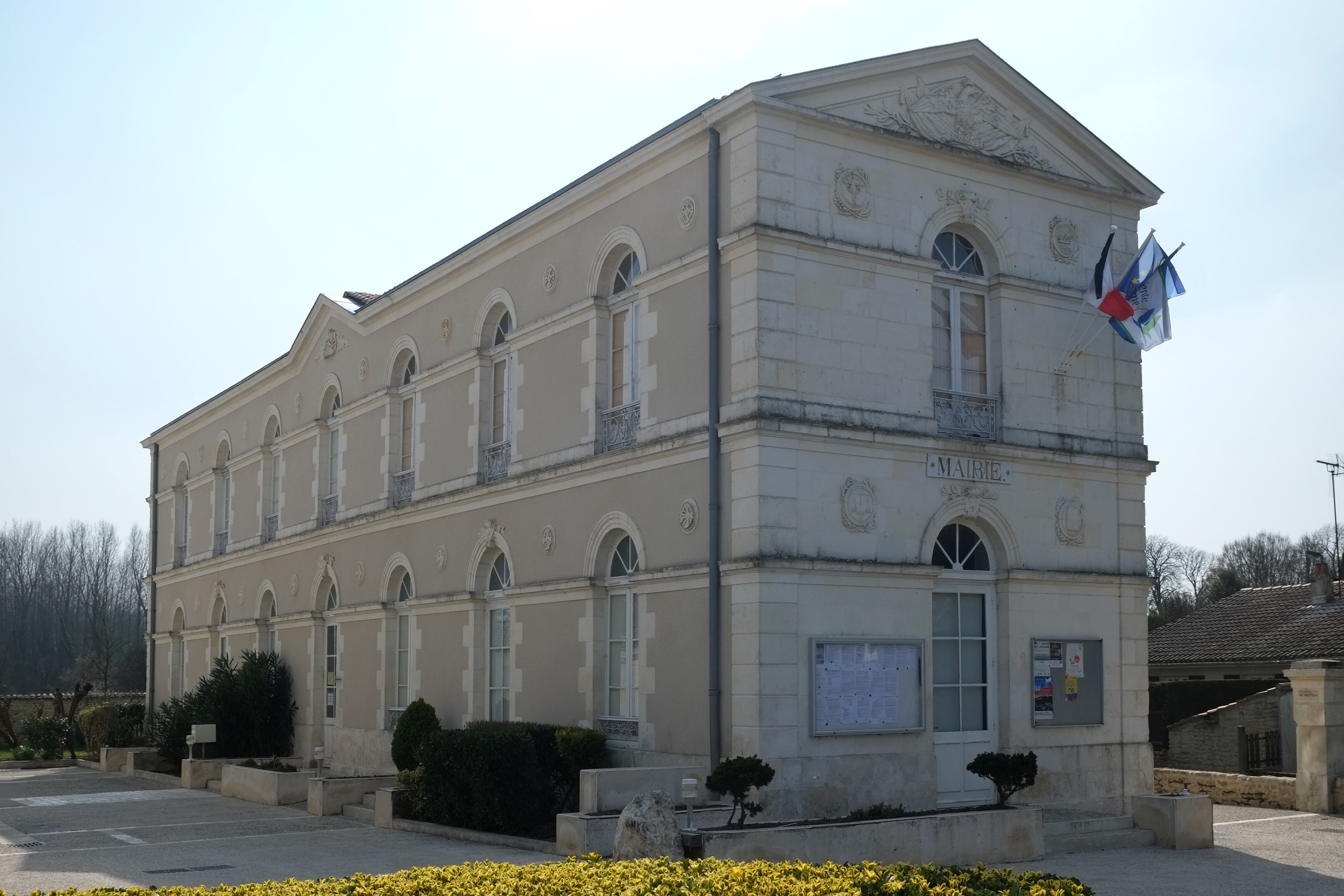
- Town hall
- Location of Saint-Germain-de-Marencennes
- Location within France Location within Nouvelle-Aquitaine
- Coordinates: 46°04′44″N 0°47′16″W
- Country: France
- Region: Nouvelle-Aquitaine
- Department: Charente-Maritime
- Arrondissement: Rochefort
- Canton: Surgères
- Commune: Saint-Pierre-la-Noue
- Area^{1}: 16.47 km^{2} (6.36 sq mi)
- Elevation: 15 m (49 ft)
- Highest elevation: 38 m (125 ft)
- Lowest elevation: 1 m (3.3 ft)
- Population (2022): 1,146
  - Density: 69.58/km^{2} (180.2/sq mi)
- Time zone: UTC+01:00 (CET)
  - Summer (DST): UTC+02:00 (CEST)
- Postal code: 17700
- ^{1} French Land Register data, which excludes lakes, ponds, glaciers > 1 km^{2} (0.386 sq mi or 247 acres) and river estuaries.

Saint-Germain-de-Marencennes (French pronunciation: [sɛ̃ ʒɛʁmɛ̃ də maʁɑ̃sɛn]) is a former commune in the Charente-Maritime department in southwestern France. On 1 January 2018, it was merged into the new commune of Saint-Pierre-la-Noue.

== Population ==
Historical population
| Year | Pop. | ±% p.a. |
|---|---|---|
| 1962 | 790 | — |
| 1968 | 806 | +0.33% |
| 1975 | 895 | +1.51% |
| 1982 | 974 | +1.22% |
| 1990 | 1,079 | +1.29% |
| 1999 | 1,038 | −0.43% |
| 2006 | 1,105 | +0.90% |
| 2022 | 1,146 | +0.23% |
Source: EHESS and INSEE (2022)

== See also ==
- Communes of the Charente-Maritime department
