= Stanisław Nagy =

His Eminence Stanisław Kazimierz Nagy SCJ
- Cardinal-Deacon of Santa Maria della Scala
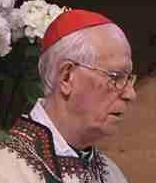
- Cardinal Nagy in 2005
- Church: Santa Maria della Scala
- See: Santa Maria della Scala
- Appointed: 21 October 2003
- Installed: 21 October 2003
- Term ended: 5 June 2013
- Predecessor: François-Xavier Nguyên Van Thuán
- Previous post: Titular Archbishop of Hólar (2003)

Orders
- Ordination: 8 July 1945 by Stanislaw Rospond
- Consecration: 13 October 2003 by Franciszek Macharski
- Created cardinal: 21 October 2003 by Pope John Paul II
- Rank: Cardinal-Deacon

Personal details
- Born: 30 September 1921 Bieruń Stary, Poland
- Died: 5 June 2013 (aged 91)
- Buried: St. John Paul II Center, Krakow, Poland
- Denomination: Roman Catholic
- Motto: in te cor Jesu speravi
- Coat of arms

Styles of Stanisław Nagy
- Reference style: His Eminence
- Spoken style: Your Eminence
- Informal style: Cardinal
- See: none

Stanisław Kazimierz Nagy, SCI (30 September 1921 – 5 June 2013) was a Polish member of the Priests of the Sacred Heart of Jesus (Dehonians) and a cardinal. He was born in 1921 in Bieruń, Silesia, Poland, to a Hungarian father and Polish mother. In 1937 he became a member of the Dehonian Congregation and was ordained a priest in 1945. He was a rector in Kraków-Płaszów, in Tarnów and a professor at the Catholic University of Lublin.

In the early 1970s Nagy served on the International Theological Commission, the Joint-Catholic-Lutheran Commission and on the editorial staff of the Catholic Encyclopedia. He attended Synods in 1981 and 1985 as well as writing books on ecumenism and Pope John Paul II. He was consecrated as Archbishop and was created Cardinal-Deacon of Santa Maria della Scala on 21 October 2003. Cardinal Nagy died on 5 June 2013 in Kraków, Poland.
