= Permesso di soggiorno =

Italian temporary residence permit

In Italy, the temporary residence permit (Italian: permesso di soggiorno, pl. permessi di soggiorno) is controlled by the Polizia di Stato, who are under the tutelage of the Ministry of the Interior. It must be requested by the immigrant to be allowed to reside in the country for more than eight days, or more than ninety days if having a travel visa for tourism. It is not required for European Union citizens.

Permessi are governed by the legislative decree 25 July 1998 n. 286 and the related implementation regulation pursuant to Presidential Decree no. 179 of 14 September 2011.

== Duration ==
A permesso must be requested within eight working days of the foreigner's entry into Italy. The duration of the residence permit is different depending on the reasons for the stay. A permesso can also have an unlimited duration in the case of a permit for domicile in Italy, obtainable by demonstrating that the applicant has a constant and sufficient source of income to be able to live comfortably in Italy, for example a pension or relevant real estate.

The limited duration is foreseen for the following types:

- reasons of subordinate employment, the duration is that of the relative employment contract (which from 2002, under the law of Bossi-Fini, takes the name of residence contract), with a maximum of two years, renewable until the foreigner retains that or another job (with a maximum of six months of unemployment status);
- reasons of seasonal work, the duration varies from twenty days to nine months (depending on the type of work performed);
- self-employment lasts two years;
- family reunification has a duration of two years if the family member to whom one rejoins has a two-year permit, otherwise the shorter duration of the permit of the family source of support;
- for study or training purposes may last up to one year.

== Obtention ==
According to Italian legislation, the permesso must be requested from the immigration office of the Italian province police headquarters where the foreigner resides. At the aforementioned office, the official complies with the requirement to take the applicant's fingerprints, performing the photo-fingerprint surveys required by law. The office also issues a copy of the request, which is stamped with an indication of the date and the day on which the residence permit can be withdrawn; up to this event, the regularity of the stay is attested by the receipt of the application, which must be shown to the Questura of residence when the document is collected.

The following types of residence permits can be presented at post offices:

- Residence permit for adoption;
- Residence permit for custody;
- Updating the Charter or residence permit;
- Residence permit for Waiting Occupation;
- Residence permit for Expected repurchase citizenship;
- Residence permit for political renewal;
- Residence card for foreigners;
- Conversion of residence permit;
- Duplicate card or residence permit;
- Residence permit for family reasons;
- Residence permit for self-employment;
- Residence permit for subordinate work;
- Residence permit for scientific research;
- Residence permit for study;
- Residence permit for business (Lavoro autonomo);
- Residence permit for professional training Internship;
- Residence permit for Tourism;
- Residence permit for Long Term Residents of the EU.

== Renewal ==
The expiring residence permit must be renewed, with a special request, at least 60 days before the expiry. The validity of the residence permit is the same as the entry visa, but it can be renewed. In any case, currently (after the Bossi-Fini law comes into force – 2002) the permit has a maximum duration of two years and is linked to the existence of an employment contract (so much so that it is also defined as a residence contract) or for self-employment. One-year or shorter permits can be issued for study, training, illness, pregnancy, unemployment, etc.

=== Motives for non-renewal ===
If the applicant has a criminal record, for certain crimes established by law and deemed particularly serious or related to the request of the permit itself (such as for example murders, drug or human trafficking), the permesso may not be renewed. Likewise if he loses his job or last studies for which the permit was issued (except for the possibility of issuing a short permit for unemployment and job search).
