= Jacopo Salviati =

Politician (1461–1533)

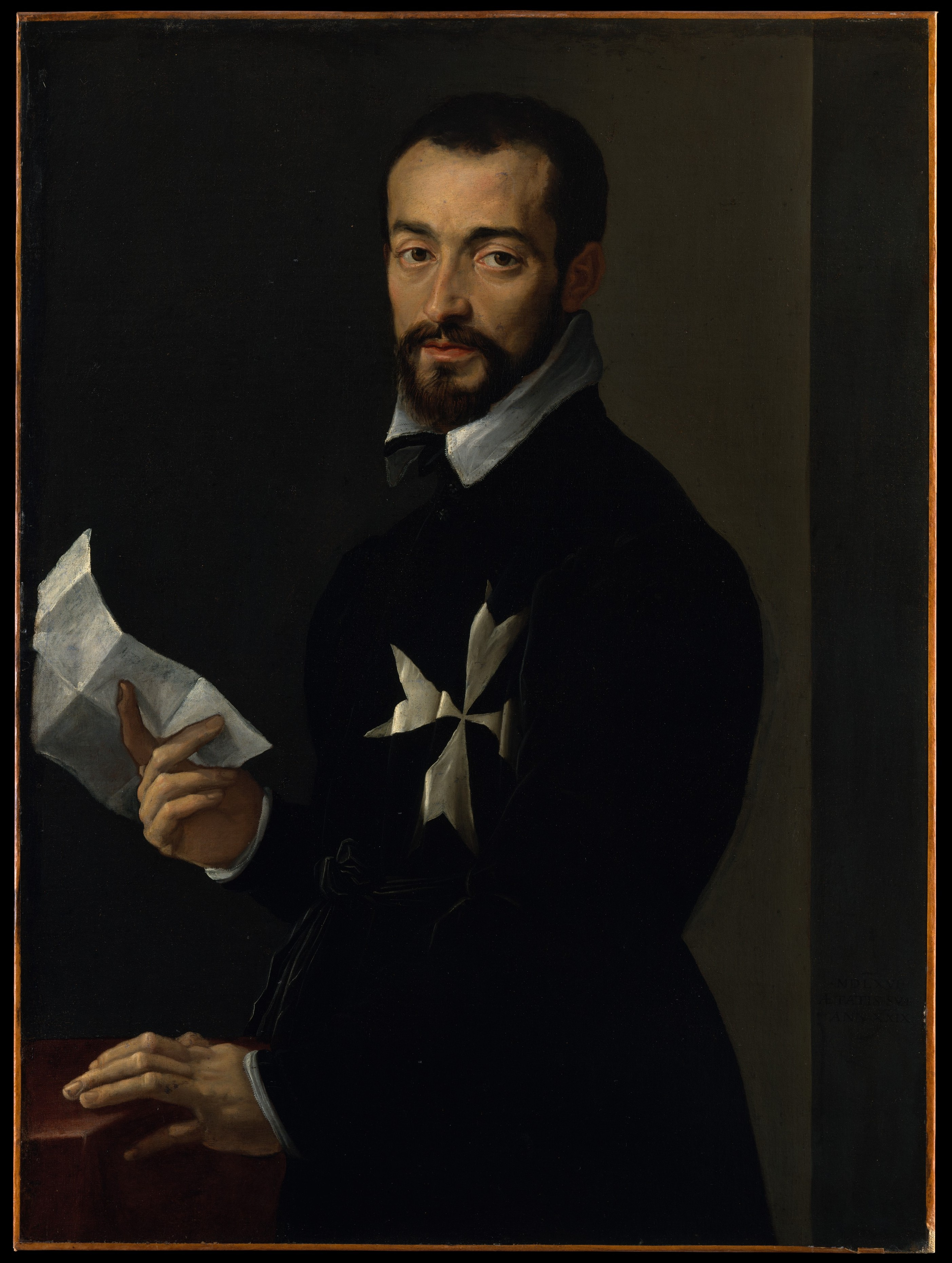
- Portrait of Jacopo Salviati, 1566
- Born: 15 September 1461; Florence, Florentine Republic
- Died: 6 September 1533 (aged 71)
- Noble family: Salviati
- Spouse: Lucrezia de' Medici
- Issue: Giovanni; Lorenzo; Piero; Elena; Caterina; Battista; Maria; Luisa; Francesca; Bernardo; Alamanno
- Father: Giovanni Salviati
- Mother: Maddalena Gondi

Jacopo Salviati (15 September 1461 – 6 September 1533) was a Florentine politician and son-in-law of Lorenzo de' Medici.

On 10 September 1486, he married Lorenzo's daughter Lucrezia de' Medici, with whom he had ten children. The son of Giovanni Salviati and Maddalena Gondi, he devoted himself to the economic affairs of the family, becoming very wealthy. He then engaged in political life. A sympathizer of Girolamo Savonarola, he signed the petition in his favour addressed to the pope in 1497. He was Prior of the Guilds of Florence in 1499 and 1518, then gonfaloniere of Justice in 1514. In 1513, he was appointed ambassador to Rome.

When his brother-in-law was elected as Pope Leo X, Jacopo benefited significantly. He was granted a salt monopoly in Romagna, and became a high officer in the Vatican treasury. He earned an income from these of 15,000 ducats each year.

He tried unsuccessfully to prevent the Siege of Florence (1529–1530), and was among the advisers of Pope Clement VII during his meeting with Charles V, Holy Roman Emperor.

In 1531, he was part of the balìa of 200 Florentine citizens charged with reforming the republican government.

He died on 6 September 1553.

== Issue ==
His marriage to Lucrezia produced eleven children, six sons and five daughters:

- Cardinal Giovanni Salviati (Florence, 1490 - Ravenna, 1553)
- Lorenzo Salviati (Florence, 1492 - Ferrara, 1539), senator and patron
  - Antonio Maria Salviati cardinal
- Piero Salviati, patrician
- Elena Salviati (Florence, 1495 circa - Genoa, 1552), married the Marquis Pallavicino Pallavicino and second marriage to the Prince Iacopo V Appiani in Appiano
- Caterina Salviati, married in 1511 Filippo Nerli, Florentine historical
- Battista Salviati (1498–1524)
- Maria Salviati (1499–1543), married to Giovanni dalle Bande Nere. This marriage reunited the main and Popolano branches of the Medici family. His son, Cosimo, was named to lead Florence after the death of Duke Alessandro de' Medici
- Luisa Salviati, married Sigismund de Luna and Peralta
- Francesca Salviati, married first to Piero Gualterotti (they had a daughter, Maria, who married Filippo Salviati) and second, in 1533, to Ottaviano de' Medici and had by him a son, Pope Leo XI
- Bernardo Salviati (1505/1508 - Rome, 1568), was a knight of the Order of St. John of Jerusalem, created a Cardinal in 1561
- Alamanno (1510–1571), patrician

== Sources ==
- Martines, Lauro. April Blood: Florence and the Plot against the Medici [Paperback], 328 pages, Oxford Univ. Press,(2004), also accessible through Kindle, Publisher: Vintage Digital (January 31, 2011).ISBN 978-1-4391-9389-1, (ebook). Also, ISBN 978-0-19-517609-4
- Simonetta, Marcello (2017). "Salviati, Jacopo". Dizionario Biografico degli Italiani (in Italian). Vol. 90: Salvestrini–Saviozzo da Siena. Rome: Istituto dell'Enciclopedia Italiana. ISBN 978-88-12-00032-6.
- Tomas, Natalie R. (2003). The Medici Women: Gender and Power in Renaissance Florence. Aldershot: Ashgate Publishing. p. 229. ISBN 0754607771.
- Unger, Miles J. Magnifico: The Brilliant Life and Violent Times of Lorenzo de' Medici, edit. (May 5, 2009). Simon&Schuster Paperbacks, New York. American Journalist resident for 5 years in Florence, Italy, ISBN 978-0-7432-5435-9
- Unger, Miles J. Machiavelli:A Biography, published June 14, 2011, accessible also through Kindle., 499 pages. ISBN 9781416556305
