= Arrondissement of Rochefort =

Coordinates: 45°56′N 0°58′W

Rochefort
- Arrondissement
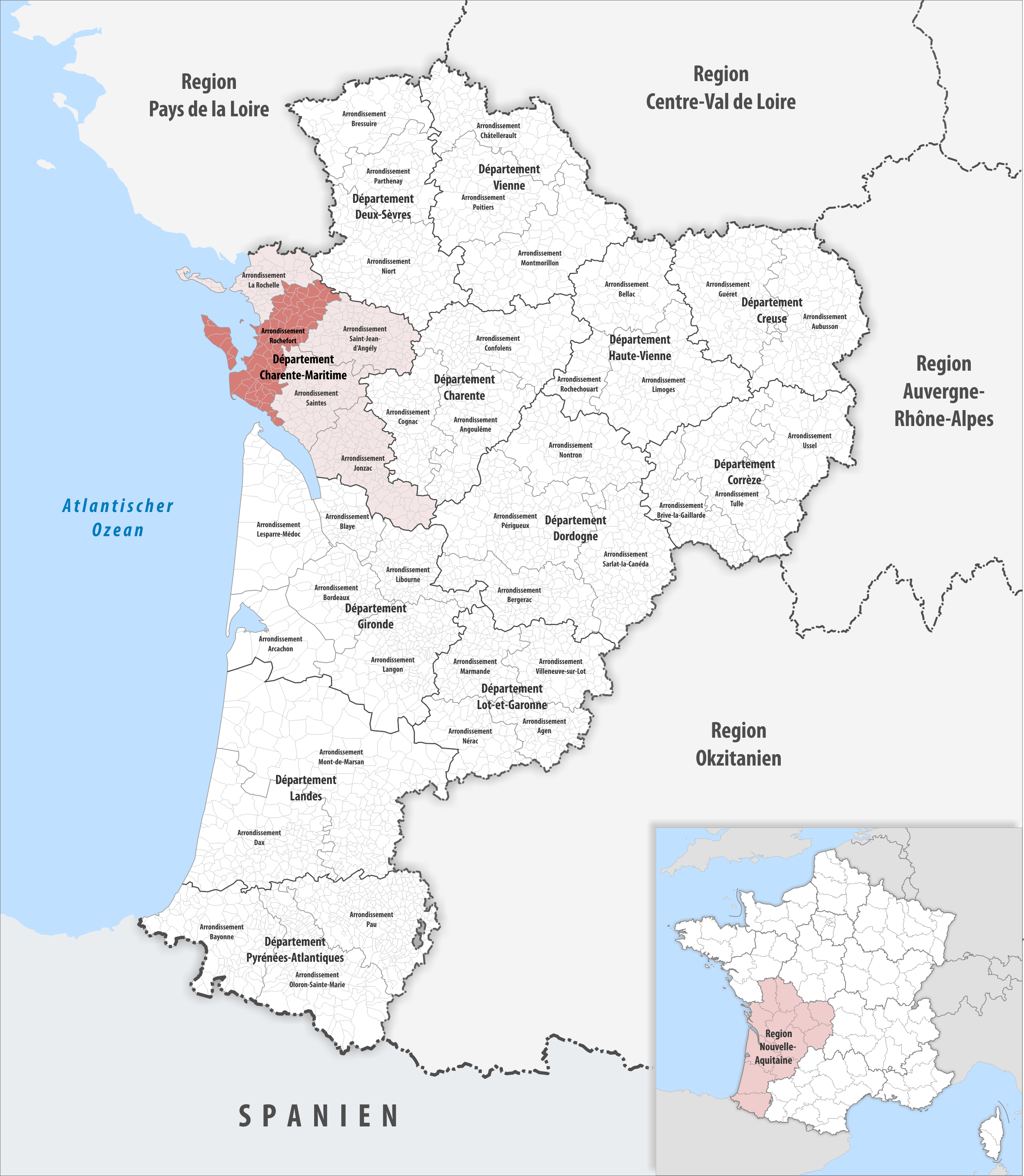
- Location within the region Nouvelle-Aquitaine
- Country: France
- Region: Nouvelle-Aquitaine
- Department: Charente-Maritime
- No. of communes: {{{nbcomm}}}
- Area: 1,534.6 km^{2} (592.5 sq mi)
- Population (2023): 197,040
  - Density: 128.40/km^{2} (332.55/sq mi)
- INSEE code: 172

The arrondissement of Rochefort (French: arrondissement de Rochefort) is an arrondissement (district) in the Charente-Maritime department in the region of Nouvelle-Aquitaine, France. It has 78 communes. Its population is 194,579 (2021), and its area is 1,534.6 km^{2} (592.5 sq mi).

== Composition ==
The communes of the arrondissement of Rochefort, and their INSEE codes, are:

1. Aigrefeuille-d'Aunis (17003)
2. Anais (17007)
3. Ardillières (17018)
4. Arvert (17021)
5. Ballon (17032)
6. Beaugeay (17036)
7. Bouhet (17057)
8. Bourcefranc-le-Chapus (17058)
9. La Brée-les-Bains (17486)
10. Breuil-la-Réorte (17063)
11. Breuillet (17064)
12. Breuil-Magné (17065)
13. Cabariot (17075)
14. Chaillevette (17079)
15. Chambon (17080)
16. Champagne (17083)
17. Le Château-d'Oléron (17093)
18. Ciré-d'Aunis (17107)
19. La Devise (17457)
20. Dolus-d'Oléron (17140)
21. Échillais (17146)
22. L'Éguille (17151)
23. Étaules (17155)
24. Forges (17166)
25. Fouras (17168)
26. Genouillé (17174)
27. Le Grand-Village-Plage (17485)
28. La Gripperie-Saint-Symphorien (17184)
29. Le Gua (17185)
30. Île-d'Aix (17004)
31. Landrais (17203)
32. Loire-les-Marais (17205)
33. Lussant (17216)
34. Marennes-Hiers-Brouage (17219)
35. Marsais (17221)
36. Les Mathes (17225)
37. Meschers-sur-Gironde (17230)
38. Moëze (17237)
39. Moragne (17246)
40. Mornac-sur-Seudre (17247)
41. Muron (17253)
42. Nieulle-sur-Seudre (17265)
43. Port-des-Barques (17484)
44. Puyravault (17293)
45. Rochefort (17299)
46. Royan (17306)
47. Saint-Agnant (17308)
48. Saint-Augustin (17311)
49. Saint-Coutant-le-Grand (17320)
50. Saint-Crépin (17321)
51. Saint-Denis-d'Oléron (17323)
52. Saint-Froult (17329)
53. Saint-Georges-de-Didonne (17333)
54. Saint-Georges-d'Oléron (17337)
55. Saint-Georges-du-Bois (17338)
56. Saint-Hippolyte (17346)
57. Saint-Jean-d'Angle (17348)
58. Saint-Just-Luzac (17351)
59. Saint-Laurent-de-la-Prée (17353)
60. Saint-Mard (17359)
61. Saint-Nazaire-sur-Charente (17375)
62. Saint-Palais-sur-Mer (17380)
63. Saint-Pierre-d'Amilly (17382)
64. Saint-Pierre-d'Oléron (17385)
65. Saint-Pierre-la-Noue (17340)
66. Saint-Saturnin-du-Bois (17394)
67. Saint-Sornin (17406)
68. Saint-Sulpice-de-Royan (17409)
69. Saint-Trojan-les-Bains (17411)
70. Soubise (17429)
71. Surgères (17434)
72. Le Thou (17447)
73. Tonnay-Charente (17449)
74. La Tremblade (17452)
75. Vaux-sur-Mer (17461)
76. Vergeroux (17463)
77. Virson (17480)
78. Vouhé (17482)

== History ==
The arrondissement of Rochefort was created in 1800. At the January 2017 reorganisation of the arrondissements of Charente-Maritime, it gained one commune from the arrondissement of La Rochelle, one commune from the arrondissement of Saintes and three communes from the arrondissement of Saint-Jean-d'Angély, and it lost two communes to the arrondissement of La Rochelle.

As a result of the reorganisation of the cantons of France which came into effect in 2015, the borders of the cantons are no longer related to the borders of the arrondissements. The cantons of the arrondissement of Rochefort were, as of January 2015:

1. Aigrefeuille-d'Aunis
2. Le Château-d'Oléron
3. Marennes
4. Rochefort-Centre
5. Rochefort-Nord
6. Rochefort-Sud
7. Royan-Est
8. Royan-Ouest
9. Saint-Agnant
10. Saint-Pierre-d'Oléron
11. Surgères
12. Tonnay-Charente
13. La Tremblade
