= Cabariot =

- Commune
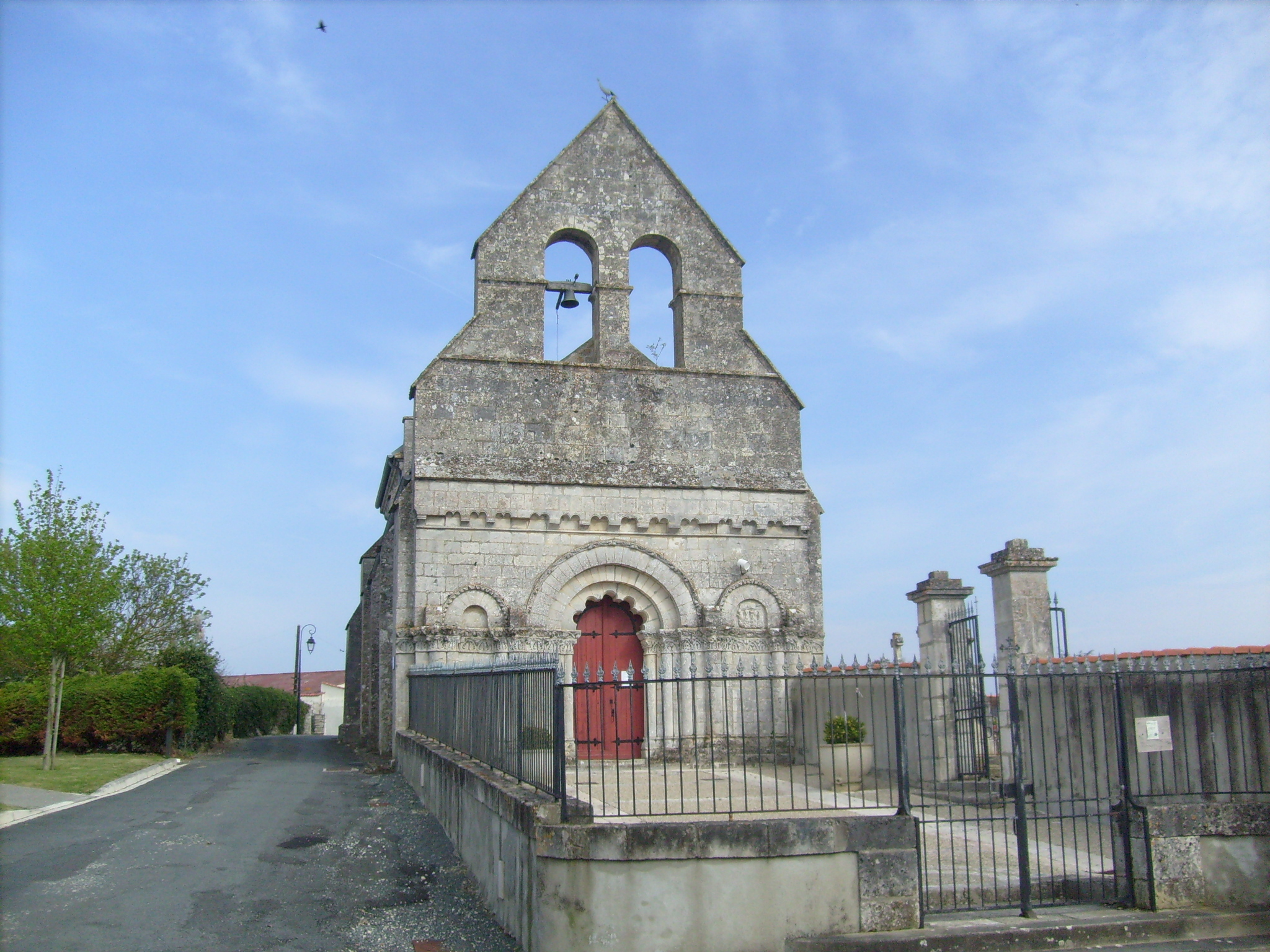
- The church in Cabariot
- Location of Cabariot
- Location within France Location within Nouvelle-Aquitaine
- Coordinates: 45°55′36″N 0°51′21″W
- Country: France
- Region: Nouvelle-Aquitaine
- Department: Charente-Maritime
- Arrondissement: Rochefort
- Canton: Tonnay-Charente
- Intercommunality: CA Rochefort Océan

Government
  - Mayor (2020–2026): Christian Branger
- Area^{1}: 15.12 km^{2} (5.84 sq mi)
- Highest elevation: 27 m (89 ft)
- Lowest elevation: 1 m (3.3 ft)
- Population (2023): 1,481
  - Density: 97.95/km^{2} (253.7/sq mi)
- Time zone: UTC+01:00 (CET)
  - Summer (DST): UTC+02:00 (CEST)
- INSEE/Postal code: 17075 /17430
- ^{1} French Land Register data, which excludes lakes, ponds, glaciers > 1 km^{2} (0.386 sq mi or 247 acres) and river estuaries.

Cabariot (French pronunciation: [kabaʁjo]) is a commune in the Charente-Maritime department in southwestern France.

== Geography ==
The river Boutonne forms part of the commune's southeastern border, then flows into the Charente, which forms all of its southwestern border.

== Population ==
Historical population
Year	Pop.	±% p.a.
1968	881	—
1975	921	+0.64%
1982	894	−0.42%
1990	1,087	+2.47%
1999	1,080	−0.07%
2007	1,193	+1.25%
2012	1,328	+2.17%
2017	1,341	+0.20%
2023	1,481	+1.67%
Source: INSEE

== See also ==
- Communes of the Charente-Maritime department
