= Genouillé =

Genouillé may refer to the following places in France:

- Genouillé, Charente-Maritime, a commune in the Charente-Maritime department
- Genouillé, Vienne, a commune in the Vienne department
