= Port-des-Barques =

- Commune
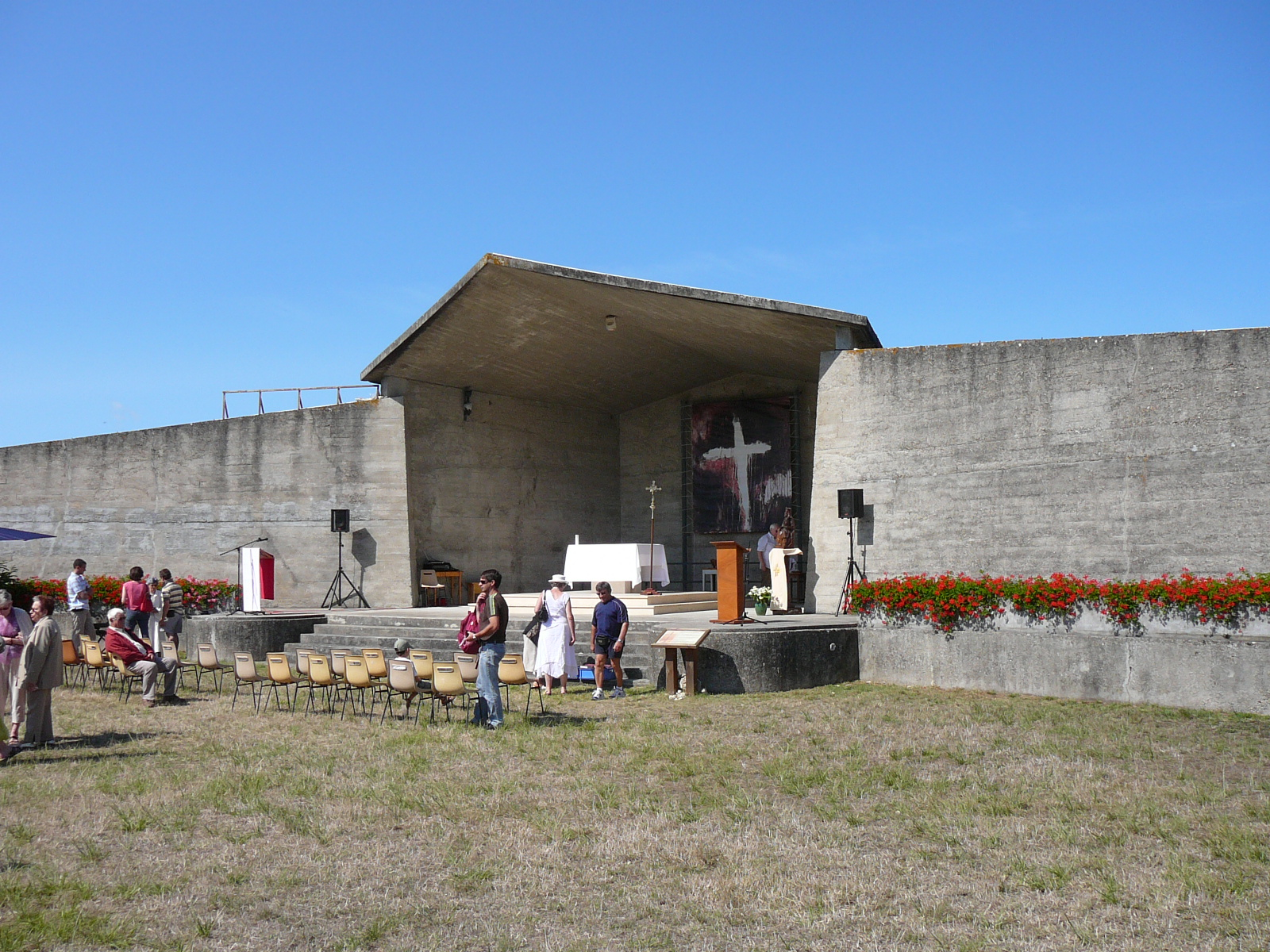
- Open-air chapel

- Coat of arms
- Location of Port-des-Barques
- Location within France Location within Nouvelle-Aquitaine
- Coordinates: 45°57′00″N 1°04′59″W
- Country: France
- Region: Nouvelle-Aquitaine
- Department: Charente-Maritime
- Arrondissement: Rochefort
- Canton: Tonnay-Charente
- Intercommunality: CA Rochefort Océan

Government
  - Mayor (2020–2026): Lydie Demené
- Area^{1}: 5.66 km^{2} (2.19 sq mi)
- Highest elevation: 10 m (33 ft)
- Lowest elevation: 0 m (0 ft)
- Population (2023): 1,780
  - Density: 314/km^{2} (815/sq mi)
- Demonym(s): Portbarquais, Portbarquaise (fr)
- Time zone: UTC+01:00 (CET)
  - Summer (DST): UTC+02:00 (CEST)
- INSEE/Postal code: 17484 /17730
- ^{1} French Land Register data, which excludes lakes, ponds, glaciers > 1 km^{2} (0.386 sq mi or 247 acres) and river estuaries.

Port-des-Barques (French pronunciation: [pɔʁ de baʁk]) is a commune in the department of Charente-Maritime, and the region of New Aquitaine, southwestern France. It was created in 1947 from part of Saint-Nazaire-sur-Charente.

== Population ==
Historical population
| Year | Pop. | ±% p.a. |
|---|---|---|
| 1968 | 1,181 | — |
| 1975 | 1,234 | +0.63% |
| 1982 | 1,330 | +1.08% |
| 1990 | 1,455 | +1.13% |
| 1999 | 1,534 | +0.59% |
| 2007 | 1,835 | +2.26% |
| 2012 | 1,903 | +0.73% |
| 2017 | 1,777 | −1.36% |
| 2023 | 1,780 | +0.03% |
Source: INSEE

== See also ==
- Communes of the Charente-Maritime department
