= Elias Neau =

British French-born Huguenot, religious educator

Elias Neau, Elie Naud
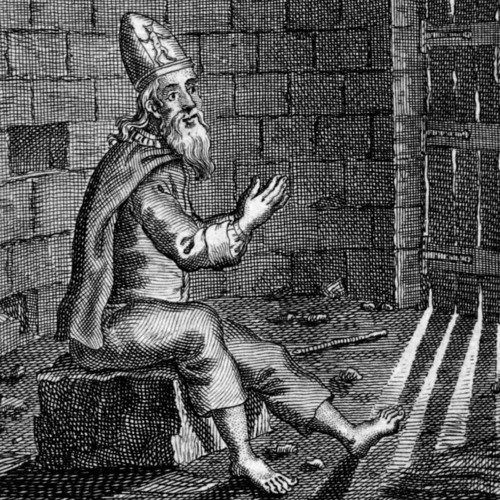
- Élie Neau in a Marseille prison, as illustrated in the 1749 edition of a book about his Protestant steadfastness.
- Born: Élie Neau; 1662; Moëze, Saintonge, France
- Died: 7 September 1722 (aged 59–60)
- Occupations: merchant, missionary

Elias Neau (1662 – 7 September 1722), born Élie Neau, in Moëze, Saintonge, was a French Huguenot. After the Revocation of the Edict of Nantes in 1685, he fled first to the French colony of Saint-Domingue, then to Boston, where he became a prosperous merchant. In 1692, he was captured by a French privateer near Jamaica, and for being a fugitive Protestant, was first sentenced to a life sentence as a galley slave, imprisoned in a castle dungeon in Marseille for two years, and then transferred to the Château d'If off the coast of Marseille for 50 days. He was released in 1697, following the intercession of King William III, whose ministers argued that Neau was an English subject.

Once back in North America, Neau's story made him "probably the most famous refugee in British America at the time" because his refusal to gain his freedom by converting to Catholicism attracted "a wide Protestant readership in both French and English."

In 1704, Neau cut his ties with the French Protestant church in New York and converted to Anglicanism. The Society for the Propagation of the Gospel then appointed him as minister to black slaves in North America, and he established the first school open to African-Americans in New York City. In 1706, he secured passage of a bill in New York allowing slaves to be catechized.
