= Breuil-Magné =

- Commune
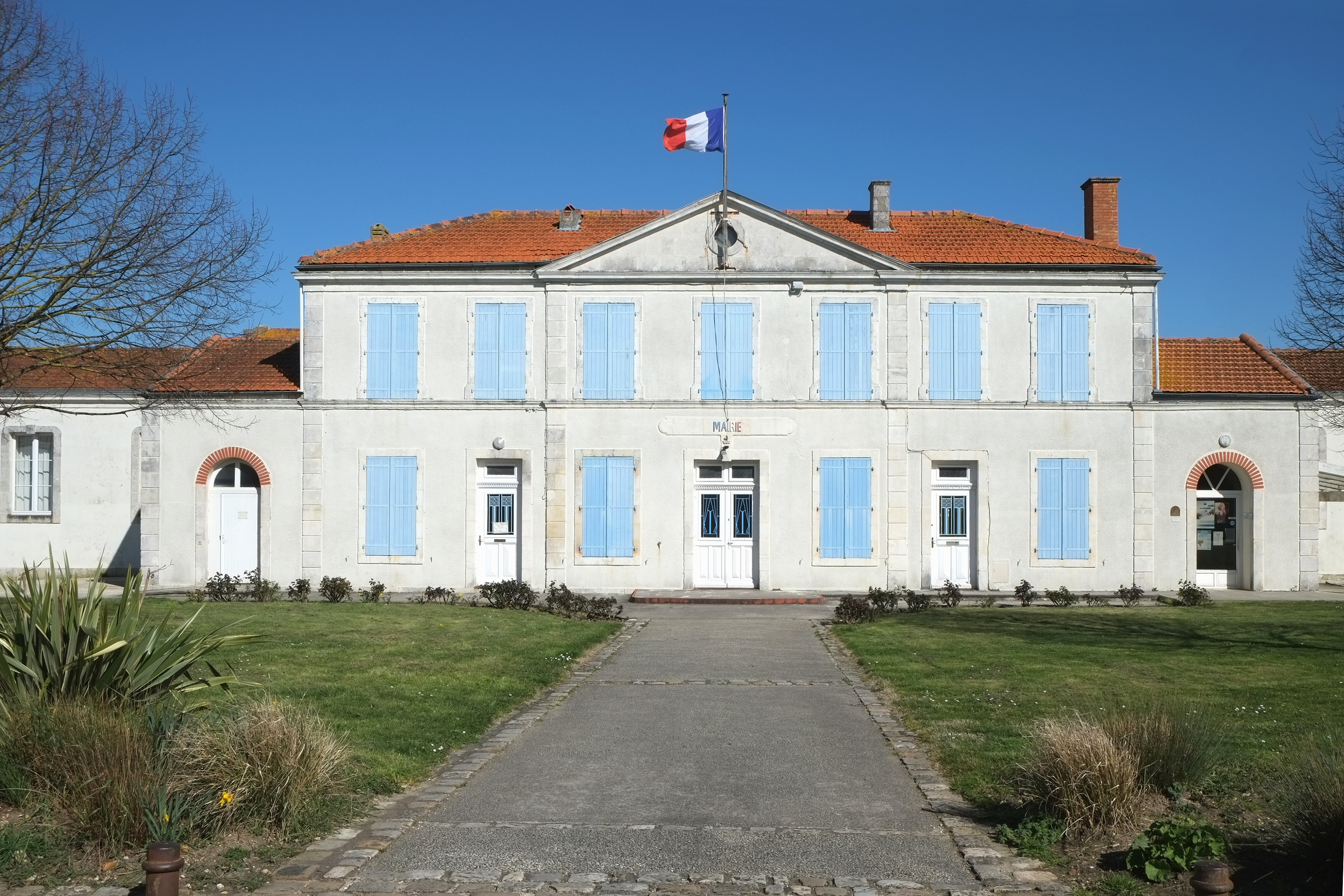
- The town hall in Breuil-Magné

- Coat of arms
- Location of Breuil-Magné
- Location within France Location within Nouvelle-Aquitaine
- Coordinates: 45°59′06″N 0°57′26″W
- Country: France
- Region: Nouvelle-Aquitaine
- Department: Charente-Maritime
- Arrondissement: Rochefort
- Canton: Tonnay-Charente
- Intercommunality: CA Rochefort Océan

Government
  - Mayor (2020–2026): Patricia François
- Area^{1}: 22.25 km^{2} (8.59 sq mi)
- Highest elevation: 30 m (98 ft)
- Lowest elevation: 0 m (0 ft)
- Population (2023): 1,926
  - Density: 86.56/km^{2} (224.2/sq mi)
- Time zone: UTC+01:00 (CET)
  - Summer (DST): UTC+02:00 (CEST)
- INSEE/Postal code: 17065 /17870
- ^{1} French Land Register data, which excludes lakes, ponds, glaciers > 1 km^{2} (0.386 sq mi or 247 acres) and river estuaries.

Breuil-Magné (French pronunciation: [bʁœj maɲe]) is a commune in the Charente-Maritime department in the Nouvelle-Aquitaine region in southwestern France.

== Population ==
Historical population
Year	Pop.	±% p.a.
1968	698	—
1975	972	+4.84%
1982	1,156	+2.51%
1990	1,160	+0.04%
1999	1,224	+0.60%
2007	1,494	+2.52%
2012	1,689	+2.48%
2017	1,685	−0.05%
2023	1,926	+2.25%
Source: INSEE

== See also ==
- Communes of the Charente-Maritime department
