= Loire-les-Marais =

- Commune
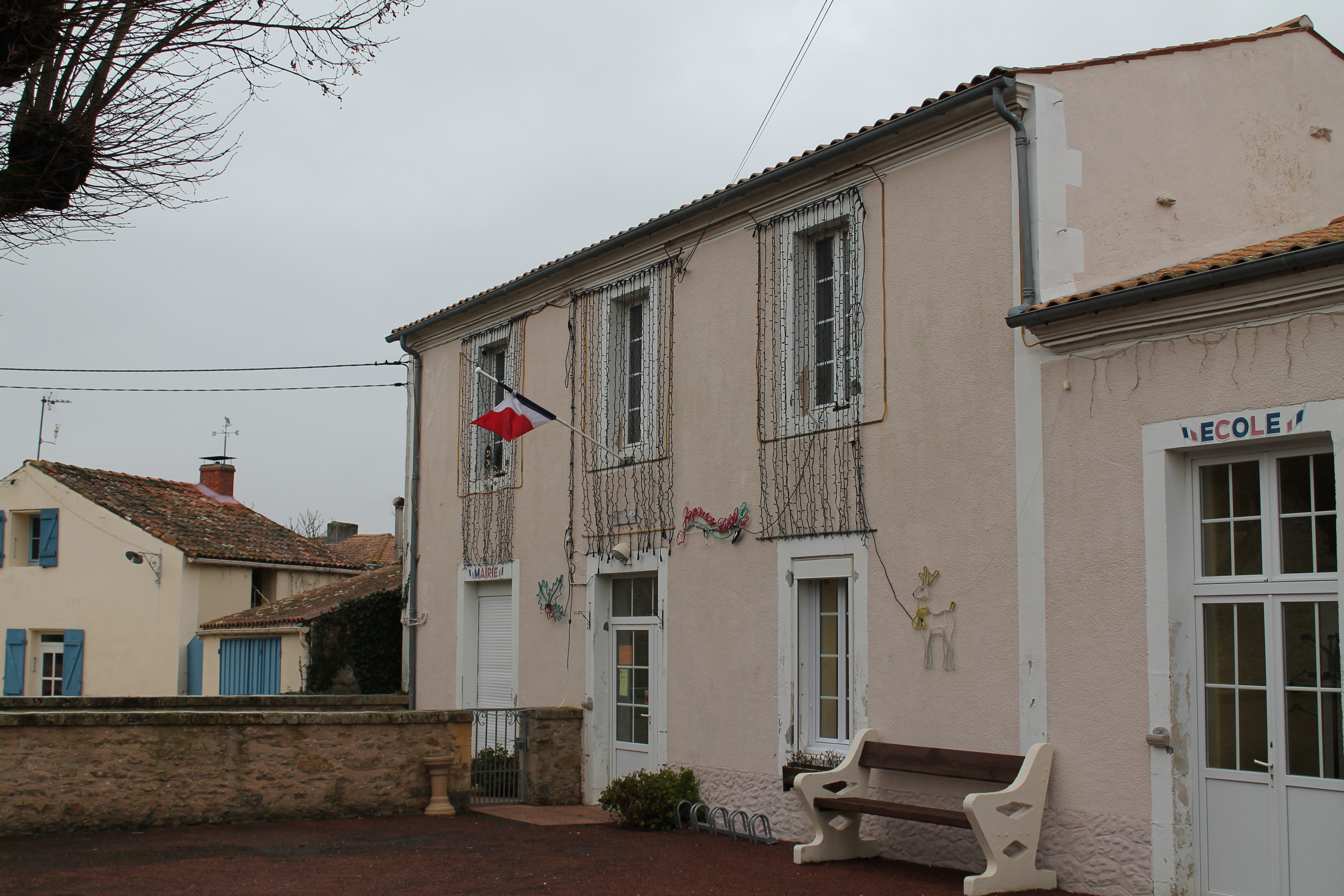
- The town hall and school in Loire-les-Marais
- Location of Loire-les-Marais
- Location within France Location within Nouvelle-Aquitaine
- Coordinates: 45°59′39″N 0°55′47″W
- Country: France
- Region: Nouvelle-Aquitaine
- Department: Charente-Maritime
- Arrondissement: Rochefort
- Canton: Tonnay-Charente
- Intercommunality: CA Rochefort Océan

Government
  - Mayor (2020–2026): Éric Recht
- Area^{1}: 12.46 km^{2} (4.81 sq mi)
- Highest elevation: 27 m (89 ft)
- Lowest elevation: 0 m (0 ft)
- Population (2023): 381
  - Density: 30.6/km^{2} (79.2/sq mi)
- Time zone: UTC+01:00 (CET)
  - Summer (DST): UTC+02:00 (CEST)
- INSEE/Postal code: 17205 /17870
- ^{1} French Land Register data, which excludes lakes, ponds, glaciers > 1 km^{2} (0.386 sq mi or 247 acres) and river estuaries.

Loire-les-Marais (French pronunciation: [lwaʁ le maʁɛ]) is a commune in the Charente-Maritime department in southwestern France.

== Population ==
Historical population
| Year | Pop. | ±% p.a. |
|---|---|---|
| 1968 | 172 | — |
| 1975 | 165 | −0.59% |
| 1982 | 268 | +7.17% |
| 1990 | 314 | +2.00% |
| 1999 | 326 | +0.42% |
| 2007 | 333 | +0.27% |
| 2012 | 345 | +0.71% |
| 2017 | 393 | +2.64% |
| 2023 | 381 | −0.52% |
Source: INSEE

== See also ==
- Communes of the Charente-Maritime department
