= Soubise, Charente-Maritime =

Soubise
- Commune
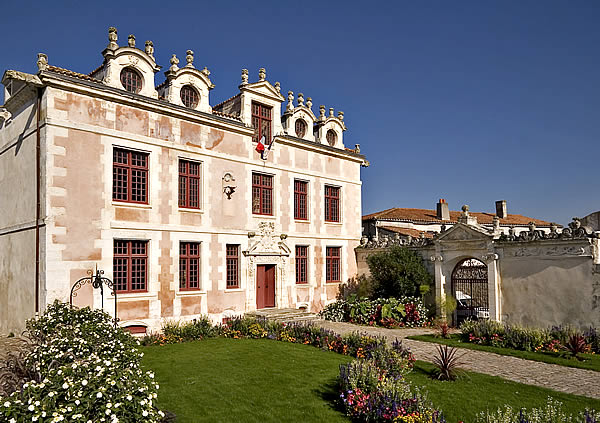
- Town hall

- Coat of arms
- Location of Soubise
- Location within France Location within Nouvelle-Aquitaine
- Coordinates: 45°55′34″N 1°00′28″W
- Country: France
- Region: Nouvelle-Aquitaine
- Department: Charente-Maritime
- Arrondissement: Rochefort
- Canton: Tonnay-Charente
- Intercommunality: CA Rochefort Océan

Government
  - Mayor (2020–2026): Lionel Pacaud
- Area^{1}: 10.93 km^{2} (4.22 sq mi)
- Highest elevation: 22 m (72 ft)
- Lowest elevation: 0 m (0 ft)
- Population (2023): 3,316
  - Density: 303.4/km^{2} (785.8/sq mi)
- Time zone: UTC+01:00 (CET)
  - Summer (DST): UTC+02:00 (CEST)
- INSEE/Postal code: 17429 /17780
- ^{1} French Land Register data, which excludes lakes, ponds, glaciers > 1 km^{2} (0.386 sq mi or 247 acres) and river estuaries.

Soubise (French pronunciation: [subiz]) is a commune in the Charente-Maritime department in southwestern France.

It is situated on the left bank of the river Charente opposite Rochefort and is a former shipbuilding centre.

== Population ==
Historical population
Year	Pop.	±% p.a.
1968	730	—
1975	842	+2.06%
1982	1,422	+7.77%
1990	1,220	−1.90%
1999	1,220	+0.00%
2007	2,824	+11.06%
2012	2,904	+0.56%
2017	2,998	+0.64%
2023	3,316	+1.69%
Source: INSEE

== See also ==
- Prince of Soubise
- Princess of Soubise
- Communes of the Charente-Maritime department
