= Saint-Coutant-le-Grand =

- Commune
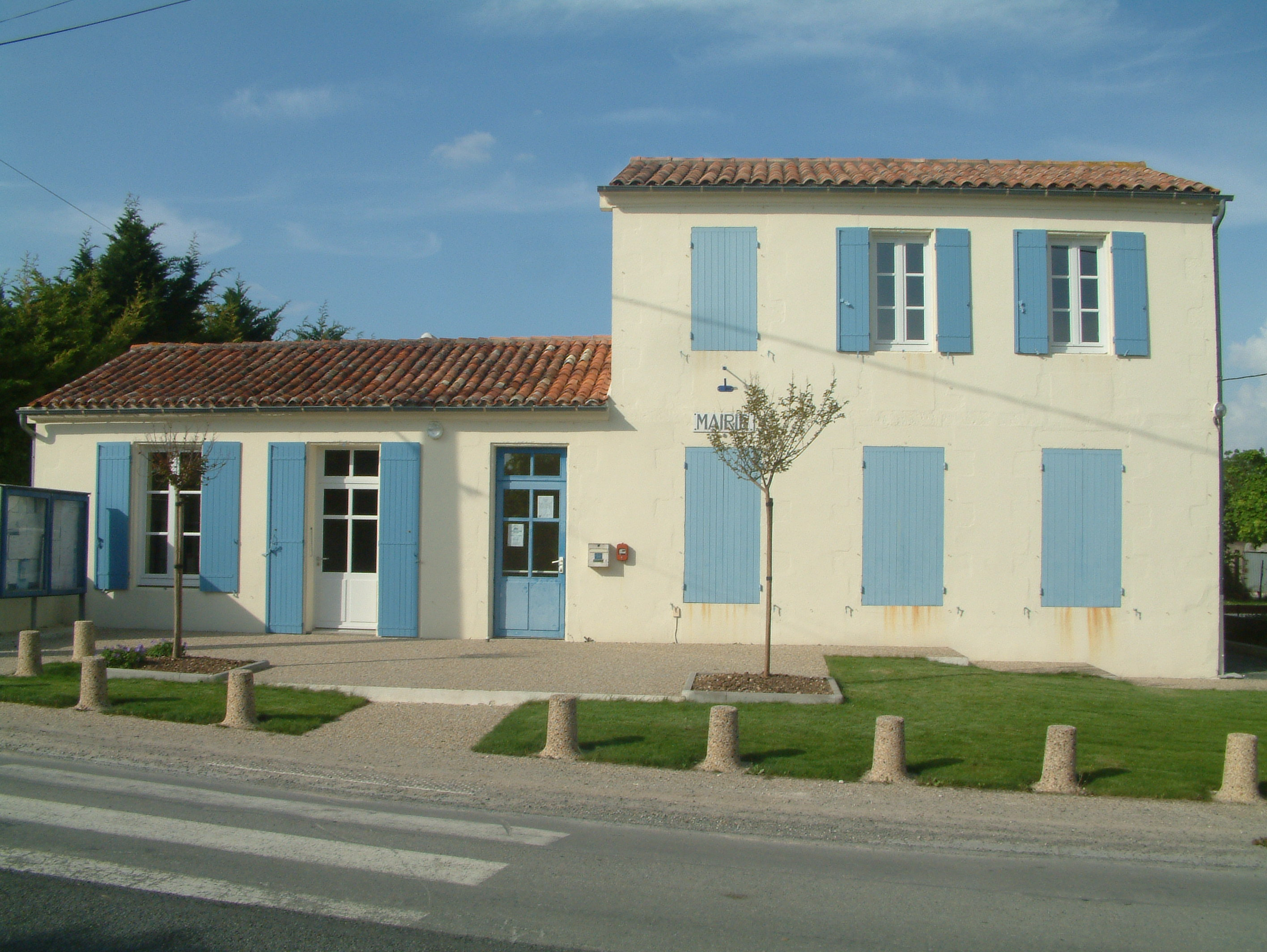
- Town hall

- Coat of arms
- Location of Saint-Coutant-le-Grand
- Location within France Location within Nouvelle-Aquitaine
- Coordinates: 45°57′15″N 0°46′03″W
- Country: France
- Region: Nouvelle-Aquitaine
- Department: Charente-Maritime
- Arrondissement: Rochefort
- Canton: Tonnay-Charente
- Intercommunality: CA Rochefort Océan

Government
  - Mayor (2020–2026): Patricia Tabuteau
- Area^{1}: 12.8 km^{2} (4.9 sq mi)
- Elevation: 18 m (59 ft)
- Highest elevation: 45 m (148 ft)
- Lowest elevation: 1 m (3.3 ft)
- Population (2023): 417
  - Density: 32.6/km^{2} (84.4/sq mi)
- Time zone: UTC+01:00 (CET)
  - Summer (DST): UTC+02:00 (CEST)
- INSEE/Postal code: 17320 /17430
- ^{1} French Land Register data, which excludes lakes, ponds, glaciers > 1 km^{2} (0.386 sq mi or 247 acres) and river estuaries.

Saint-Coutant-le-Grand (French pronunciation: [sɛ̃ kutɑ̃ lə ɡʁɑ̃]) is a commune in the Charente-Maritime department in southwestern France.

== Geography ==
The river Boutonne forms part of the commune's southern border.

== Population ==
Historical population
Year	Pop.	±% p.a.
1968	337	—
1975	338	+0.04%
1982	306	−1.41%
1990	293	−0.54%
1999	279	−0.54%
2007	315	+1.53%
2012	411	+5.46%
2017	421	+0.48%
2023	417	−0.16%
Source: INSEE

== See also ==
- Communes of the Charente-Maritime department
