= Moragne =

- Commune
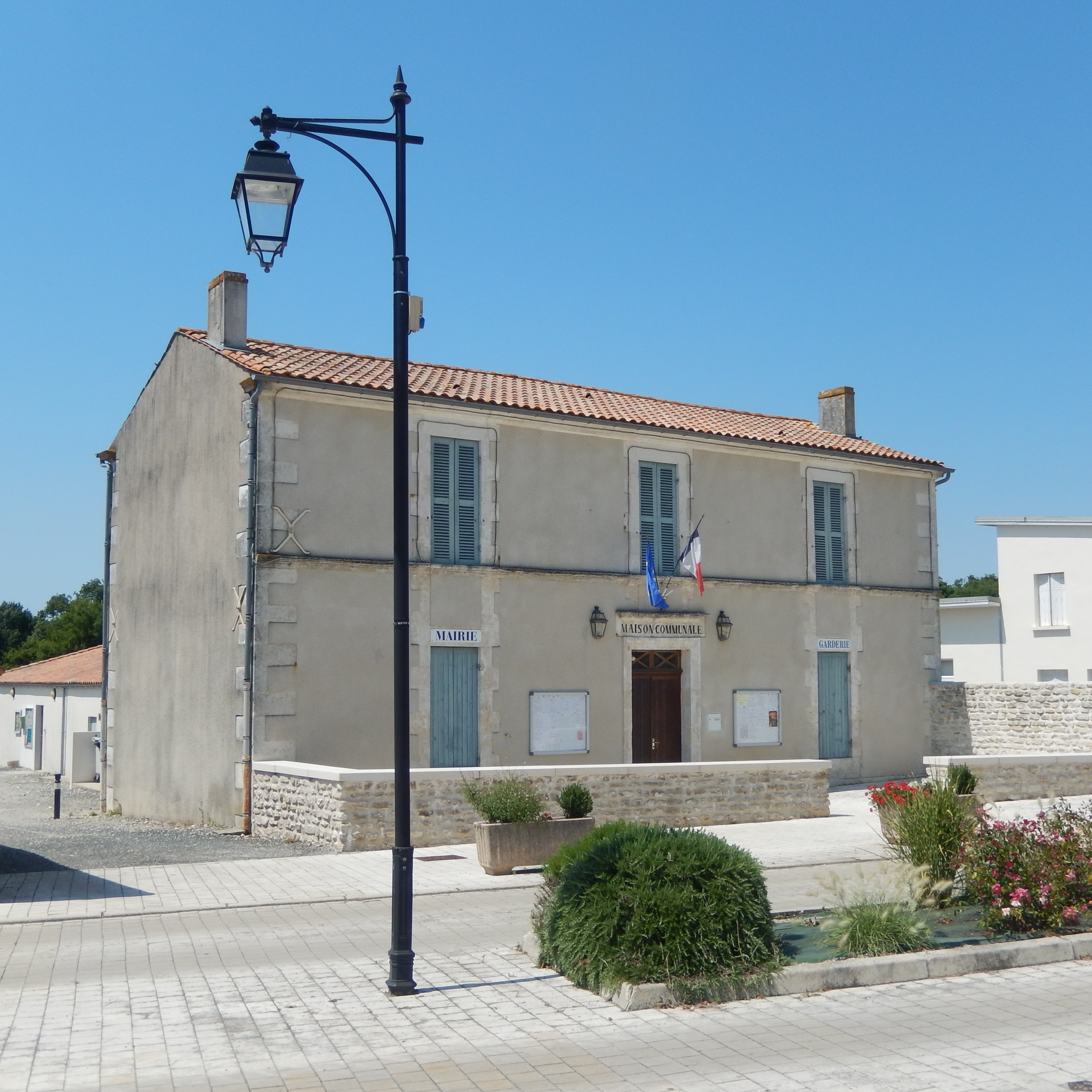
- The town hall in Moragne
- Location of Moragne
- Location within France Location within Nouvelle-Aquitaine
- Coordinates: 45°58′22″N 0°48′09″W
- Country: France
- Region: Nouvelle-Aquitaine
- Department: Charente-Maritime
- Arrondissement: Rochefort
- Canton: Tonnay-Charente
- Intercommunality: CA Rochefort Océan

Government
  - Mayor (2020–2026): Bruno Bessaguet
- Area^{1}: 12.03 km^{2} (4.64 sq mi)
- Highest elevation: 63 m (207 ft)
- Lowest elevation: 1 m (3.3 ft)
- Population (2023): 536
  - Density: 44.6/km^{2} (115/sq mi)
- Time zone: UTC+01:00 (CET)
  - Summer (DST): UTC+02:00 (CEST)
- INSEE/Postal code: 17246 /17430
- ^{1} French Land Register data, which excludes lakes, ponds, glaciers > 1 km^{2} (0.386 sq mi or 247 acres) and river estuaries.

Moragne (French pronunciation: [mɔʁaɲ]) is a commune in the Charente-Maritime department in southwestern France.

== Population ==
Historical population
Year	Pop.	±% p.a.
1968	285	—
1975	275	−0.51%
1982	318	+2.10%
1990	394	+2.71%
1999	401	+0.20%
2007	448	+1.40%
2012	479	+1.35%
2017	507	+1.14%
2023	536	+0.93%
Source: INSEE

== See also ==
- Communes of the Charente-Maritime department
