= Muron =

- Commune
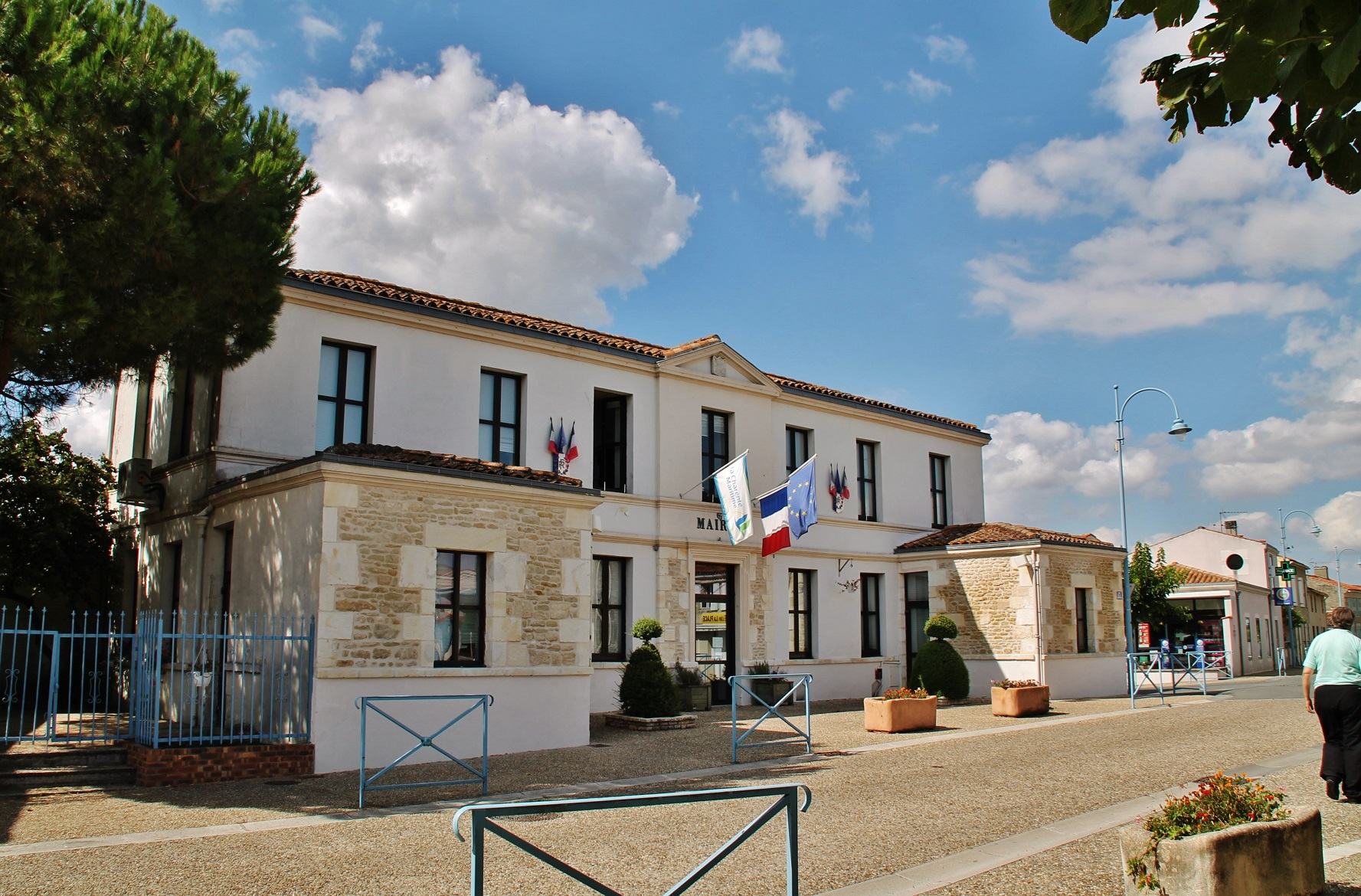
- The town hall in Muron

- Coat of arms
- Location of Muron
- Location within France Location within Nouvelle-Aquitaine
- Coordinates: 46°02′09″N 0°49′43″W
- Country: France
- Region: Nouvelle-Aquitaine
- Department: Charente-Maritime
- Arrondissement: Rochefort
- Canton: Tonnay-Charente
- Intercommunality: CA Rochefort Océan

Government
  - Mayor (2020–2026): Angélique Lerouge
- Area^{1}: 39.06 km^{2} (15.08 sq mi)
- Highest elevation: 28 m (92 ft)
- Lowest elevation: 0 m (0 ft)
- Population (2023): 1,378
  - Density: 35.28/km^{2} (91.37/sq mi)
- Time zone: UTC+01:00 (CET)
  - Summer (DST): UTC+02:00 (CEST)
- INSEE/Postal code: 17253 /17430
- ^{1} French Land Register data, which excludes lakes, ponds, glaciers > 1 km^{2} (0.386 sq mi or 247 acres) and river estuaries.

Muron (French pronunciation: [myʁɔ̃]) is a commune in the Charente-Maritime department in southwestern France.

== Population ==
Historical population
Year	Pop.	±% p.a.
1968	719	—
1975	754	+0.68%
1982	947	+3.31%
1990	1,017	+0.90%
1999	996	−0.23%
2007	1,207	+2.43%
2012	1,257	+0.82%
2017	1,344	+1.35%
2023	1,378	+0.42%
Source: INSEE

== See also ==
- Communes of the Charente-Maritime department
