= Saint-Laurent-de-la-Prée =

- Commune
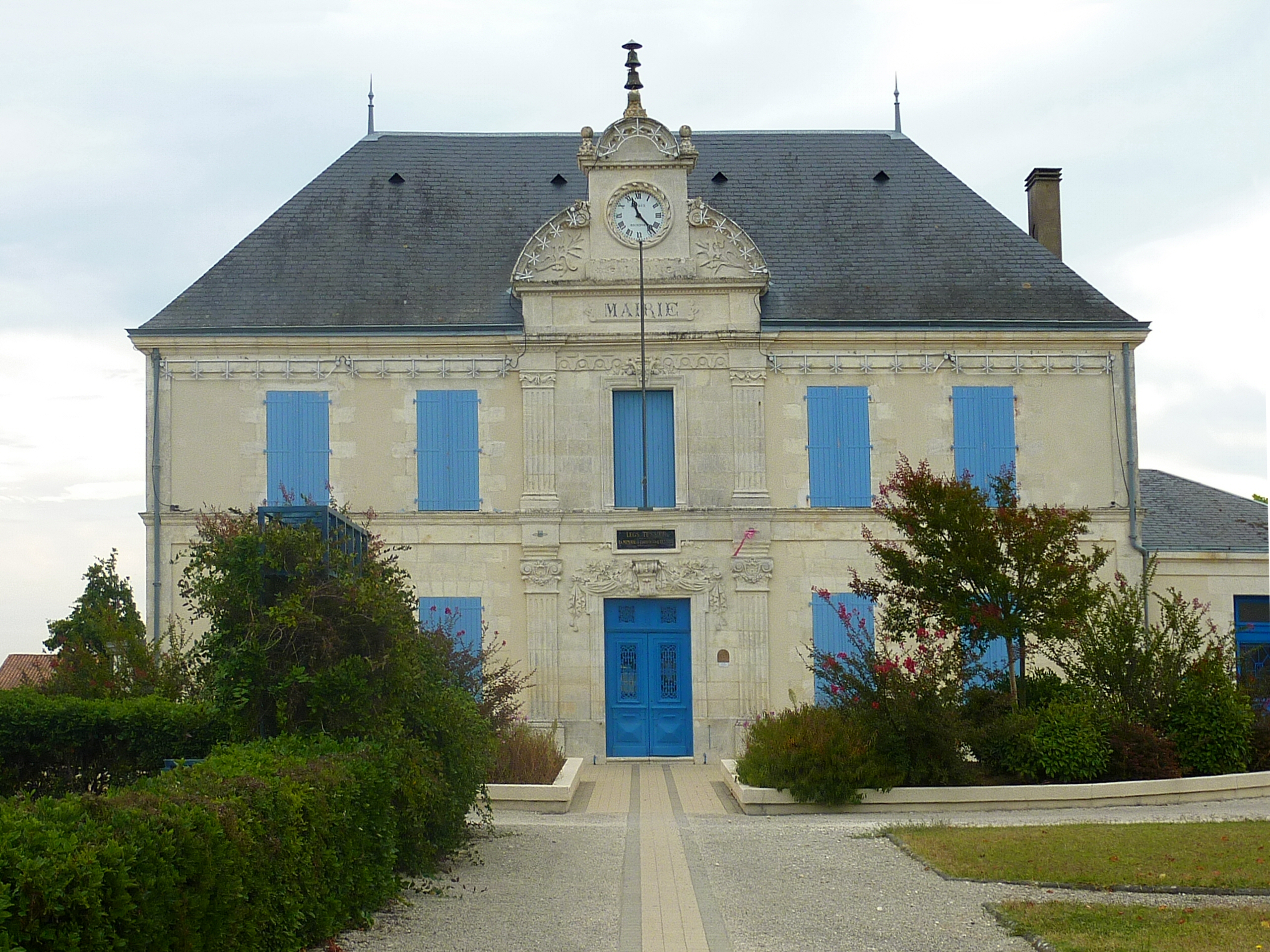
- The town hall in Saint-Laurent-de-la-Prée
- Location of Saint-Laurent-de-la-Prée
- Location within France Location within Nouvelle-Aquitaine
- Coordinates: 45°58′55″N 1°02′24″W
- Country: France
- Region: Nouvelle-Aquitaine
- Department: Charente-Maritime
- Arrondissement: Rochefort
- Canton: Châtelaillon-Plage
- Intercommunality: CA Rochefort Océan

Government
  - Mayor (2020–2026): Olivier Coche-Dequeant
- Area^{1}: 27.51 km^{2} (10.62 sq mi)
- Elevation: 7 m (23 ft)
- Highest elevation: 23 m (75 ft)
- Lowest elevation: 0 m (0 ft)
- Population (2023): 2,299
  - Density: 83.57/km^{2} (216.4/sq mi)
- Time zone: UTC+01:00 (CET)
  - Summer (DST): UTC+02:00 (CEST)
- INSEE/Postal code: 17353 /17450
- ^{1} French Land Register data, which excludes lakes, ponds, glaciers > 1 km^{2} (0.386 sq mi or 247 acres) and river estuaries.

Saint-Laurent-de-la-Prée (pronounced [sɛ̃ lɔʁɑ̃ də la pʁe]) is a French commune and town in the Charente-Maritime department, administrative region of Nouvelle-Aquitaine.

== Population ==
Historical population
Year	Pop.	±% p.a.
1968	857	—
1975	848	−0.15%
1982	1,075	+3.45%
1990	1,256	+1.96%
1999	1,347	+0.78%
2007	1,725	+3.14%
2012	1,936	+2.33%
2017	2,114	+1.77%
2023	2,299	+1.41%
Source: INSEE

== See also ==
- Communes of the Charente-Maritime department
