= Champagne, Charente-Maritime =

Champagne
- Commune
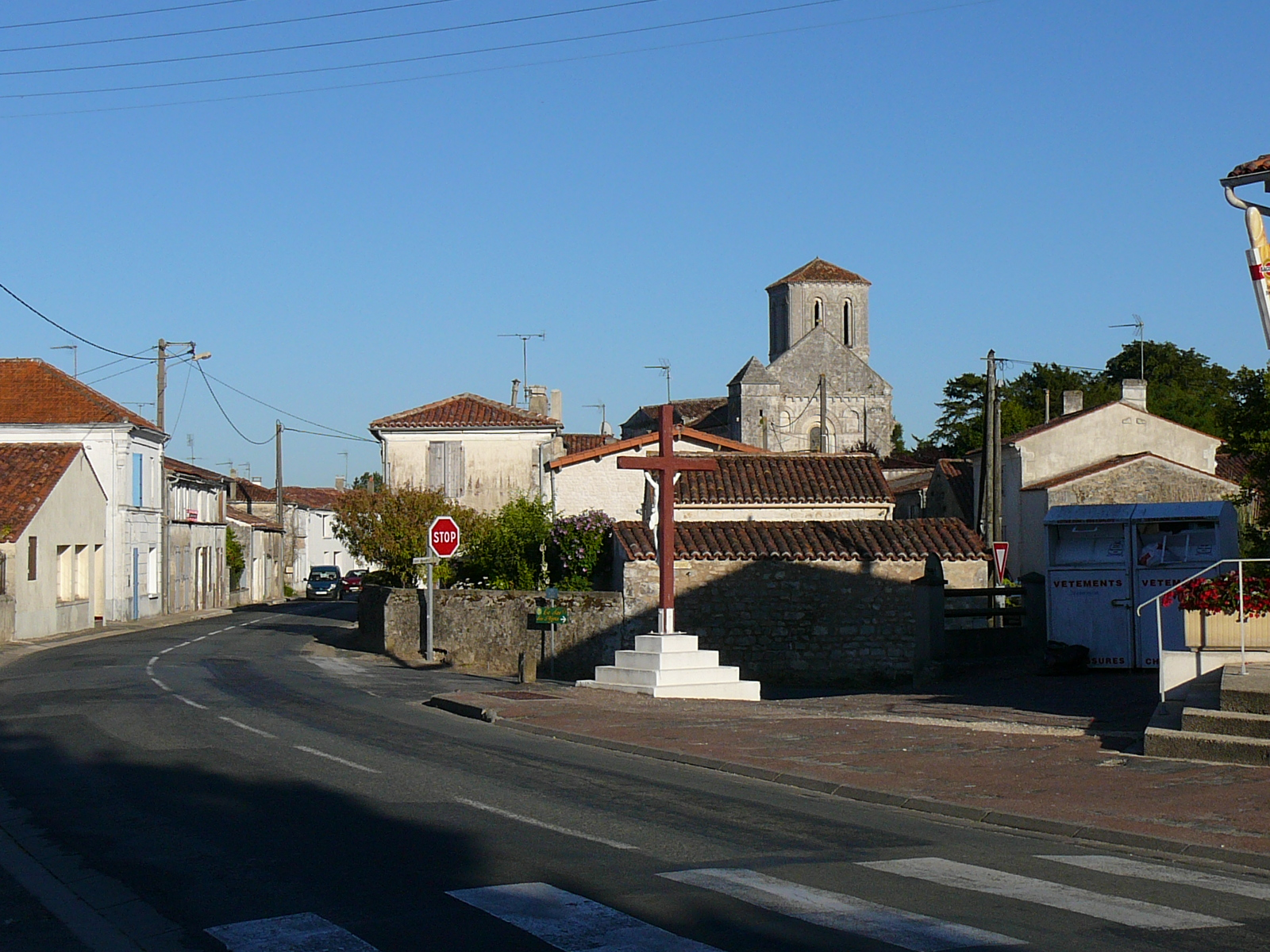
- A general view of Champagne
- Location of Champagne
- Location within France Location within Nouvelle-Aquitaine
- Coordinates: 45°49′55″N 0°54′24″W
- Country: France
- Region: Nouvelle-Aquitaine
- Department: Charente-Maritime
- Arrondissement: Rochefort
- Canton: Marennes
- Intercommunality: CA Rochefort Océan

Government
  - Mayor (2020–2026): Roland Clochard
- Area^{1}: 19.53 km^{2} (7.54 sq mi)
- Highest elevation: 40 m (130 ft)
- Lowest elevation: 1 m (3.3 ft)
- Population (2023): 651
  - Density: 33.3/km^{2} (86.3/sq mi)
- Time zone: UTC+01:00 (CET)
  - Summer (DST): UTC+02:00 (CEST)
- INSEE/Postal code: 17083 /17620
- ^{1} French Land Register data, which excludes lakes, ponds, glaciers > 1 km^{2} (0.386 sq mi or 247 acres) and river estuaries.

Champagne (French pronunciation: [ʃɑ̃paɲ]) is a commune in the Charente-Maritime department in southwestern France.

== Population ==
Historical population
Year	Pop.	±% p.a.
1968	514	—
1975	454	−1.76%
1982	448	−0.19%
1990	482	+0.92%
1999	530	+1.06%
2007	606	+1.69%
2012	628	+0.72%
2017	611	−0.55%
2023	651	+1.06%
Source: INSEE

== See also ==
- The Campanian Age of the Cretaceous Period of geological time is named for the commune of Champagne
- Communes of the Charente-Maritime department
