= Nieulle-sur-Seudre =

- Commune
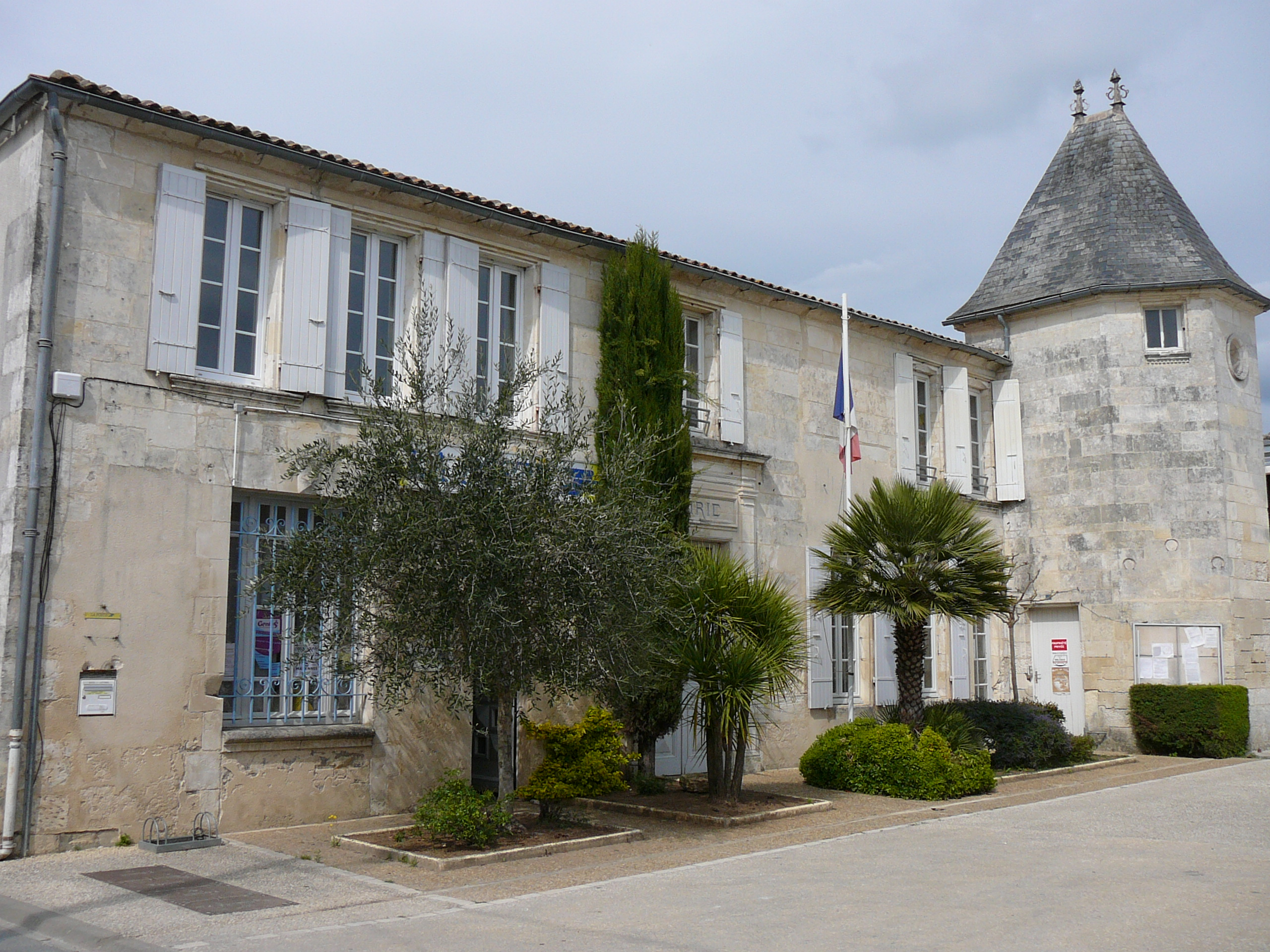
- Town hall
- Location of Nieulle-sur-Seudre
- Location within France Location within Nouvelle-Aquitaine
- Coordinates: 45°45′02″N 0°59′55″W
- Country: France
- Region: Nouvelle-Aquitaine
- Department: Charente-Maritime
- Arrondissement: Rochefort
- Canton: Marennes

Government
  - Mayor (2020–2026): François Servent
- Area^{1}: 20.75 km^{2} (8.01 sq mi)
- Highest elevation: 9 m (30 ft)
- Lowest elevation: 0 m (0 ft)
- Population (2023): 1,220
  - Density: 58.8/km^{2} (152/sq mi)
- Time zone: UTC+01:00 (CET)
  - Summer (DST): UTC+02:00 (CEST)
- INSEE/Postal code: 17265 /17600
- ^{1} French Land Register data, which excludes lakes, ponds, glaciers > 1 km^{2} (0.386 sq mi or 247 acres) and river estuaries.

Nieulle-sur-Seudre (French pronunciation: [njœl syʁ sødʁ], literally Nieulle on Seudre, before 1962: Nieulle) is a commune in the Charente-Maritime department in southwestern France.

== Population ==
Historical population
Year	Pop.	±% p.a.
1968	535	—
1975	534	−0.03%
1982	515	−0.52%
1990	506	−0.22%
1999	643	+2.70%
2007	846	+3.49%
2012	1,174	+6.77%
2017	1,227	+0.89%
2023	1,220	−0.10%
Source: INSEE

== See also ==
- Communes of the Charente-Maritime department
