= Saint-Froult =

- Commune
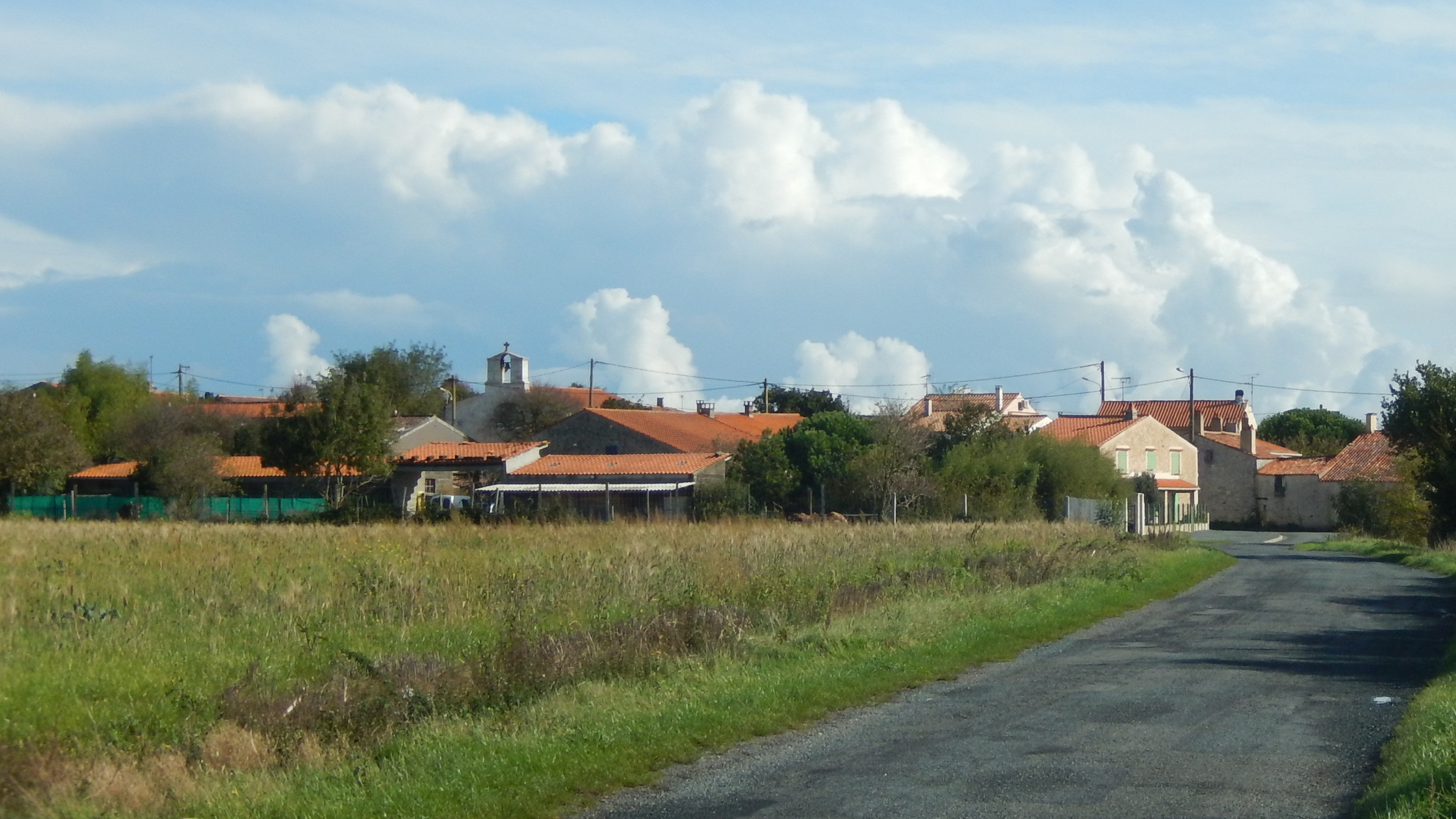
- A general view of Saint-Froult
- Location of Saint-Froult
- Location within France Location within Nouvelle-Aquitaine
- Coordinates: 45°55′07″N 1°03′31″W
- Country: France
- Region: Nouvelle-Aquitaine
- Department: Charente-Maritime
- Arrondissement: Rochefort
- Canton: Marennes
- Intercommunality: CA Rochefort Océan

Government
  - Mayor (2020–2026): Simon Villard
- Area^{1}: 6.39 km^{2} (2.47 sq mi)
- Elevation: 5 m (16 ft)
- Highest elevation: 10 m (33 ft)
- Lowest elevation: 0 m (0 ft)
- Population (2023): 400
  - Density: 63/km^{2} (160/sq mi)
- Time zone: UTC+01:00 (CET)
  - Summer (DST): UTC+02:00 (CEST)
- INSEE/Postal code: 17329 /17780
- ^{1} French Land Register data, which excludes lakes, ponds, glaciers > 1 km^{2} (0.386 sq mi or 247 acres) and river estuaries.

Saint-Froult (French pronunciation: [sɛ̃ fʁu]) is a commune in the Charente-Maritime department in southwestern France.

== Population ==
Historical population
Year	Pop.	±% p.a.
1968	180	—
1975	182	+0.16%
1982	227	+3.21%
1990	245	+0.96%
1999	234	−0.51%
2007	270	+1.80%
2012	391	+7.69%
2017	335	−3.04%
2023	400	+3.00%
Source: INSEE

== See also ==
- Communes of the Charente-Maritime department
