= Échillais =

- Commune
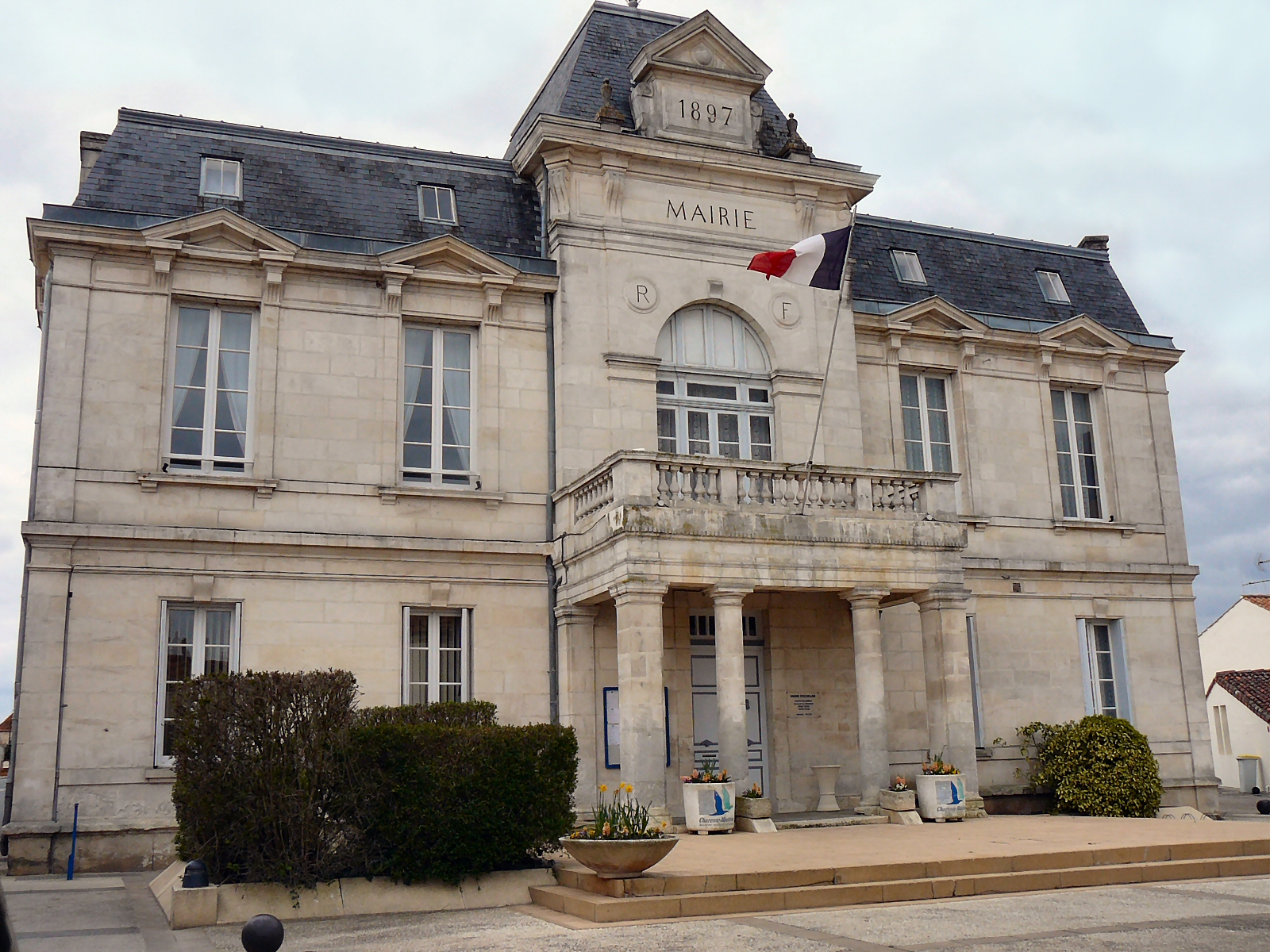
- The town hall in Échillais
- Location of Échillais
- Location within France Location within Nouvelle-Aquitaine
- Coordinates: 45°53′54″N 0°57′06″W
- Country: France
- Region: Nouvelle-Aquitaine
- Department: Charente-Maritime
- Arrondissement: Rochefort
- Canton: Tonnay-Charente
- Intercommunality: CA Rochefort Océan

Government
  - Mayor (2020–2026): Claude Maugan
- Area^{1}: 14.72 km^{2} (5.68 sq mi)
- Highest elevation: 18 m (59 ft)
- Lowest elevation: 0 m (0 ft)
- Population (2023): 3,765
  - Density: 255.8/km^{2} (662.5/sq mi)
- Time zone: UTC+01:00 (CET)
  - Summer (DST): UTC+02:00 (CEST)
- INSEE/Postal code: 17146 /17620
- ^{1} French Land Register data, which excludes lakes, ponds, glaciers > 1 km^{2} (0.386 sq mi or 247 acres) and river estuaries.

Échillais (French pronunciation: [eʃilɛ]) is a commune in the Charente-Maritime department in southwestern France.

== Population ==
Historical population
Year	Pop.	±% p.a.
1968	1,476	—
1975	1,847	+3.26%
1982	2,575	+4.86%
1990	2,672	+0.46%
1999	2,821	+0.60%
2007	3,269	+1.86%
2012	3,341	+0.44%
2017	3,545	+1.19%
2023	3,765	+1.01%
Source: INSEE

== See also ==
- Communes of the Charente-Maritime department
