= La Gripperie-Saint-Symphorien =

- Commune
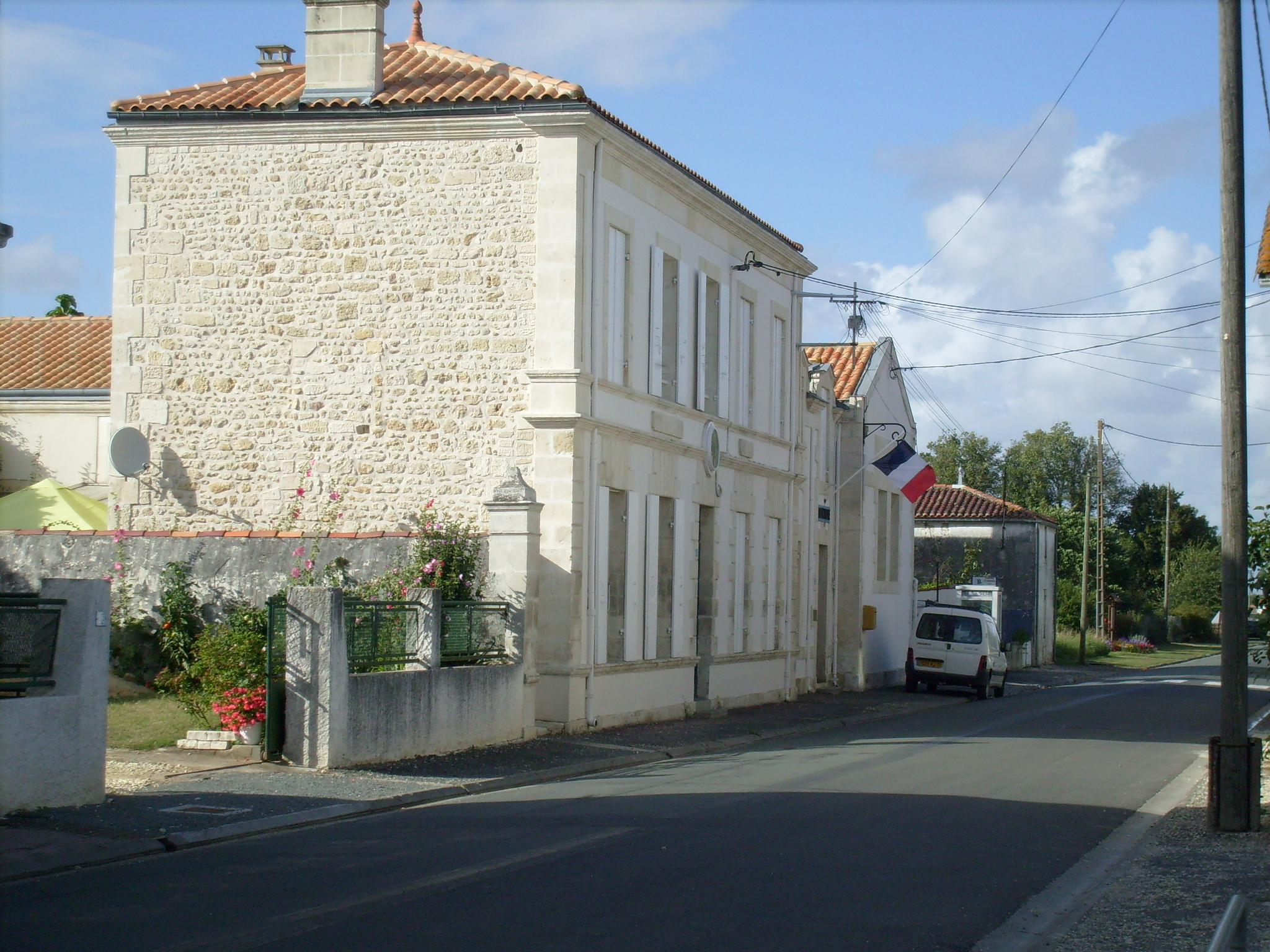
- The town hall in La Gripperie-Saint-Symphorien

- Coat of arms
- Location of La Gripperie-Saint-Symphorien
- Location within France Location within Nouvelle-Aquitaine
- Coordinates: 45°48′05″N 0°57′01″W
- Country: France
- Region: Nouvelle-Aquitaine
- Department: Charente-Maritime
- Arrondissement: Rochefort
- Canton: Marennes
- Intercommunality: CA Rochefort Océan

Government
  - Mayor (2020–2026): Denis Rouyer
- Area^{1}: 18.16 km^{2} (7.01 sq mi)
- Highest elevation: 39 m (128 ft)
- Lowest elevation: 2 m (6.6 ft)
- Population (2023): 604
  - Density: 33.3/km^{2} (86.1/sq mi)
- Time zone: UTC+01:00 (CET)
  - Summer (DST): UTC+02:00 (CEST)
- INSEE/Postal code: 17184 /17620
- ^{1} French Land Register data, which excludes lakes, ponds, glaciers > 1 km^{2} (0.386 sq mi or 247 acres) and river estuaries.

La Gripperie-Saint-Symphorien (French pronunciation: [la ɡʁipʁi sɛ̃ sɛ̃fɔʁjɛ̃]) is a commune in the Charente-Maritime department in southwestern France.

== Population ==
Historical population
Year	Pop.	±% p.a.
1968	331	—
1975	321	−0.44%
1982	364	+1.81%
1990	402	+1.25%
1999	473	+1.82%
2007	450	−0.62%
2012	582	+5.28%
2017	593	+0.38%
2023	604	+0.31%
Source: INSEE

== See also ==
- Communes of the Charente-Maritime department
