= Lussant =

- Commune
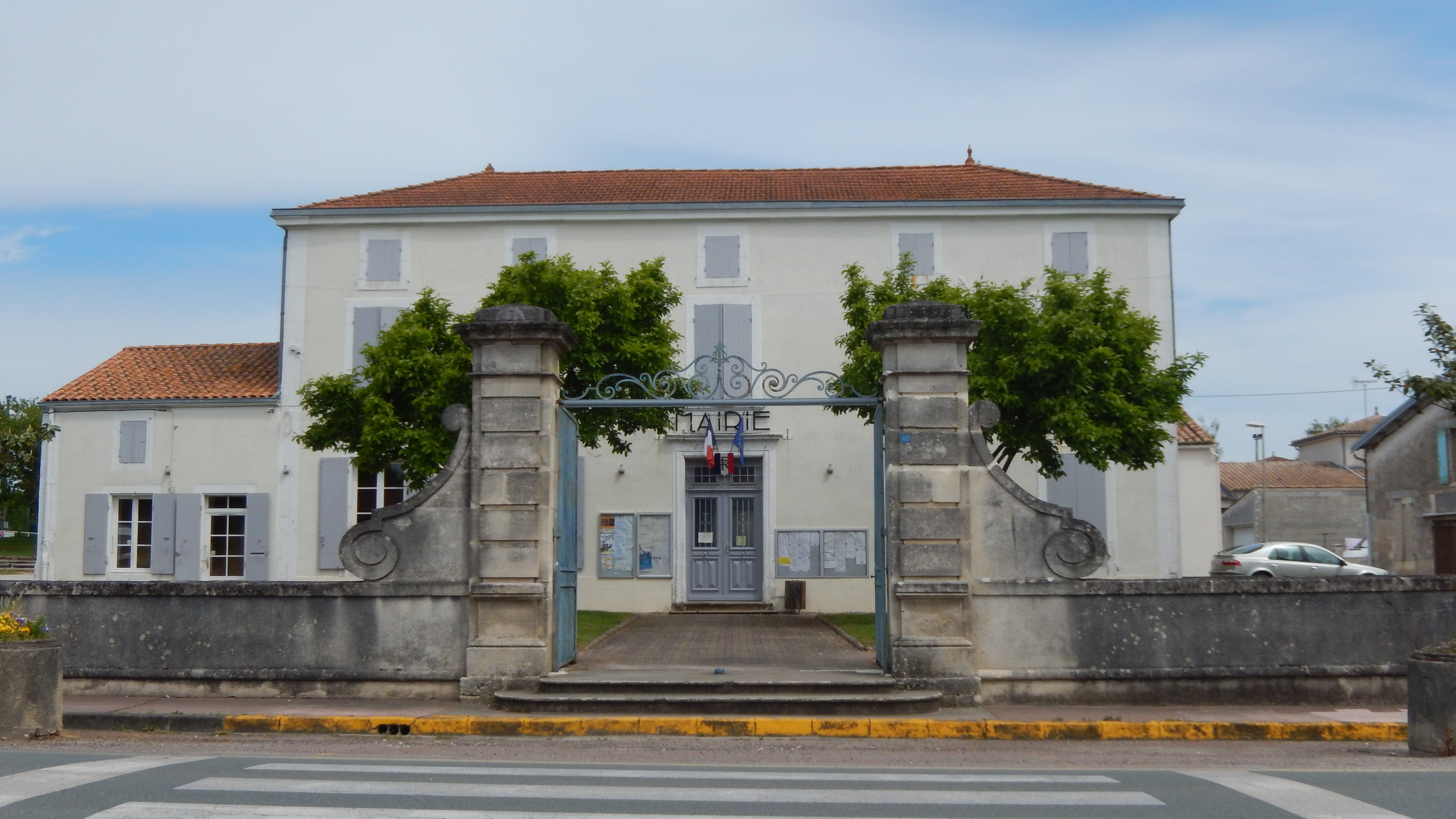
- The town hall in Lussant
- Location of Lussant
- Location within France Location within Nouvelle-Aquitaine
- Coordinates: 45°57′39″N 0°49′20″W
- Country: France
- Region: Nouvelle-Aquitaine
- Department: Charente-Maritime
- Arrondissement: Rochefort
- Canton: Tonnay-Charente
- Intercommunality: CA Rochefort Océan

Government
  - Mayor (2020–2026): Jacques Gontier
- Area^{1}: 8.79 km^{2} (3.39 sq mi)
- Highest elevation: 28 m (92 ft)
- Lowest elevation: 1 m (3.3 ft)
- Population (2023): 1,004
  - Density: 114/km^{2} (296/sq mi)
- Time zone: UTC+01:00 (CET)
  - Summer (DST): UTC+02:00 (CEST)
- INSEE/Postal code: 17216 /17430
- ^{1} French Land Register data, which excludes lakes, ponds, glaciers > 1 km^{2} (0.386 sq mi or 247 acres) and river estuaries.

Lussant (French pronunciation: [lysɑ̃]) is a commune in the Charente-Maritime department in southwestern France.

== Geography ==
The Boutonne river forms most of the commune's southern border.

== Population ==
Historical population
Year	Pop.	±% p.a.
1968	705	—
1975	710	+0.10%
1982	725	+0.30%
1990	763	+0.64%
1999	831	+0.95%
2007	899	+0.99%
2012	962	+1.36%
2017	1,002	+0.82%
2023	1,004	+0.03%
Source: INSEE

== See also ==
- Communes of the Charente-Maritime department
