= Charente (river) =

River in southwestern France

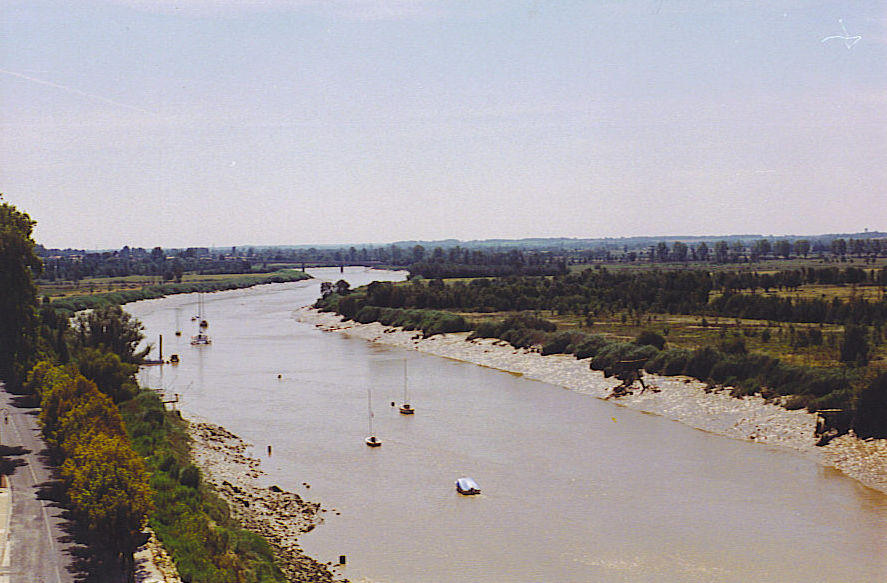
- The Charente in Tonnay-Charente

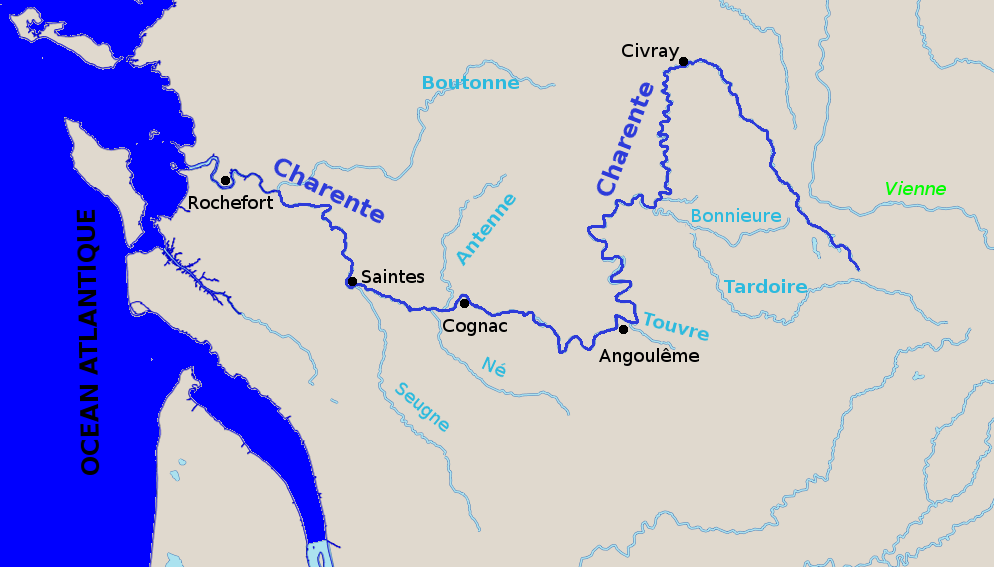
- The Charente and its main tributaries
- Native name: Charanta (Occitan)

Location
- Country: France

Physical characteristics
- Source
  - location: Haute-Vienne
- Mouth
  - location: Atlantic Ocean
  - coordinates: 45°57′24″N 1°4′56″W
- Length: 381 km (237 mi)
- Basin size: 10,000 km^{2} (3,900 mi^{2})
- Discharge
  - average: 40 m^{3}/s (1,400 cu ft/s)

The Charente (French pronunciation: [ʃaʁɑ̃t]; Occitan: Charanta [tʃaˈɾantɔ]) is a 381-kilometre (237 mi) long river in southwestern France. Its source is in the department of Haute-Vienne at Chéronnac, a small village near Rochechouart. It flows through the departments of Haute-Vienne, Charente, Vienne and Charente-Maritime. The river flows into the Atlantic Ocean near Rochefort.

== Navigation ==
The Charente was described by the French king François I as 'the most beautiful river in the kingdom', and was navigable in its natural state until mills were erected at many locations in the 14th century. Some locks were built but through navigation remained impossible for centuries. Improvements to the navigation were projected under Louis XVI in 1772, but work was interrupted by the Revolution. The project was revived under the Restoration and canalisation completed in 1835. The waterway was abandoned in 1957. The départements took over operation in 1963, and the waterway is now entirely recreational for the 164 km to the town of Angoulême.

The historic towns of Cognac, Jarnac, Saintes and Rochefort make the river a popular destination for boaters, mainly in rental boats, with moorings provided at most towns and villages along the route. The locks are 34.8 by 6.5 metres (114 by 21 ft).

== Tributaries ==
Tributaries include the rivers Antenne, Boëme, Né, Coran, Seugne, Bramerit, Boutonne, Arnoult, Touvre and Bonnieure.

The river Boutonne is navigable over a distance of 31 km to Saint-Jean-d'Angély, but a barrier at the confluence prevents access except under exceptional conditions.

== Towns ==
Towns and villages include Vergeroux, Soubise, Rochefort and Tonnay-Charente on the tidal river, and Saint-Savinien, Taillebourg, Saintes, Cognac, Jarnac, Saint-Simon and Angoulême on the navigable river, while Montignac-Charente and Civray are on the river's upper course.

== See also ==
- Kaolin deposits of the Charentes Basin
- History of Charente
