= Communauté d'agglomération Rochefort Océan =

Rochefort Océan
- Communauté d'agglomération
- Interactive map of Rochefort Océan
- Coordinates: 45°57′N 00°57′W
- Country: France
- Region: Nouvelle-Aquitaine
- Department: Charente-Maritime
- No. of communes: {{{nbcomm}}}
- Established: 2014
- Area: 421.4 km^{2} (162.7 sq mi)
- Population (2019): 63,480
  - Density: 150.6/km^{2} (390.2/sq mi)
- Website: www.agglo-rochefortocean.fr

The communauté d'agglomération Rochefort Océan (pronounced [ʁɔʃfɔʁ ɔseɑ̃]; CARO) is the agglomeration community, an intercommunal structure, centred on the commune of Rochefort, Charente-Maritime, Nouvelle-Aquitaine, southwestern France. Created in 2014, its seat is in Rochefort. Its area is 421.4 km^{2}. Its population was 63,480 in 2019, of which 23,584 in Rochefort proper.

== Composition ==
The communauté d'agglomération consists of the following 25 communes:

1. Beaugeay
2. Breuil-Magné
3. Cabariot
4. Champagne
5. Échillais
6. Fouras
7. La Gripperie-Saint-Symphorien
8. Île-d'Aix
9. Loire-les-Marais
10. Lussant
11. Moëze
12. Moragne
13. Muron
14. Port-des-Barques
15. Rochefort
16. Saint-Agnant
17. Saint-Coutant-le-Grand
18. Saint-Froult
19. Saint-Hippolyte
20. Saint-Jean-d'Angle
21. Saint-Laurent-de-la-Prée
22. Saint-Nazaire-sur-Charente
23. Soubise
24. Tonnay-Charente
25. Vergeroux
