= Saint-Jean-d'Angle =

- Commune
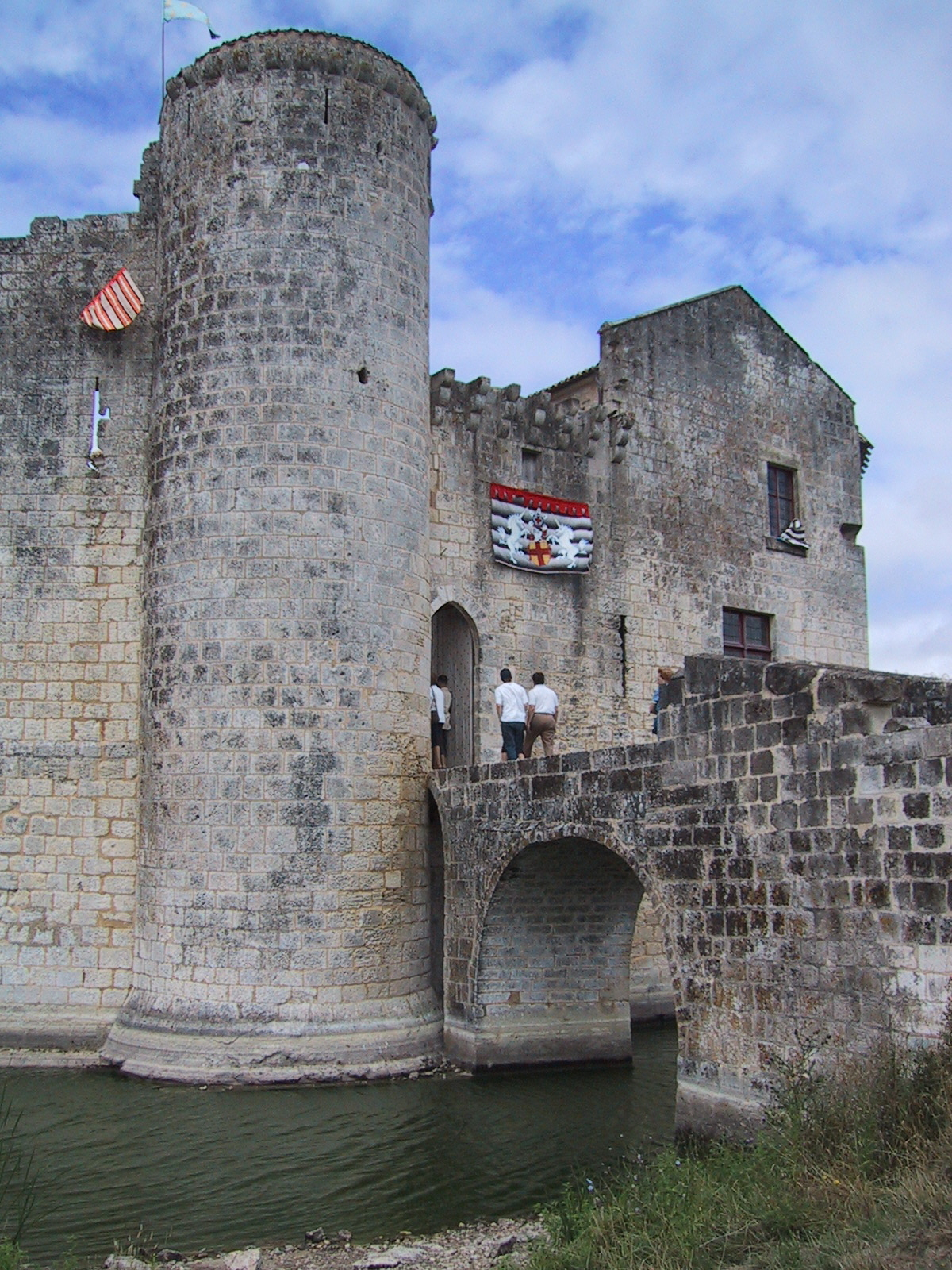
- Chateau

- Coat of arms
- Location of Saint-Jean-d'Angle
- Location within France Location within Nouvelle-Aquitaine
- Coordinates: 45°49′12″N 0°56′44″W
- Country: France
- Region: Nouvelle-Aquitaine
- Department: Charente-Maritime
- Arrondissement: Rochefort
- Canton: Marennes
- Intercommunality: CA Rochefort Océan

Government
  - Mayor (2020–2026): Michel Durieux
- Area^{1}: 21.61 km^{2} (8.34 sq mi)
- Elevation: 27 m (89 ft)
- Highest elevation: 32 m (105 ft)
- Lowest elevation: 2 m (6.6 ft)
- Population (2023): 699
  - Density: 32.3/km^{2} (83.8/sq mi)
- Time zone: UTC+01:00 (CET)
  - Summer (DST): UTC+02:00 (CEST)
- INSEE/Postal code: 17348 /17620
- ^{1} French Land Register data, which excludes lakes, ponds, glaciers > 1 km^{2} (0.386 sq mi or 247 acres) and river estuaries.

Saint-Jean-d'Angle (French pronunciation: [sɛ̃ ʒɑ̃ dɑ̃ɡl]) is a commune in the Charente-Maritime department in southwestern France.

== Population ==
Historical population
Year	Pop.	±% p.a.
1968	456	—
1975	431	−0.80%
1982	464	+1.06%
1990	486	+0.58%
1999	510	+0.54%
2007	536	+0.62%
2012	662	+4.31%
2017	693	+0.92%
2023	699	+0.14%
Source: INSEE

== Sport ==
Saint-Jean-d'Angle has been host to the French Sidecarcross Grand Prix numerous times.

== See also ==
- Communes of the Charente-Maritime department
