= Saint-Agnant, Charente-Maritime =

Saint-Agnant
- Commune
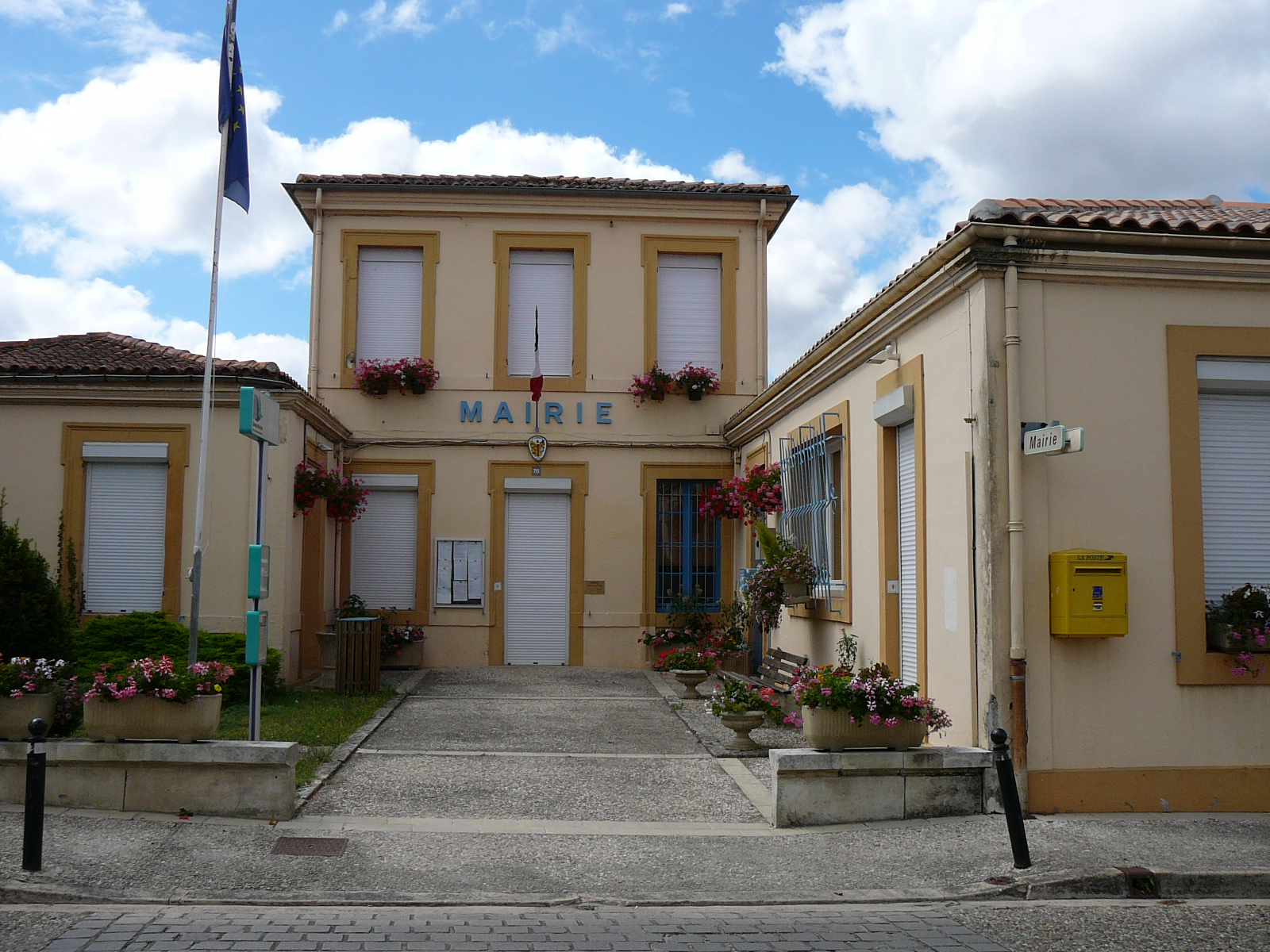
- The town hall in Saint-Agnant
- Location of Saint-Agnant
- Location within France Location within Nouvelle-Aquitaine
- Coordinates: 45°52′23″N 0°57′36″W
- Country: France
- Region: Nouvelle-Aquitaine
- Department: Charente-Maritime
- Arrondissement: Rochefort
- Canton: Marennes
- Intercommunality: CA Rochefort Océan

Government
  - Mayor (2020–2026): Bernard Giraud
- Area^{1}: 22.49 km^{2} (8.68 sq mi)
- Elevation: 11 m (36 ft)
- Highest elevation: 24 m (79 ft)
- Lowest elevation: 2 m (6.6 ft)
- Population (2023): 2,780
  - Density: 124/km^{2} (320/sq mi)
- Time zone: UTC+01:00 (CET)
  - Summer (DST): UTC+02:00 (CEST)
- INSEE/Postal code: 17308 /17620
- ^{1} French Land Register data, which excludes lakes, ponds, glaciers > 1 km^{2} (0.386 sq mi or 247 acres) and river estuaries.

Saint-Agnant (French pronunciation: [sɛ̃.t‿aɲɑ̃]) is a commune in the Charente-Maritime department in southwestern France.

== Population ==
Historical population
Year	Pop.	±% p.a.
1968	1,205	—
1975	1,346	+1.59%
1982	1,594	+2.45%
1990	1,830	+1.74%
1999	2,083	+1.45%
2007	2,329	+1.41%
2012	2,565	+1.95%
2017	2,682	+0.90%
2023	2,780	+0.60%
Source: INSEE

== See also ==
- Communes of the Charente-Maritime department
