= Beaugeay =

- Commune
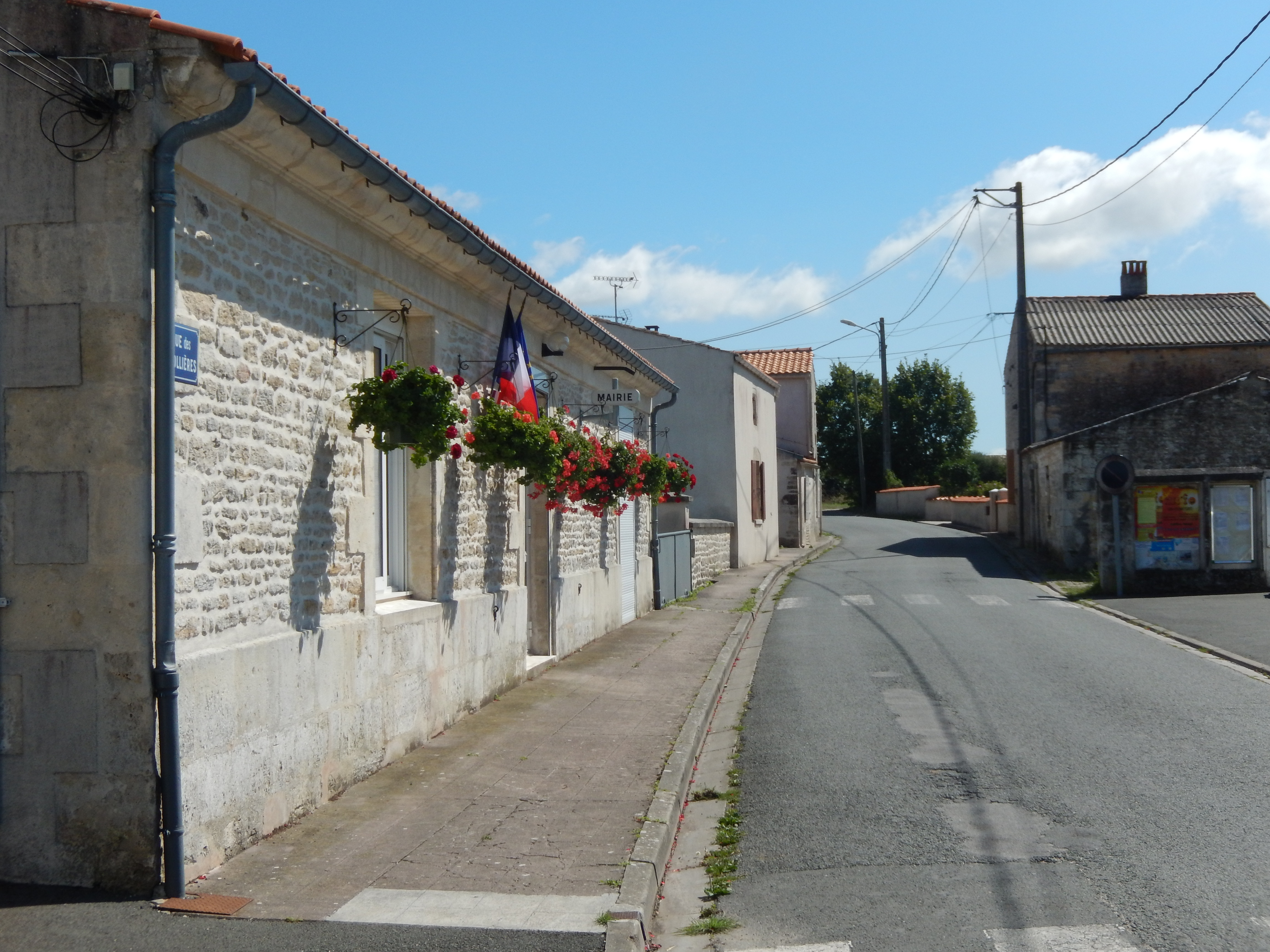
- The town hall in Beaugeay
- Location of Beaugeay
- Location within France Location within Nouvelle-Aquitaine
- Coordinates: 45°52′30″N 0°59′58″W
- Country: France
- Region: Nouvelle-Aquitaine
- Department: Charente-Maritime
- Arrondissement: Rochefort
- Canton: Marennes
- Intercommunality: CA Rochefort Océan

Government
  - Mayor (2020–2026): Joël Rossignol
- Area^{1}: 14.51 km^{2} (5.60 sq mi)
- Highest elevation: 17 m (56 ft)
- Lowest elevation: 1 m (3.3 ft)
- Population (2023): 794
  - Density: 54.7/km^{2} (142/sq mi)
- Time zone: UTC+01:00 (CET)
  - Summer (DST): UTC+02:00 (CEST)
- INSEE/Postal code: 17036 /17620
- ^{1} French Land Register data, which excludes lakes, ponds, glaciers > 1 km^{2} (0.386 sq mi or 247 acres) and river estuaries.

Beaugeay (French pronunciation: [boʒɛ]) is a commune in the Charente-Maritime department in southwestern France.

== Population ==
Historical population
Year	Pop.	±% p.a.
1968	185	—
1975	188	+0.23%
1982	333	+8.51%
1990	452	+3.89%
1999	470	+0.43%
2007	585	+2.77%
2012	750	+5.09%
2017	779	+0.76%
2023	794	+0.32%
Source: INSEE

== See also ==
- Communes of the Charente-Maritime department
