= Saint-Hippolyte, Charente-Maritime =

Saint-Hippolyte
- Commune
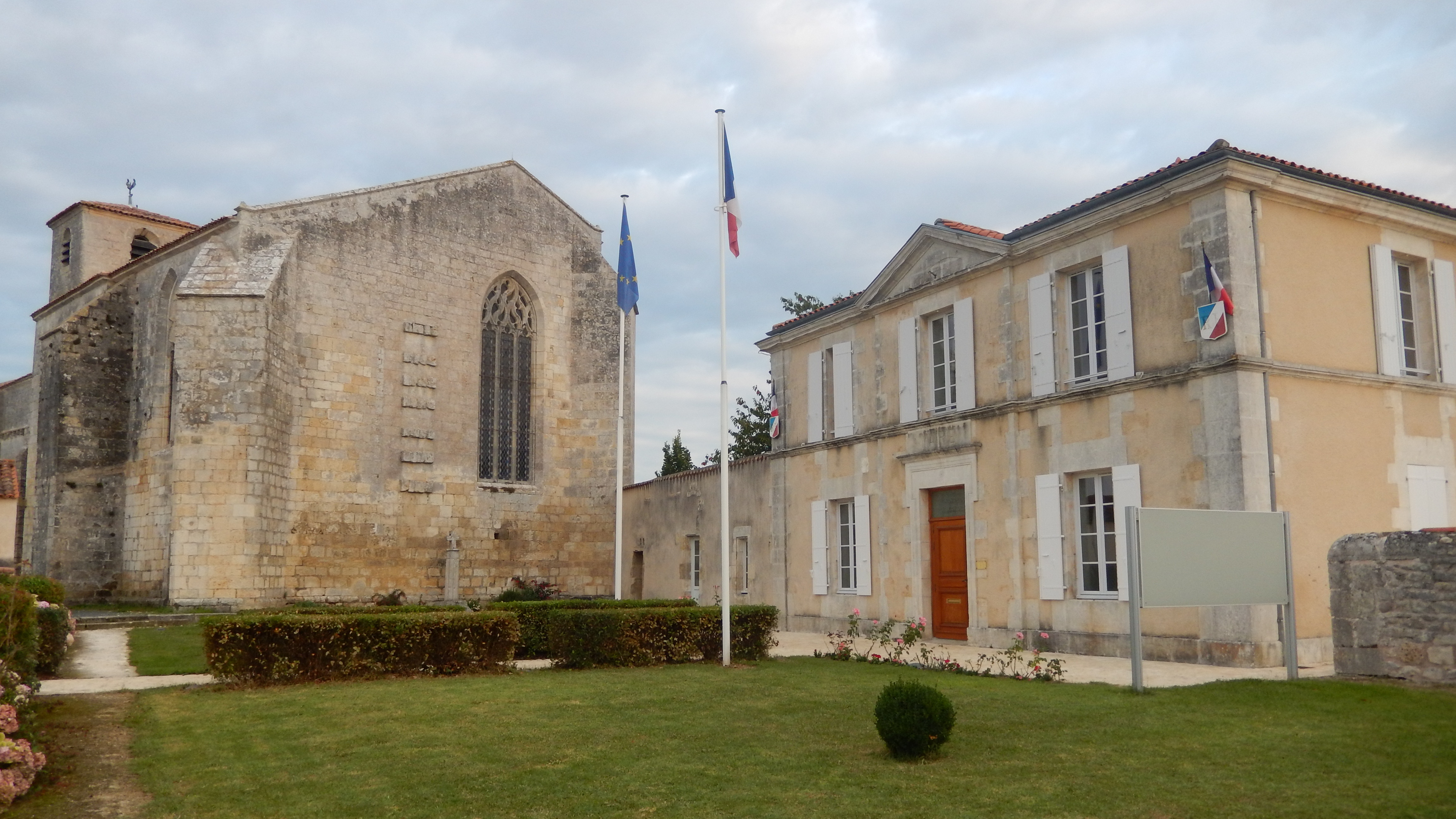
- The church and town hall in Saint-Hippolyte

- Coat of arms
- Location of Saint-Hippolyte
- Location within France Location within Nouvelle-Aquitaine
- Coordinates: 45°55′21″N 0°53′46″W
- Country: France
- Region: Nouvelle-Aquitaine
- Department: Charente-Maritime
- Arrondissement: Rochefort
- Canton: Tonnay-Charente
- Intercommunality: CA Rochefort Océan

Government
  - Mayor (2020–2026): Pierre Chevillon
- Area^{1}: 23.28 km^{2} (8.99 sq mi)
- Elevation: 5 m (16 ft)
- Highest elevation: 27 m (89 ft)
- Lowest elevation: 1 m (3.3 ft)
- Population (2023): 1,495
  - Density: 64.22/km^{2} (166.3/sq mi)
- Time zone: UTC+01:00 (CET)
  - Summer (DST): UTC+02:00 (CEST)
- INSEE/Postal code: 17346 /17430
- ^{1} French Land Register data, which excludes lakes, ponds, glaciers > 1 km^{2} (0.386 sq mi or 247 acres) and river estuaries.

Saint-Hippolyte (French pronunciation: [sɛ̃tipɔlit]) is a commune in the Charente-Maritime department, Nouvelle-Aquitaine (before 2015: Poitou-Charentes), southwestern France.

== Population ==
Historical population
Year	Pop.	±% p.a.
1968	858	—
1975	809	−0.84%
1982	969	+2.61%
1990	1,109	+1.70%
1999	1,121	+0.12%
2007	1,202	+0.88%
2012	1,388	+2.92%
2017	1,416	+0.40%
2023	1,495	+0.91%
Source: INSEE

== See also ==
- Communes of the Charente-Maritime department
