= Tonnay-Charente =

- Commune
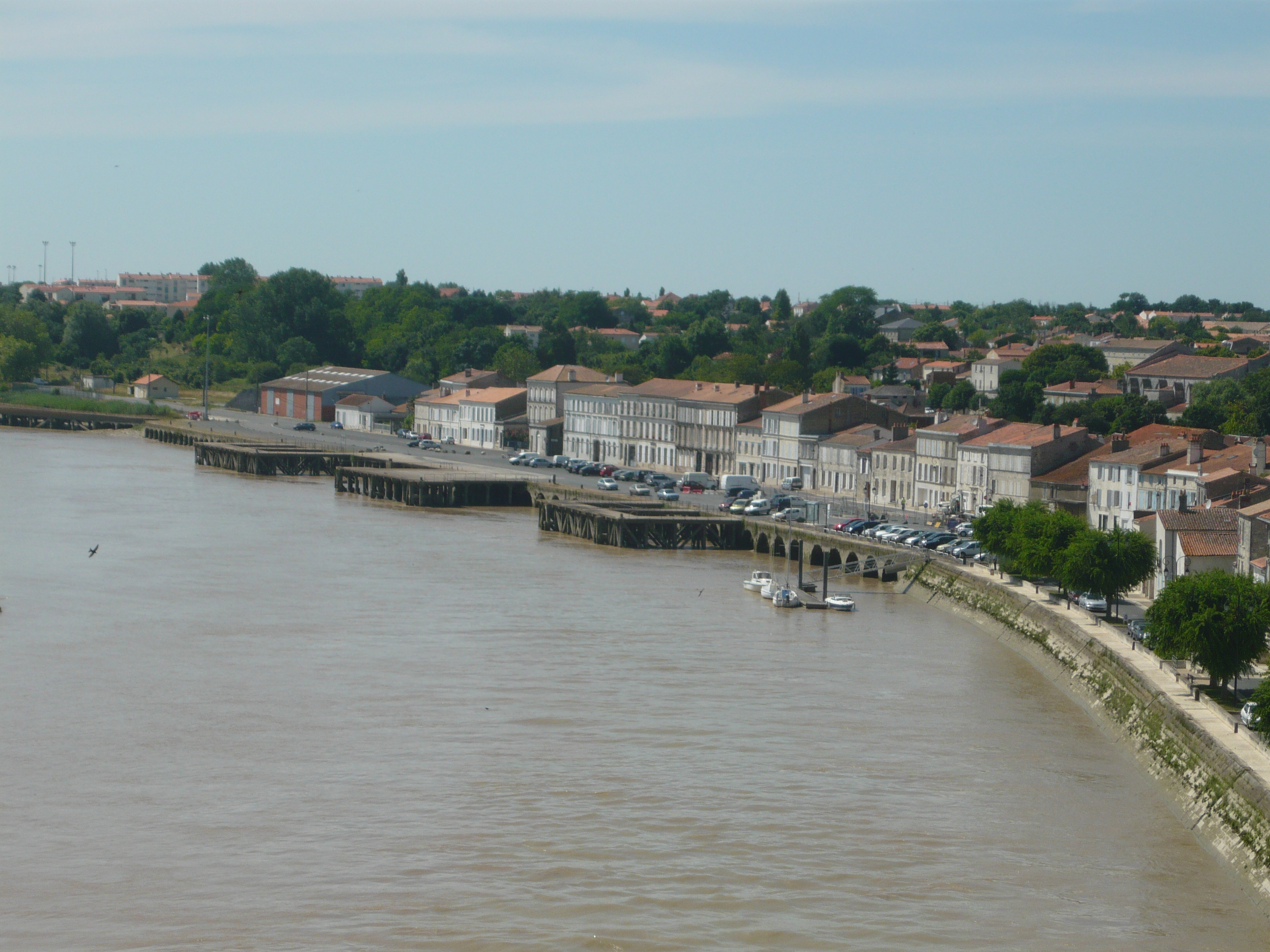
- The river Charente

- Coat of arms
- Location of Tonnay-Charente
- Location within France Location within Nouvelle-Aquitaine
- Coordinates: 45°56′55″N 0°54′27″W
- Country: France
- Region: Nouvelle-Aquitaine
- Department: Charente-Maritime
- Arrondissement: Rochefort
- Canton: Tonnay-Charente
- Intercommunality: CA Rochefort Océan

Government
  - Mayor (2020–2026): Éric Authiat
- Area^{1}: 34.39 km^{2} (13.28 sq mi)
- Highest elevation: 32 m (105 ft)
- Lowest elevation: 1 m (3.3 ft)
- Population (2023): 8,289
  - Density: 241.0/km^{2} (624.3/sq mi)
- Time zone: UTC+01:00 (CET)
  - Summer (DST): UTC+02:00 (CEST)
- INSEE/Postal code: 17449 /17430
- ^{1} French Land Register data, which excludes lakes, ponds, glaciers > 1 km^{2} (0.386 sq mi or 247 acres) and river estuaries.

Tonnay-Charente (French pronunciation: [tɔnɛ ʃaʁɑ̃t]) is a commune in the Charente-Maritime department, administrative region of Nouvelle-Aquitaine, France.

In the 18th century, it was the home town of prominent Irish physician Dr. Theobald Jennings and his son, Irish-born French General Charles Edward Jennings de Kilmaine who fought in the American War of Independence and, more significantly, in the French revolutionary wars with Napoleon I of France. There is a personal portrait of General Kilmaine in the Hôtel de Ville (City Hall) of Tonnay-Charente. Rue Kilmaine, a street in Tonnay-Charente was named in his honour.

== Population ==
Historical population

Year	Pop.	±% p.a.
1793	2,428	—
1800	2,275	−0.93%
1806	2,377	+0.73%
1821	1,173	−4.60%
1831	2,106	+6.03%
1836	3,202	+8.74%
1841	3,435	+1.41%
1846	3,296	−0.82%
1851	3,538	+1.43%
1856	3,699	+0.89%
1861	3,703	+0.02%
1866	3,763	+0.32%
1872	3,872	+0.48%
1876	3,756	−0.76%
1881	3,904	+0.78%
1886	4,287	+1.89%
1891	4,249	−0.18%
1896	4,462	+0.98%
1901	4,696	+1.03%

Year	Pop.	±% p.a.
1906	4,873	+0.74%
1911	4,911	+0.16%
1921	4,529	−0.81%
1926	4,495	−0.15%
1931	4,537	+0.19%
1936	4,859	+1.38%
1946	4,830	−0.06%
1954	5,161	+0.83%
1962	5,732	+1.32%
1968	6,332	+1.67%
1975	6,430	+0.22%
1982	6,380	−0.11%
1990	6,814	+0.83%
1999	6,628	−0.31%
2007	7,434	+1.44%
2012	7,817	+1.01%
2017	8,010	+0.49%
2023	8,289	+0.57%

Source: EHESS and INSEE (1968-2023)

== See also ==
- Charles Edward Jennings de Kilmaine
- Communes of the Charente-Maritime department
