= Vergeroux =

- Commune
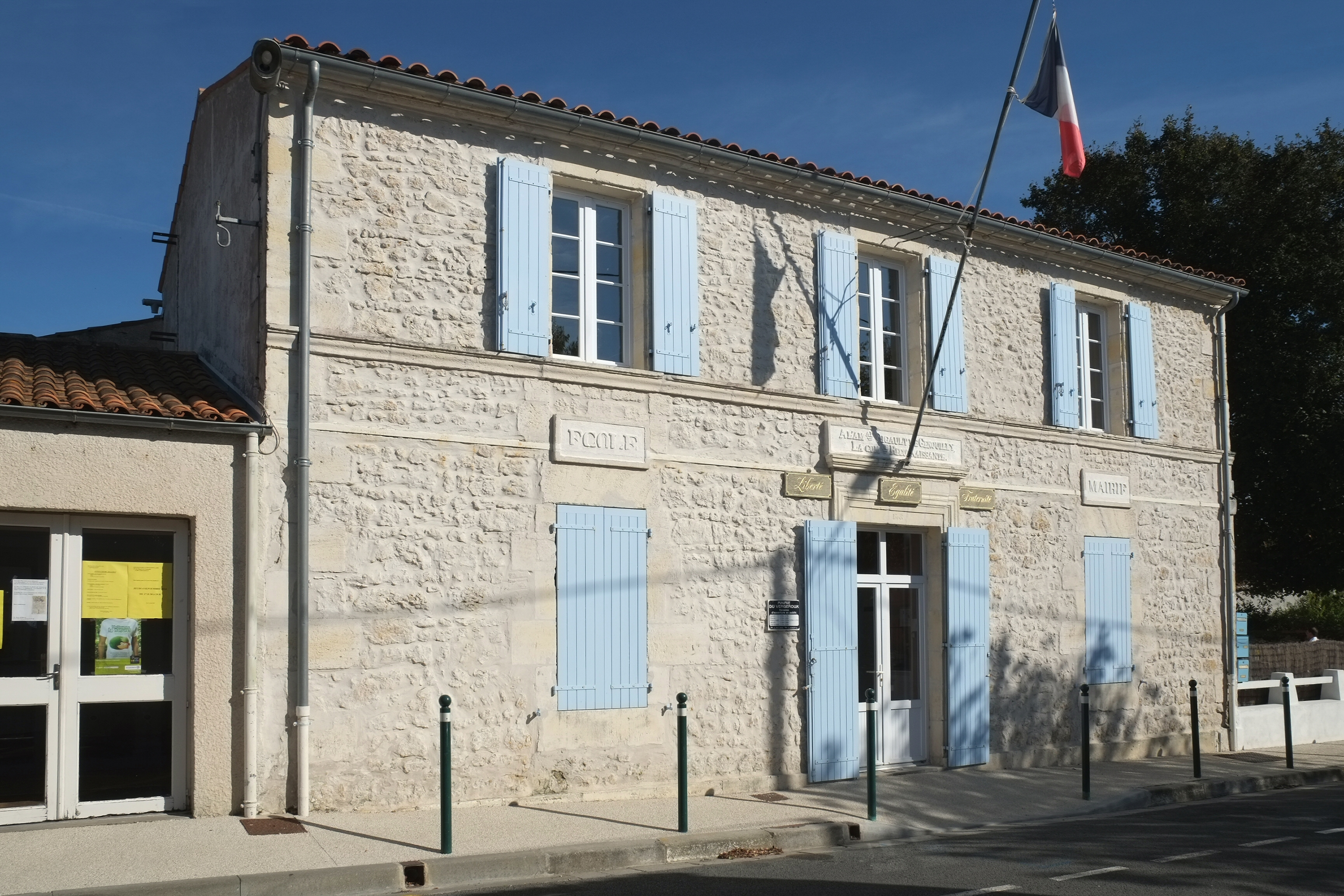
- The town hall in Vergeroux
- Location of Vergeroux
- Location within France Location within Nouvelle-Aquitaine
- Coordinates: 45°57′42″N 0°59′06″W
- Country: France
- Region: Nouvelle-Aquitaine
- Department: Charente-Maritime
- Arrondissement: Rochefort
- Canton: Tonnay-Charente
- Intercommunality: CA Rochefort Océan

Government
  - Mayor (2020–2026): Gilles Fort
- Area^{1}: 5.53 km^{2} (2.14 sq mi)
- Highest elevation: 18 m (59 ft)
- Lowest elevation: 0 m (0 ft)
- Population (2023): 1,279
  - Density: 231/km^{2} (599/sq mi)
- Time zone: UTC+01:00 (CET)
  - Summer (DST): UTC+02:00 (CEST)
- INSEE/Postal code: 17463 /17300
- ^{1} French Land Register data, which excludes lakes, ponds, glaciers > 1 km^{2} (0.386 sq mi or 247 acres) and river estuaries.

Vergeroux (French pronunciation: [vɛʁʒəʁu]) is a commune in the Charente-Maritime department, southwestern France.

== Population ==
Historical population
Year	Pop.	±% p.a.
1968	336	—
1975	430	+3.59%
1982	529	+3.00%
1990	551	+0.51%
1999	754	+3.55%
2007	965	+3.13%
2012	1,052	+1.74%
2017	1,208	+2.80%
2023	1,279	+0.96%
Source: INSEE

== See also ==
- Communes of the Charente-Maritime department
