= Genouillé, Charente-Maritime =

Genouillé
- Commune
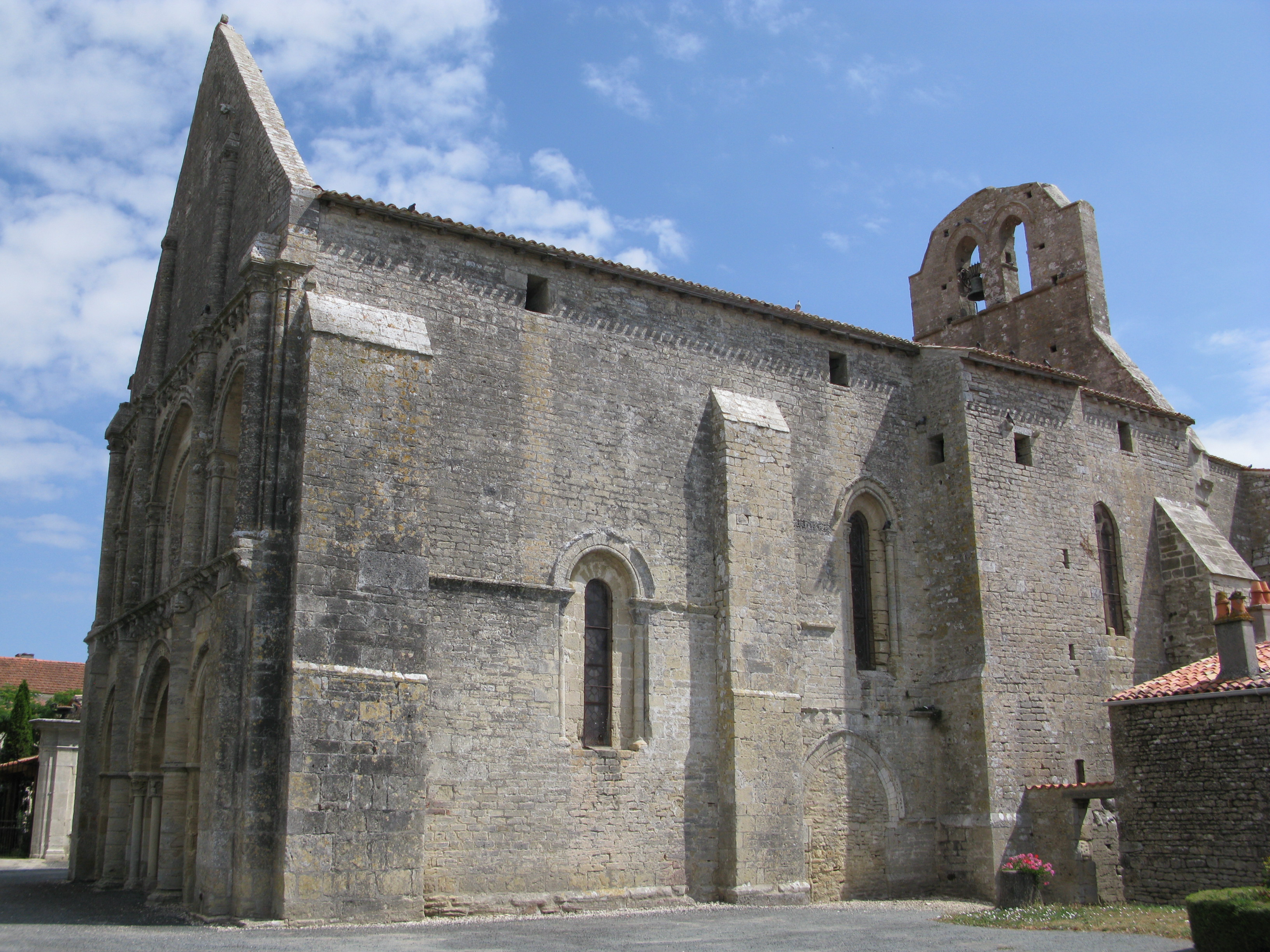
- The church in Genouillé

- Coat of arms
- Location of Genouillé
- Location within France Location within Nouvelle-Aquitaine
- Coordinates: 46°01′24″N 0°47′02″W
- Country: France
- Region: Nouvelle-Aquitaine
- Department: Charente-Maritime
- Arrondissement: Rochefort
- Canton: Tonnay-Charente
- Intercommunality: Aunis Sud

Government
  - Mayor (2020–2026): Jean-Michel Soussin
- Area^{1}: 34.41 km^{2} (13.29 sq mi)
- Highest elevation: 63 m (207 ft)
- Lowest elevation: 0 m (0 ft)
- Population (2023): 872
  - Density: 25.3/km^{2} (65.6/sq mi)
- Time zone: UTC+01:00 (CET)
  - Summer (DST): UTC+02:00 (CEST)
- INSEE/Postal code: 17174 /17430
- ^{1} French Land Register data, which excludes lakes, ponds, glaciers > 1 km^{2} (0.386 sq mi or 247 acres) and river estuaries.

Genouillé (French pronunciation: [ʒənuje]) is a commune in the Charente-Maritime department in southwestern France.

== Population ==
Historical population
Year	Pop.	±% p.a.
1968	679	—
1975	540	−3.22%
1982	534	−0.16%
1990	533	−0.02%
1999	644	+2.12%
2007	757	+2.04%
2012	812	+1.41%
2017	895	+1.97%
2023	872	−0.43%
Source: INSEE

== See also ==
- Communes of the Charente-Maritime department
