= Moëze =

- Commune
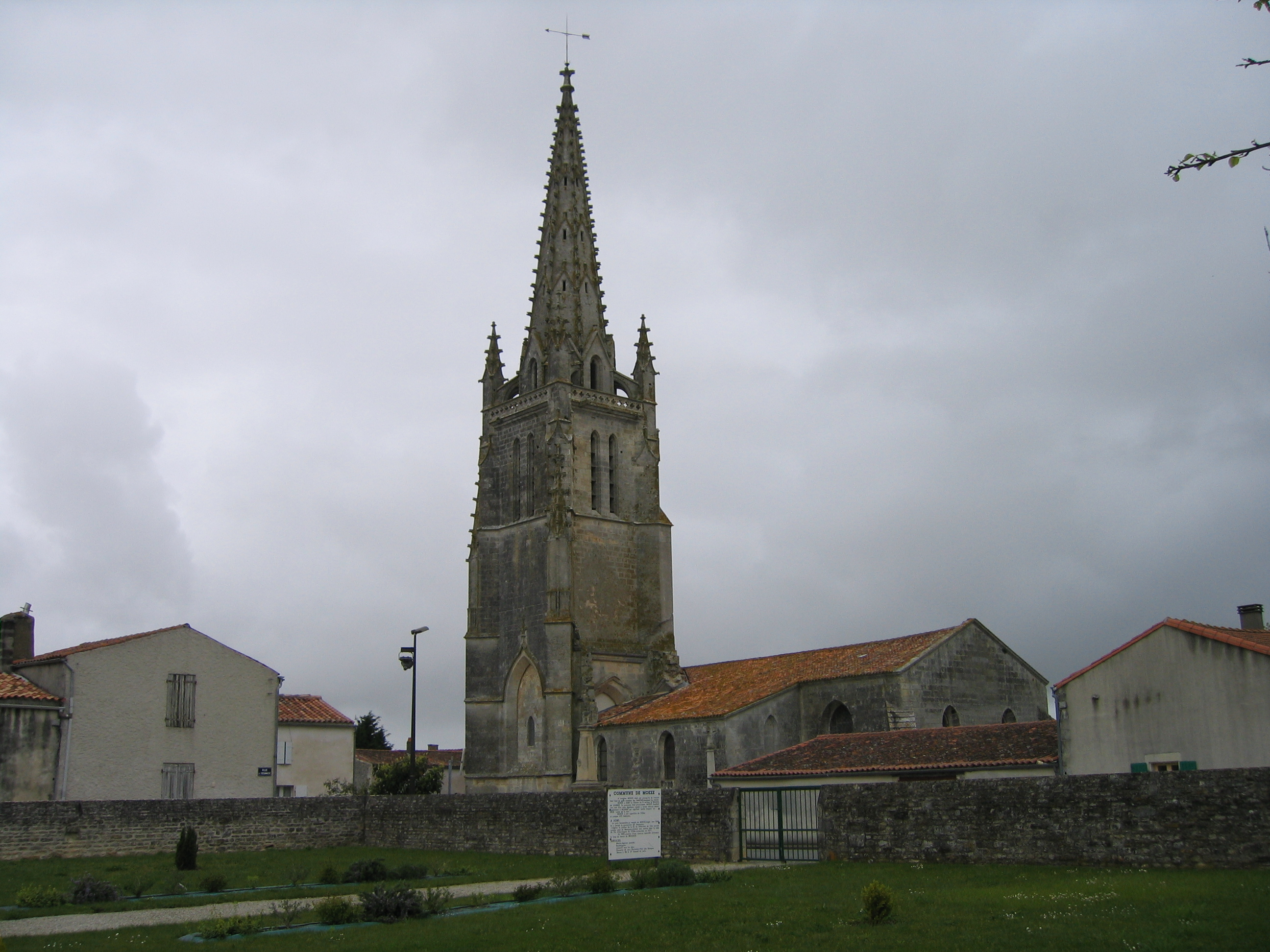
- The church in Moëze
- Location of Moëze
- Location within France Location within Nouvelle-Aquitaine
- Coordinates: 45°54′20″N 1°02′05″W
- Country: France
- Region: Nouvelle-Aquitaine
- Department: Charente-Maritime
- Arrondissement: Rochefort
- Canton: Marennes
- Intercommunality: CA Rochefort Océan

Government
  - Mayor (2020–2026): Didier Portron
- Area^{1}: 21.17 km^{2} (8.17 sq mi)
- Highest elevation: 15 m (49 ft)
- Lowest elevation: 0 m (0 ft)
- Population (2023): 600
  - Density: 28/km^{2} (73/sq mi)
- Time zone: UTC+01:00 (CET)
  - Summer (DST): UTC+02:00 (CEST)
- INSEE/Postal code: 17237 /17780
- ^{1} French Land Register data, which excludes lakes, ponds, glaciers > 1 km^{2} (0.386 sq mi or 247 acres) and river estuaries.

Moëze (French pronunciation: [mɔɛz]) is a commune in the Charente-Maritime department in southwestern France.

== Population ==
Historical population
Year	Pop.	±% p.a.
1968	280	—
1975	310	+1.46%
1982	383	+3.07%
1990	467	+2.51%
1999	463	−0.10%
2007	529	+1.68%
2012	551	+0.82%
2017	564	+0.47%
2023	600	+1.04%
Source: INSEE

== See also ==
- Communes of the Charente-Maritime department
