= Saint-Nazaire-sur-Charente =

- Commune
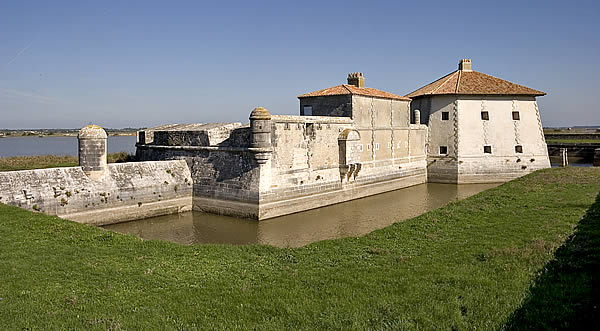
- Fort Lupin
- Location of Saint-Nazaire-sur-Charente
- Location within France Location within Nouvelle-Aquitaine
- Coordinates: 45°56′12″N 1°03′06″W
- Country: France
- Region: Nouvelle-Aquitaine
- Department: Charente-Maritime
- Arrondissement: Rochefort
- Canton: Tonnay-Charente
- Intercommunality: CA Rochefort Océan

Government
  - Mayor (2020–2026): Sylvain Gaurier
- Area^{1}: 20.31 km^{2} (7.84 sq mi)
- Elevation: 12 m (39 ft)
- Highest elevation: 21 m (69 ft)
- Lowest elevation: 0 m (0 ft)
- Population (2023): 1,210
  - Density: 59.6/km^{2} (154/sq mi)
- Time zone: UTC+01:00 (CET)
  - Summer (DST): UTC+02:00 (CEST)
- INSEE/Postal code: 17375 /17780
- ^{1} French Land Register data, which excludes lakes, ponds, glaciers > 1 km^{2} (0.386 sq mi or 247 acres) and river estuaries.

Saint-Nazaire-sur-Charente (French pronunciation: [sɛ̃ nazɛːʁ syʁ ʃaʁɑ̃t]) is a commune in the Charente-Maritime department in southwestern France.

In the 1680s, Fort Lupin was constructed near Saint-Nazaire-sur-Charente.

== Population ==
Historical population
Year	Pop.	±% p.a.
1968	770	—
1975	664	−2.09%
1982	855	+3.68%
1990	834	−0.31%
1999	850	+0.21%
2007	1,028	+2.41%
2012	1,184	+2.87%
2017	1,186	+0.03%
2023	1,210	+0.33%
Source: INSEE

== Places and Monuments ==
- Fontaine de Lupin (Lupin "fountain"): This building, set in the bed of the Charente river, was the source of supply for drinking water on ships from the Rochefort arsenal. It was located this far downstream to allow the ships to negotiate the muddy and shallow tidal estuary without the encumbrance of the considerable weight of water. The original construction of around 1676 was completely rebuilt in 1763; it is one of only three such watering places (aiguades) in France (the others being at Brest and Belle-Île). An elaborate supply system was involved, comprising capture of spring water from two inland sources (Fontaine des Morts, Fontaine de Fontpourry), conduit partly beneath the existing access road, and two enormous reservoir tanks (one of which still exists under the existing restaurant). The system was still in use early in the 20th century, but the water was then tested with modern means and found to be unsafe; now pontoons permit pleasure boats to moor here in Summer.
- Fort Lupin: A fort forming part of Vauban's coastal defence system. It was constructed from 1683 to 1686 to defend the Rochefort arsenal and the Fontaine Lupin (in conjunction with the advance posts on Île Madame and at Piedemont). The fort is not normally open to the public. An admirable feature is the symmetry of the building, - whereby the entrance is disposed symmetrically to the troops' toilets!
- "Carrelet" fishing pontoons, traditional fishing arrangements, line the Charente estuary as far as Rochefort. The "Carrelet" building takes its name from the eponymous square fishing net which is raised and lowered by means of a winch; the building itself is a wooden cabin on a platform at the end of a bridge crossing the shore line. Several associations defend this marine heritage.
- Saint Nazaire church: This building has witnessed numerous reconstructions, mainly as a result of the Hundred Years' War and the religious wars. Unusually for rural churches of the period, a sacristy was added at the end of the Middle Ages. The church is strikingly arranged in two naves, each of which with its own entrance portico and its own altar: the lavish South altar features a painting of the Virgin and Child by Hansmann, 1860. There is a remarkable ex-voto model of a two-decker, 74 gun ship called "le Zélé".
- The "Prison": Not much is known about this curious tiny building facing the road to Saint-Froult: there are similar buildings in Saint-Sornin nearby and on Martinique. Probably from the end of the 19th century, it is, at barely two metres square, considered one of the smallest prisons in France. It was presumably used for holding violent or drunk offenders very temporarily.

== See also ==
- Communes of the Charente-Maritime department
