= Canton of Tonnay-Charente =

Coordinates: 45.95°N 0.89°W

The canton of Tonnay-Charente is an administrative division of the Charente-Maritime department, western France. Its borders were modified at the French canton reorganisation which came into effect in March 2015. Its seat is in Tonnay-Charente.

It consists of the following communes:

1. Breuil-Magné
2. Cabariot
3. Échillais
4. Genouillé
5. Loire-les-Marais
6. Lussant
7. Moragne
8. Muron
9. Port-des-Barques
10. Saint-Coutant-le-Grand
11. Saint-Hippolyte
12. Saint-Nazaire-sur-Charente
13. Soubise
14. Tonnay-Charente
15. Vergeroux
