= Canton of Marennes =

Coordinates: 45.82°N 1.10°W

The canton of Marennes is an administrative division of the Charente-Maritime department, western France. Its borders were modified at the French canton reorganisation which came into effect in March 2015. Its seat is in Marennes-Hiers-Brouage.

It consists of the following communes:

1. Beaugeay
2. Bourcefranc-le-Chapus
3. Champagne
4. La Gripperie-Saint-Symphorien
5. Le Gua
6. Marennes-Hiers-Brouage
7. Moëze
8. Nieulle-sur-Seudre
9. Saint-Agnant
10. Saint-Froult
11. Saint-Jean-d'Angle
12. Saint-Just-Luzac
13. Saint-Sornin
