= Surgères =

- Commune
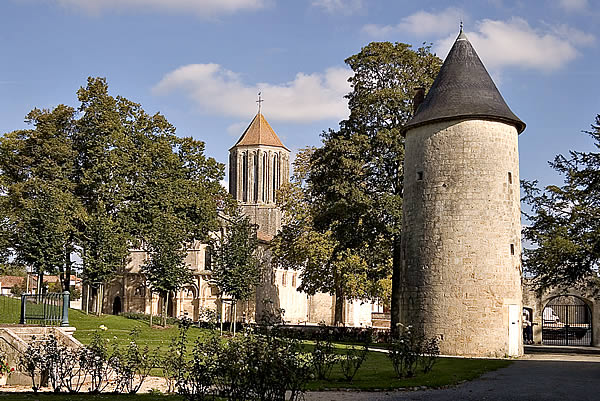
- The gardens near the town hall in Surgères

- Coat of arms
- Location of Surgères
- Location within France Location within Nouvelle-Aquitaine
- Coordinates: 46°06′23″N 0°44′58″W
- Country: France
- Region: Nouvelle-Aquitaine
- Department: Charente-Maritime
- Arrondissement: Rochefort
- Canton: Surgères

Government
  - Mayor (2020–2026): Catherine Desprez
- Area^{1}: 28.71 km^{2} (11.08 sq mi)
- Elevation: 25 m (82 ft)
- Highest elevation: 57 m (187 ft)
- Lowest elevation: 16 m (52 ft)
- Population (2023): 6,897
  - Density: 240.2/km^{2} (622.2/sq mi)
- Time zone: UTC+01:00 (CET)
  - Summer (DST): UTC+02:00 (CEST)
- INSEE/Postal code: 17434 /17700
- Website: http://www.ville-surgeres.fr/
- ^{1} French Land Register data, which excludes lakes, ponds, glaciers > 1 km^{2} (0.386 sq mi or 247 acres) and river estuaries.

Surgères (French pronunciation: [syʁʒɛʁ]) is a commune in the Charente-Maritime department, southwestern France. It is the home of the Surgères 48 Hour Race.

== History ==
=== Middle ages ===
The site of Surgères was occupied in Neolithic times, but the earliest recorded history comes from the Middle Ages. The Duke of Aquitaine wanted to guard his lands in Aunis against Norman invasion, so he built a stone and wood defence on the marshes, a bridgehead against the invaders which was known as Latin: Castrum Surgeriacum. At the end of the 10th century, the Counts of Poitiers started to acquire power in Aunis and appointed Guillaume Maingot to take charge of the fortress and part of the lands around it.

In the 12th century this defence had become a small city, whose lords entertained the grandees of the parliament of Saintonge. During this time a large castle was built on the ramparts, as was the Romanesque church of Notre-Dame. In 1152 Eleanor of Aquitaine married Henry II of England, thus putting her lands including Surgères into English hands.

Coming back under French rule with Saint Louis IX of France, the English took the town in a surprise raid in 1332 during the Hundred Years' War.

=== Renaissance and modern times (up to the French Revolution) ===
The history of Surgères is equally marked by Hélène de Fonsèque (1546–1618), Pierre de Ronsard's muse, whose beauty he celebrated in his Sonnets pour Hélène. Queen Catherine de' Medici encouraged the affair between the fifty-year-old Ronsard and the beautiful Hélène, so that she could be part of the royal court as one of the ladies-in-waiting.

Hélène was the daughter of Louis de Clermont and Roderic de Fonsèque, a Spanish family from Monterey. She married Philippe de Barbezières.

Surgères regained some prosperity during the 16th century before the French Wars of Religion. A coveted stronghold, it was occupied by Calvinists and then by Catholic troops after the fall of La Rochelle in 1628, when Cardinal Richelieu knocked down its ramparts.

=== 19th and 20th centuries ===
After the French Revolution of 1789, life in this little village became feudal with the domination of a rural bourgeoisie who took, as in all of France, a good deal of the lands of the Dukes of Rochefoucauld-Doudeauville, later Lords of Surgères.

Winemaking and the distillery contributed to a "Golden Age" for the town, but phylloxera brought it to an end in 1878. Afterwards, the dairy college (l'ENILIA : École nationale d'industrie laitière et d'industries agroalimentaires, "National College of Dairy and Agricultural Food Industries") contributed to the revival of Surgères.

In 1850 Surgères absorbed part of the old commune of Saint-Pierre-de-Surgères, the other part being reattached to the neighbouring commune of Saint-Germain-de-Marencennes.

== Heritage ==
=== Places and monuments ===
- Romanesque church of Notre-Dame, built in the 16th and 17th centuries, classified as a Monument historique (Historic Monument) since 1862.
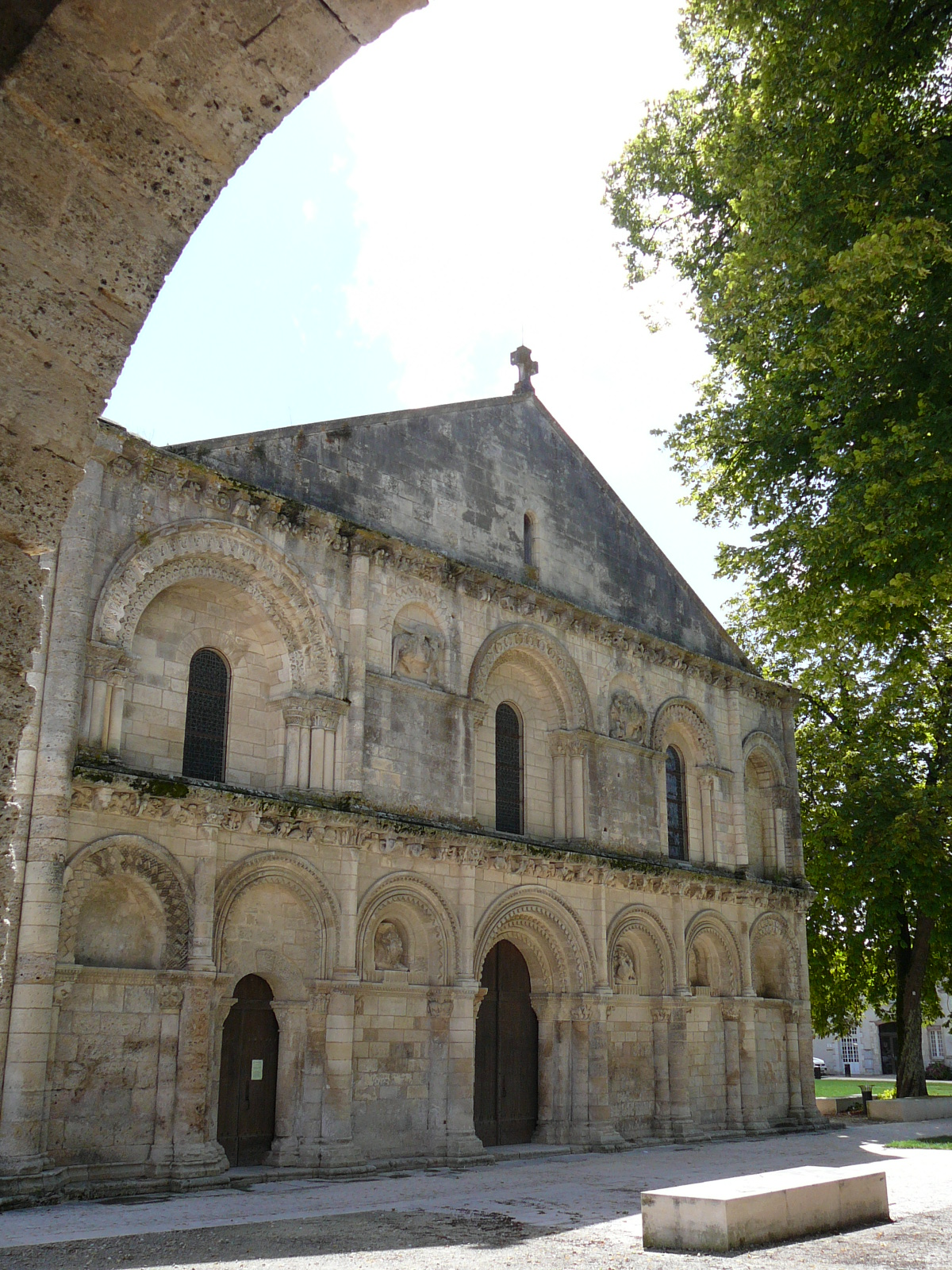
Notre-Dame church, front

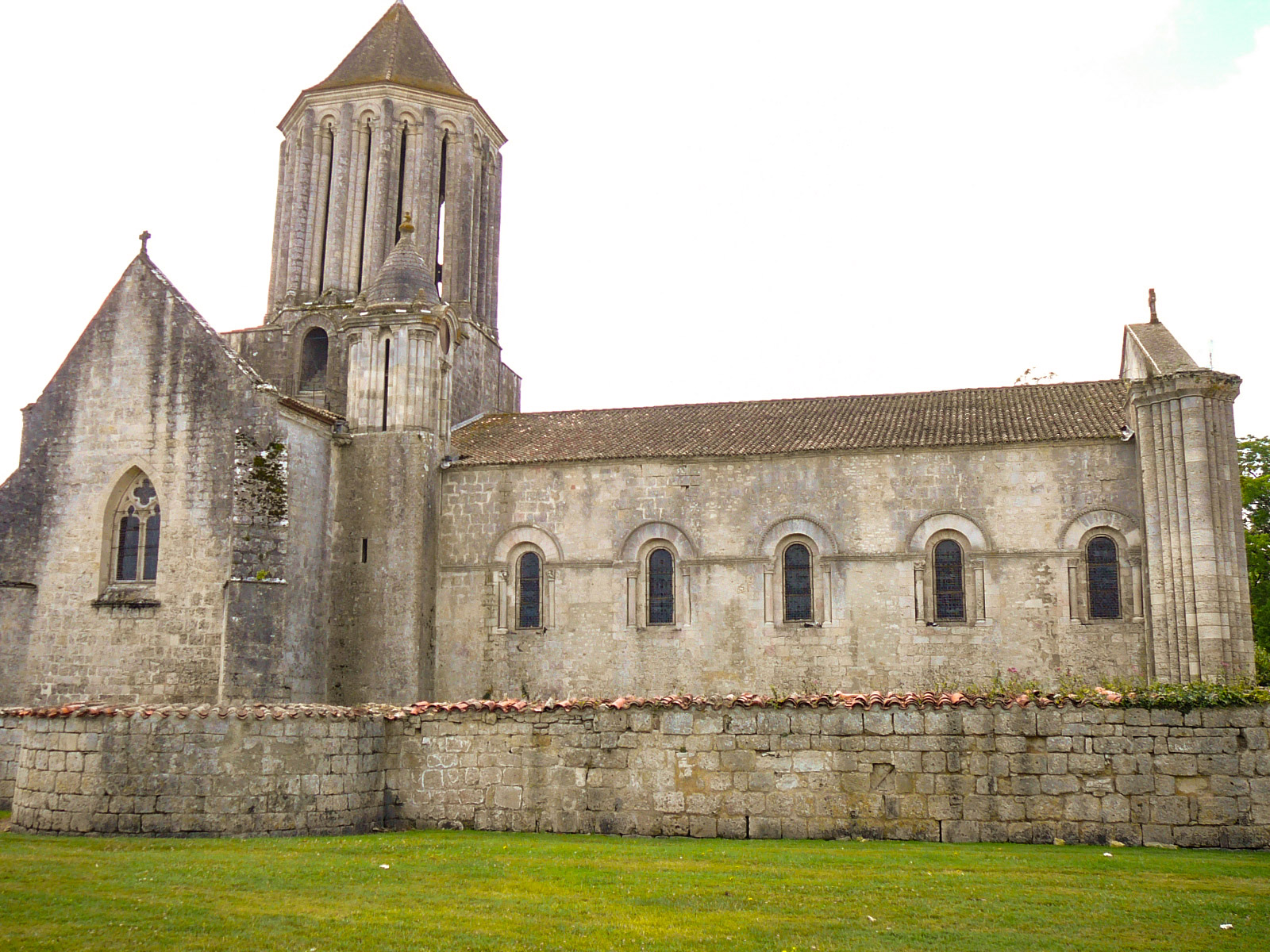
Notre-Dame church, side

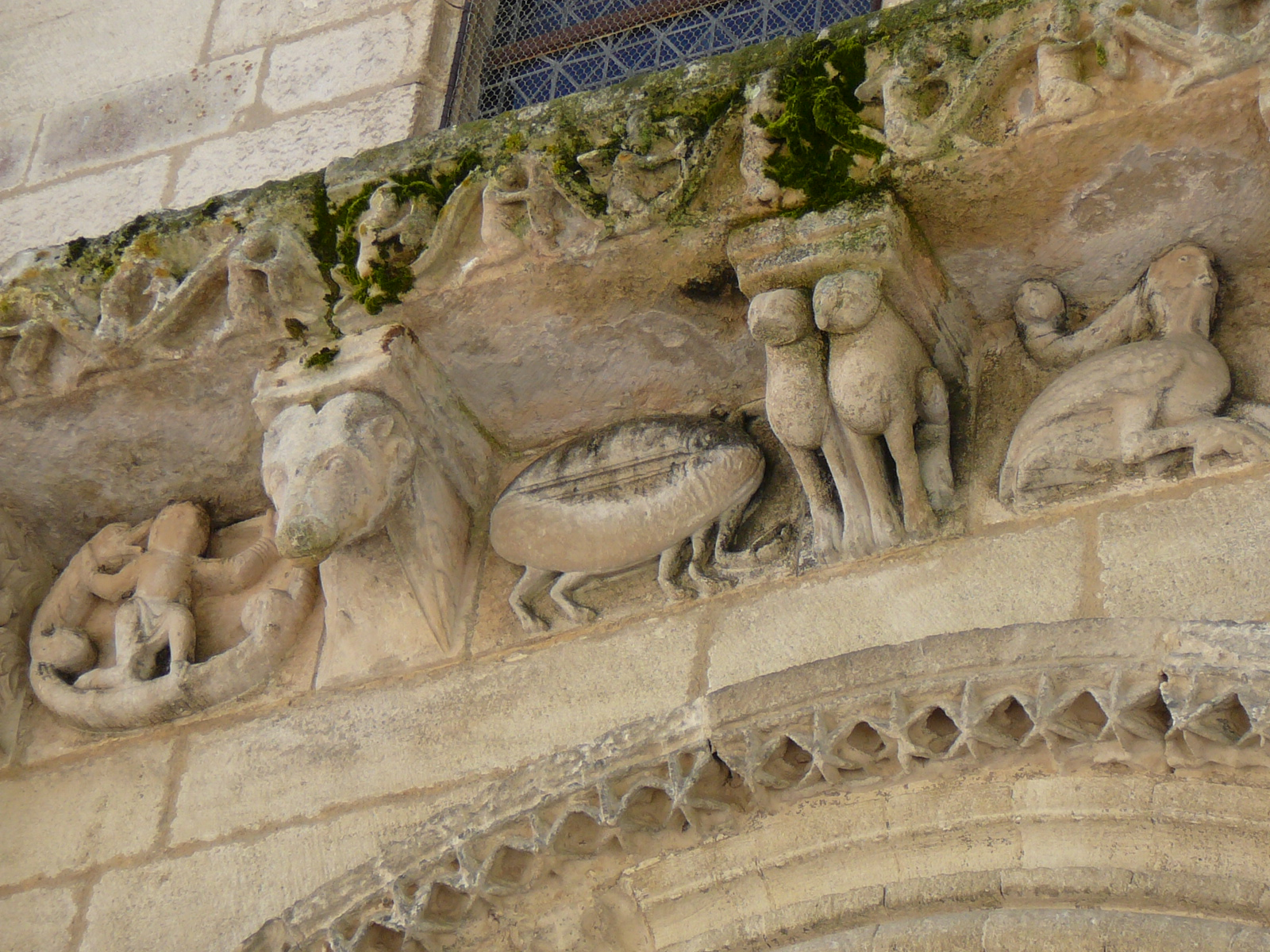
Notre-Dame church, detail

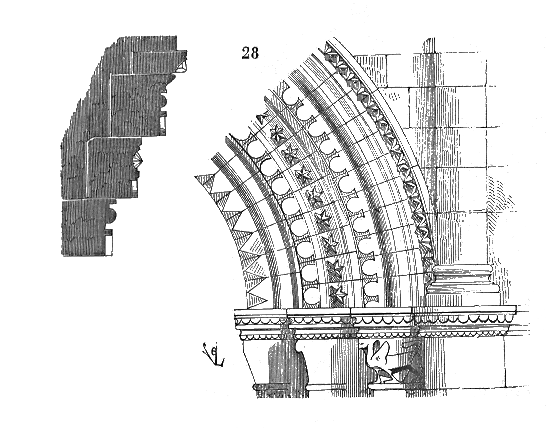
Notre-Dame church, drawing of a vaulted arch
- The 16th-century ramparts, which have been an Historic Monument since 1925. With the separate tower in the Town Hall gardens and the Renaissance gate, the ramparts make up the remainder of the old castle. The tower is named "Tour Hélène" in homage to Hélène de Fonsèque
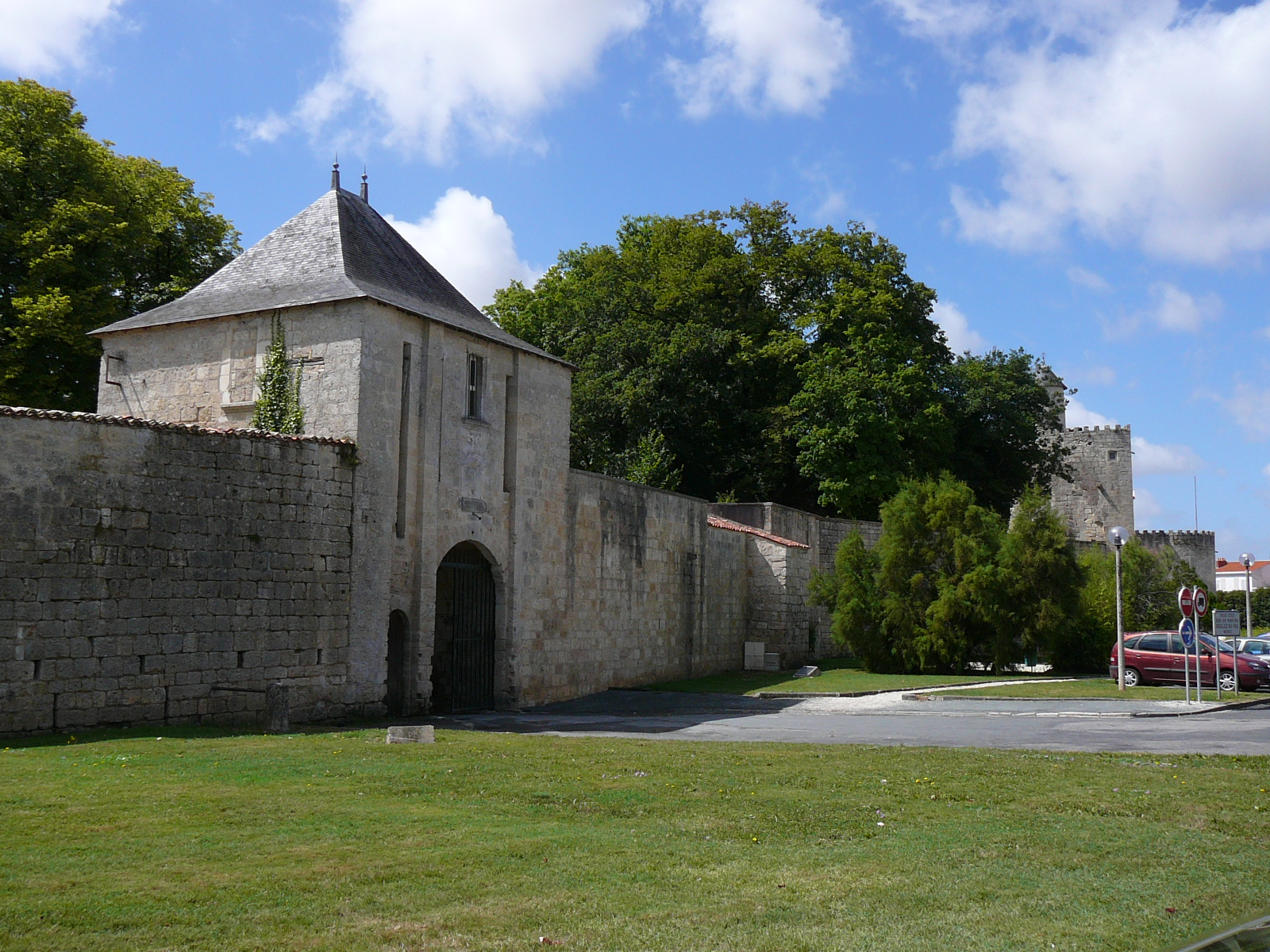
The ramparts and the city gate

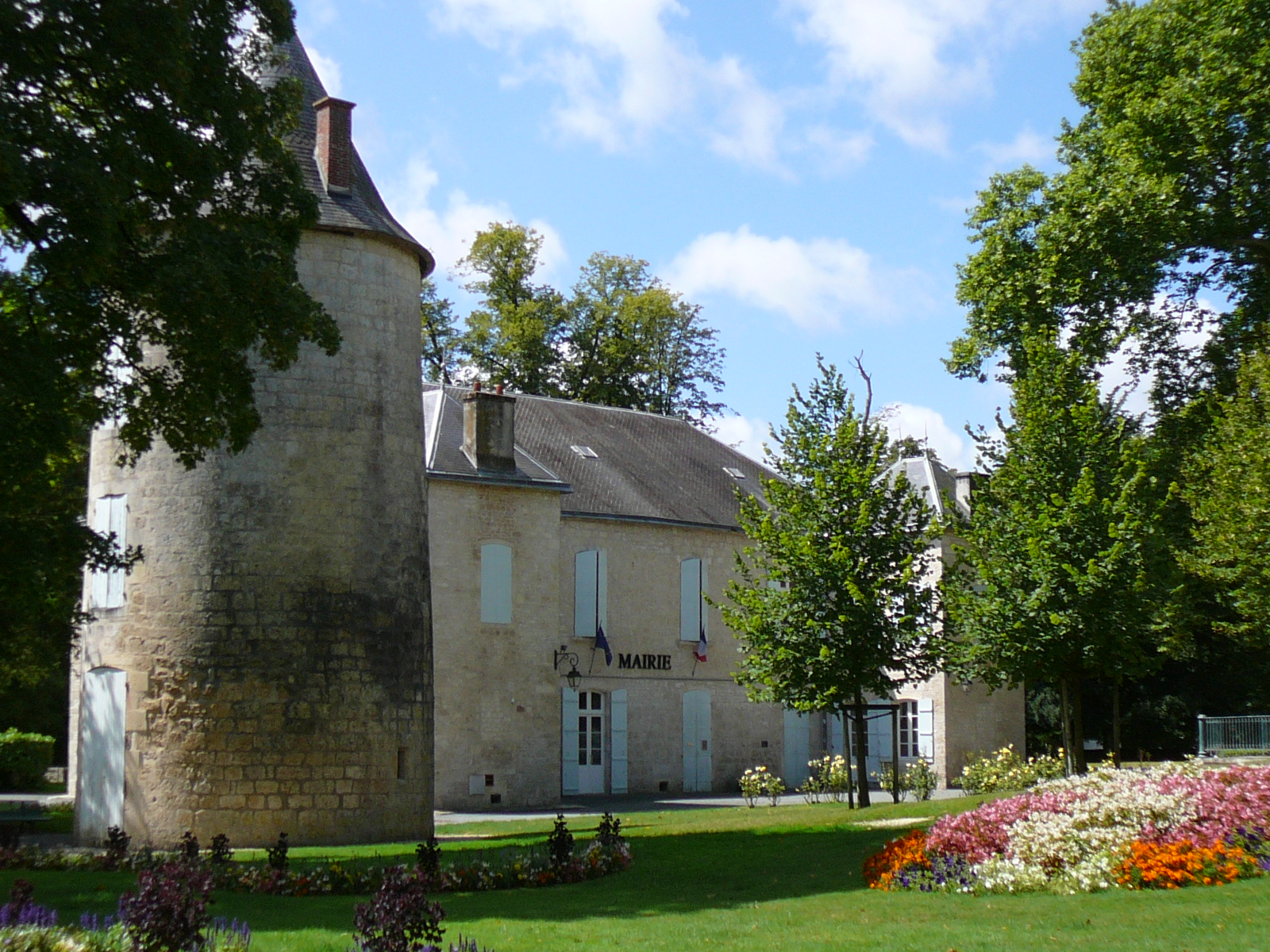
The town hall and the tower
- The old castle's grounds have been a classified site since 1828
- The town hall
- The city gate
- The 17th century Chapel of Saint Giles, a Monument Historique since 2004.

=== Industrial heritage ===
- The automotive factory of the Surgères Engineering Society (French: Société surgérienne de Constructions Mécaniques), built in 1918. This factory saw the development of the Poyaud business until it decamped to la Combe outside the town in 1974. It is near the station and had a branch line to the railway
- La caséinerie ("The Caseinery") of the Caseineries Co-operative (French: Union coopérative des caséineries, built in 1914. This factory produced casein. It is near the station and had a branch line to the railway
- La laiterie ("The creamery") built in 1894, with many additions as it expanded. It is in the direction of La Rochelle.

=== High street ===
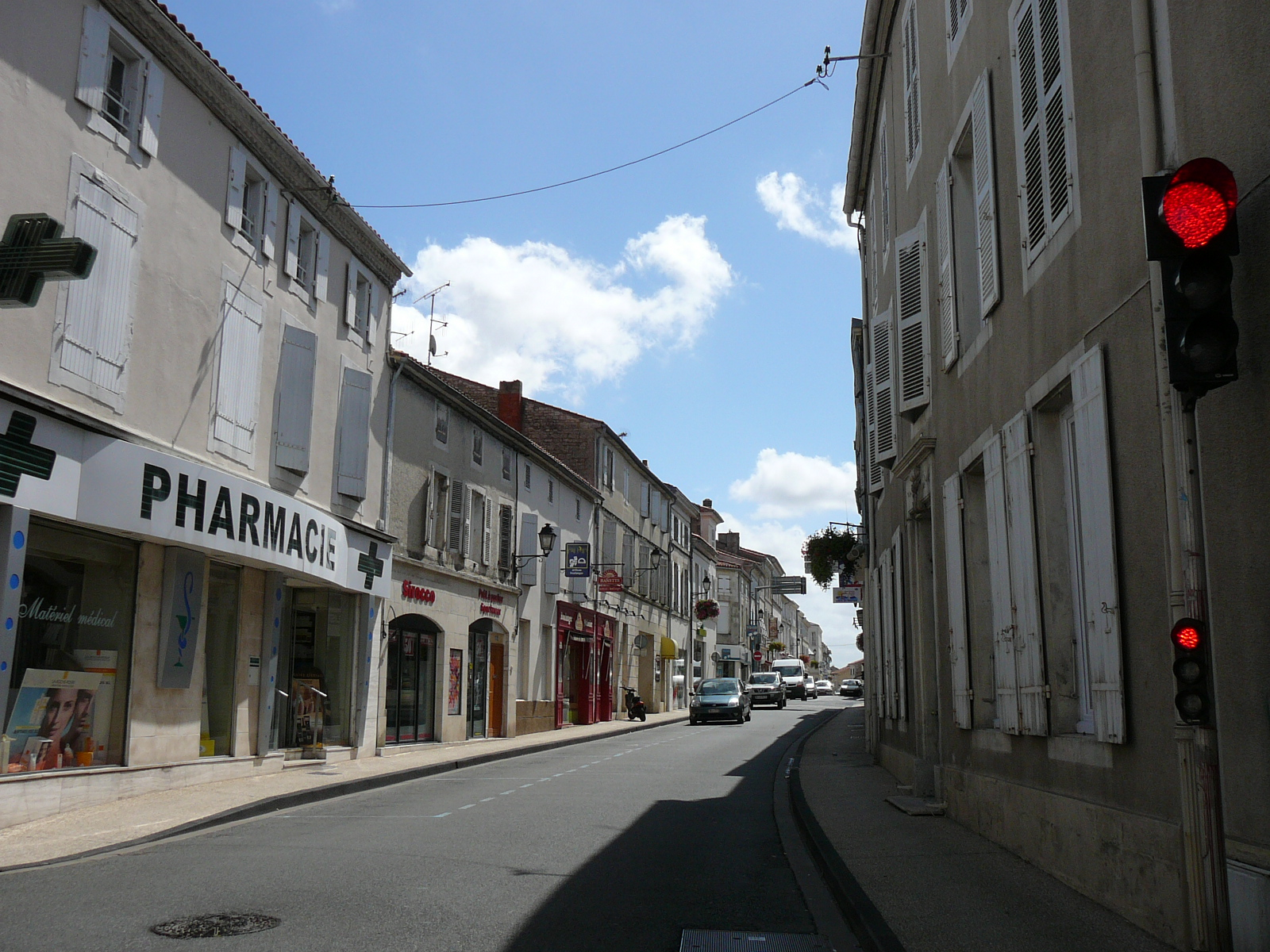
rue Audry de Puyravault

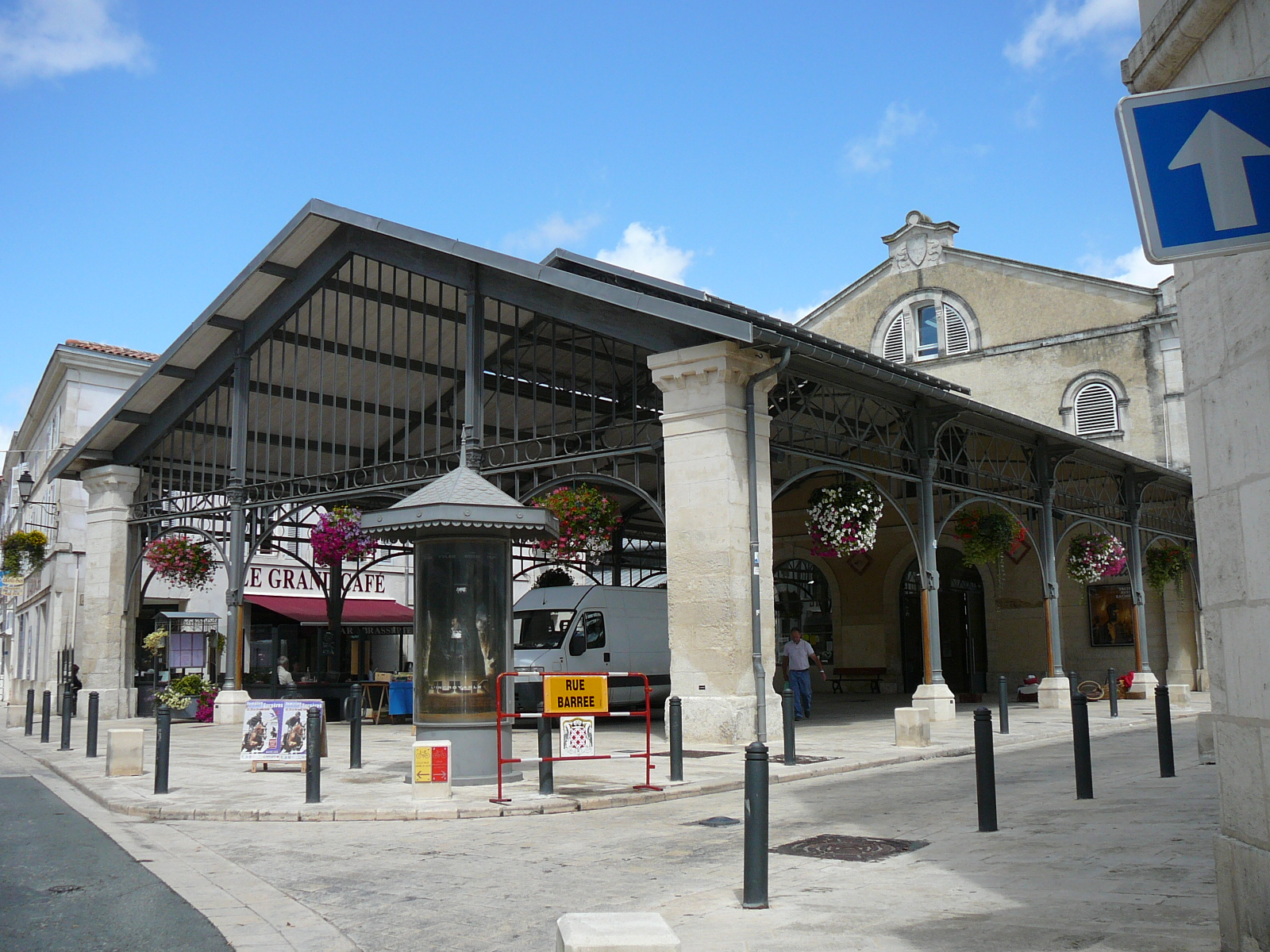
Covered market

== Geography ==
=== Surrounding communes ===
To the north lies the town of Saint-Georges-du-Bois, to the northwest Puyravault and Vouhé, to the west Péré, to the southwest Saint-Germain-de-Marencennes, to the south Vandré, to the southeast Breuil-la-Réorte, to the east Saint-Mard, and to the northeast Saint-Saturnin-du-Bois.

=== Location ===
Surgères is in the north of the department of Charente-Maritime, equidistant from the towns of Niort, La Rochelle, Rochefort and Saint-Jean-d'Angély. The village is south of the Marais Poitevin and east of the ancient province of Aunis.

=== Hydrography ===
The town's name came from the Gères, the stream that runs through it. It empties into the Devise, which flows into the Charente.

=== Climate ===
Surgères has a temperate climate but in December 1999, like all of the department, was hit by the second European windstorm of the season, codenamed Martin.

=== Transport ===
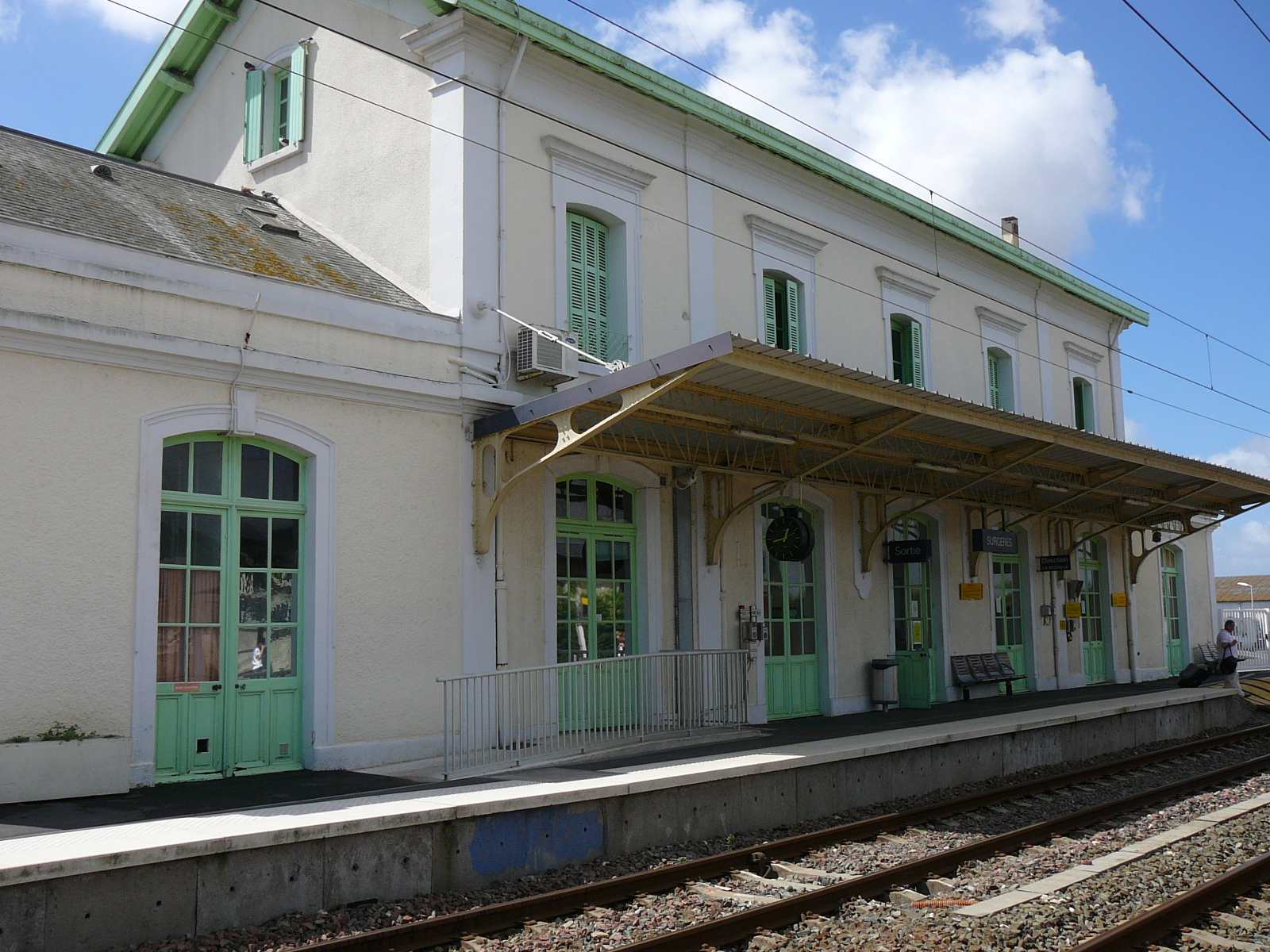
Surgères railway station

The A10 autoroute gives access at Exit 33 (Niort-La Rochelle) to the northeast of the town and Exit 34 (Saint-Jean-d'Angély) to the southeast.

The old Route nationale 11 (RN11) passes through the town. This road, reclassified to Route Départementale 911, connects Mauzé-sur-le-Mignon to Rochefort. Route nationale 139, running from La Rochelle to Périgueux, passed through Surgères and Angoulême and has been declassified to Route Départementale 939.

Surgères railway station connects the capital by TGV, and is also on the TER Nouvelle-Aquitaine regional railway network. It is part of the program of Gares en mouvement, which aims to modernise the largest stations of the SNCF (French National Railway Company).

The railway arrived in Surgères in 1857 thanks to the Chemin de fer de Paris à Orléans. The Poitiers–La Rochelle line was electrified in 1993 to allow the TGV to run up to La Rochelle railway station. The line from Surgères to Marans which was part of the Freycinet Plan can also be traced.

The closest airports are La Rochelle – Île de Ré Airport and Rochefort – Saint-Agnant Airport.

== Administration ==
List of Mayors
| Term | Name | Party | Occupation |
|---|---|---|---|
| 2014–2026 | Catherine Desprez | DVD | General councillor |
| 2001–2014 | Phillippe Guilloteau | UMP | General councillor |
| 1983–2001 | Jean-Guy Branger | UDF | |

The Canton of Surgères is part of the Charente-Maritime's 2nd constituency where the delegate is Frédérique Tuffnell.

== Population ==
Historical population

| Year | Pop. | ±% p.a. |
|---|---|---|
| 1793 | 1,387 | — |
| 1800 | 1,497 | +1.10% |
| 1806 | 1,589 | +1.00% |
| 1821 | 1,748 | +0.64% |
| 1831 | 1,979 | +1.25% |
| 1836 | 2,134 | +1.52% |
| 1841 | 2,153 | +0.18% |
| 1846 | 2,191 | +0.35% |
| 1851 | 2,942 | +6.07% |
| 1856 | 3,239 | +1.94% |
| 1861 | 3,289 | +0.31% |
| 1866 | 3,343 | +0.33% |
| 1872 | 3,850 | +2.38% |
| 1876 | 3,855 | +0.03% |
| 1881 | 3,784 | −0.37% |
| 1886 | 3,516 | −1.46% |
| 1891 | 3,375 | −0.82% |
| 1896 | 3,302 | −0.44% |
| 1901 | 3,235 | −0.41% |

| Year | Pop. | ±% p.a. |
|---|---|---|
| 1906 | 3,301 | +0.40% |
| 1911 | 3,579 | +1.63% |
| 1921 | 3,557 | −0.06% |
| 1926 | 3,550 | −0.04% |
| 1931 | 3,386 | −0.94% |
| 1936 | 3,388 | +0.01% |
| 1946 | 3,552 | +0.47% |
| 1954 | 3,823 | +0.92% |
| 1962 | 4,839 | +2.99% |
| 1968 | 5,644 | +2.60% |
| 1975 | 6,178 | +1.30% |
| 1982 | 6,175 | −0.01% |
| 1990 | 6,049 | −0.26% |
| 1999 | 6,051 | +0.00% |
| 2007 | 6,188 | +0.28% |
| 2012 | 6,581 | +1.24% |
| 2017 | 6,807 | +0.68% |
| 2023 | 6,897 | +0.22% |

Source: EHESS and INSEE (1968-2023)

== Economy ==
The town of Surgères is known for its activities in the food farming industry, especially milk processing. Of equal promininence is boilermaking and engineering.

=== Dairy industry ===
The town is principally known for its butter which has AOC designation "Beurre des Charentes" or "Beurre Charentes-Poitou". The "Glac" (French: Groupement des Laiteries Coopératives, "Group of Dairy Co-operatives") distribute many brands of butter, milk and cheese such as Bougon, Saint-Loup, Lescure, Surgères, Le Petit Vendéen and Mottin charentais.

With its brand Saint-Loup, the Glac is the shirt sponsor of the Chamois Niortais when they play at home, and has been a partner in the club for many years.

The town is also home to the Syndicat des Laiteries Charentes-Poitou, a syndicate that developed at the end of the 19th Century to get Charentes-Poitou butter to the shops of Paris in under 48 hours. The syndicate is a partner of the Surgères 48 Hour Race and appears on the shirt of the best climber.

The dairy industry was started by Eugène Biraud after the Phylloxera crisis, with the first co-operative created in 1888 in an old distillery at Chaillé, to the northwest of Surgères. In 1907, a dairy college completed the picture.

Training in the food industry is under the control of the French: Pôle de Formation ENILIA ENSMIC (École Nationale d'Industrie Laitière et des Industries Agroalimentaires et l'École Nationale Supérieure de La Meunerie et des Industries Céréalières ("Training policy of the National College of the Dairy and Food Industries and Higher National College of Milling and Cereals"). These groups provide training from granting new licences (theory and apprenticeship) onwards, with the aim of meeting the needs of employers. The college takes students from all over France, and foreigners. Research activities are conducted on behalf of companies. The college works with 2,500 companies in 80 countries.

=== Metallurgy industry ===
The engineering sector with Poyaud diesel engines became Société Alsacienne de Constructions Mécaniques, then Wärtsilä Diesel. The Surgères site produced Char Leclerc engines but also engines for railcars and locomotives, and marine engines. This technology is also used in the production of large electric generators for hospitals, industry and offices of large companies.

There are many other companies at this site, such as Sassaro (specialising in stainless steel for the dairy and pharmaceutical industries) and Saro (specialising in precision engineering).

=== Other sectors ===
The Sibcas slaughterhouse employs around fifty people and is near the creamery. Every October Surgères hosts a livestock show.

Despite there being a carpentry school there is no furniture industry. In the neighbouring commune of Saint-Germain-de-Marencennes there is the Sofec factory, owned by Teissa the kitchen designer.

=== Media ===
The town has two major media for the north of Charente-Maritime:

- Radio Hélène FM (Surgères 89 FM, Saint-Jean d'Angély 102.9 FM), a general radio station with local information. It is the organiser of the singing competition Les Voix Lactées ("Milky Voices").
- The newspaper L'hebdo de la Charente-Maritime ("Charente-Maritime Weekly"), published by Groupe Sud Ouest, which has many regional correspondents. It prints local information for the northern cantons of Charente-Maritime.

== Culture ==
=== Music ===
The Académie de Cuivres et Percussions ("Academy of brass and percussion") organises a festival each summer which lets artists get together in Surgères and the surrounding communes.

Since 2005, the summer Sérénade festival has been promoting stringed instruments with open-air concerts. This event is directed by Pierre Lénert, a violist and soloist in the orchestra of the Opéra national de Paris at the Opéra Bastille.

The band Les Verres Luisants ("The Shiny Glasses") was champion of France in 2007 and 2008. This band won a Palme d'Or in the 2008 festival at Condom, Gers and have long accompanied the town's rugby team.

== Facilities ==
=== Training ===
The Collège Hélène de Fonsèque is a professional school specialising in woodworking. There are also the School of the Pays d'Aunis and the dairy college of ENILIA-ENSMIC.

=== Research ===
As mentioned above, near to Saint-Pierre-d'Amilly is INRA's site for bird farming, snail farming and beekeeping.

== Sport ==
The town was named the Most Sporting Village in France (of fewer than 10,000 inhabitants) in 1987. The most popular sport is rugby.

=== Rugby ===
The Sporting Club Surgèrien was founded in 1912 and is in the Poitou-Charentes league. It is now in the French Championship, Federal Division 3. The club was champion of this division in 1997. The final took place in Graulhet against Solliès-Pont.

=== Athletics ===
The Surgères 48 Hour Race is an ultrarunning competition created in 1985. In 2009 it was won by Australian Martin Fryer, the 2008 world champion of 24-hour racing, and in 2008 by Ryoichi Sekiya. The 25th race, in 2010, took place from Friday 21 May to Sunday 23 May.

=== Showjumping ===
Showjumping in Surgères takes place every August. For the fifteenth meeting in 2008, it was one of the stages of Showjumping Grand National, with the best French showjumpers. Unfortunately the 2009 event was cancelled but it will return in 2010.

=== Motorsport ===
The Rallye d'Automne regularly has a show of its private collection on the Place du Château. In 2000 Yvan Muller won. He had previously trained to win the Andros Trophy which he won after a season in BTCC on British circuits.

== International relations ==
Surgères is twinned with:

- – Wipperfürth, North Rhine-Westphalia, Germany.

== Personalities ==
- Ernest Bersot, moral philosopher and French journalist, was born in Surgères.
- Jean Baptiste Cacault, a brigadier-general, was born at Surgères, injured in battle at Juterbock, and died after having an arm amputated.
- Raymond Couraud, gangster and WW2 hero
- Edmond de Fonsèques, Baron of Surgères, married to Hardouine, daughter of Pierre de Laval-Montmorency
- Jacques-Charles-François de La Perrière de Roiffé (1694 – 1776), doctor.
- Hervé Michelet, French trumpeter, conductor of the Académie de Cuivres et Percussions at Surgères.
- Clément Saunier, French trumpeter, student of the Académie de Cuivres et Percussions at Surgères.

== See also ==
- Communes of the Charente-Maritime department
