= Mottin charentais =

French soft double-cream cheese

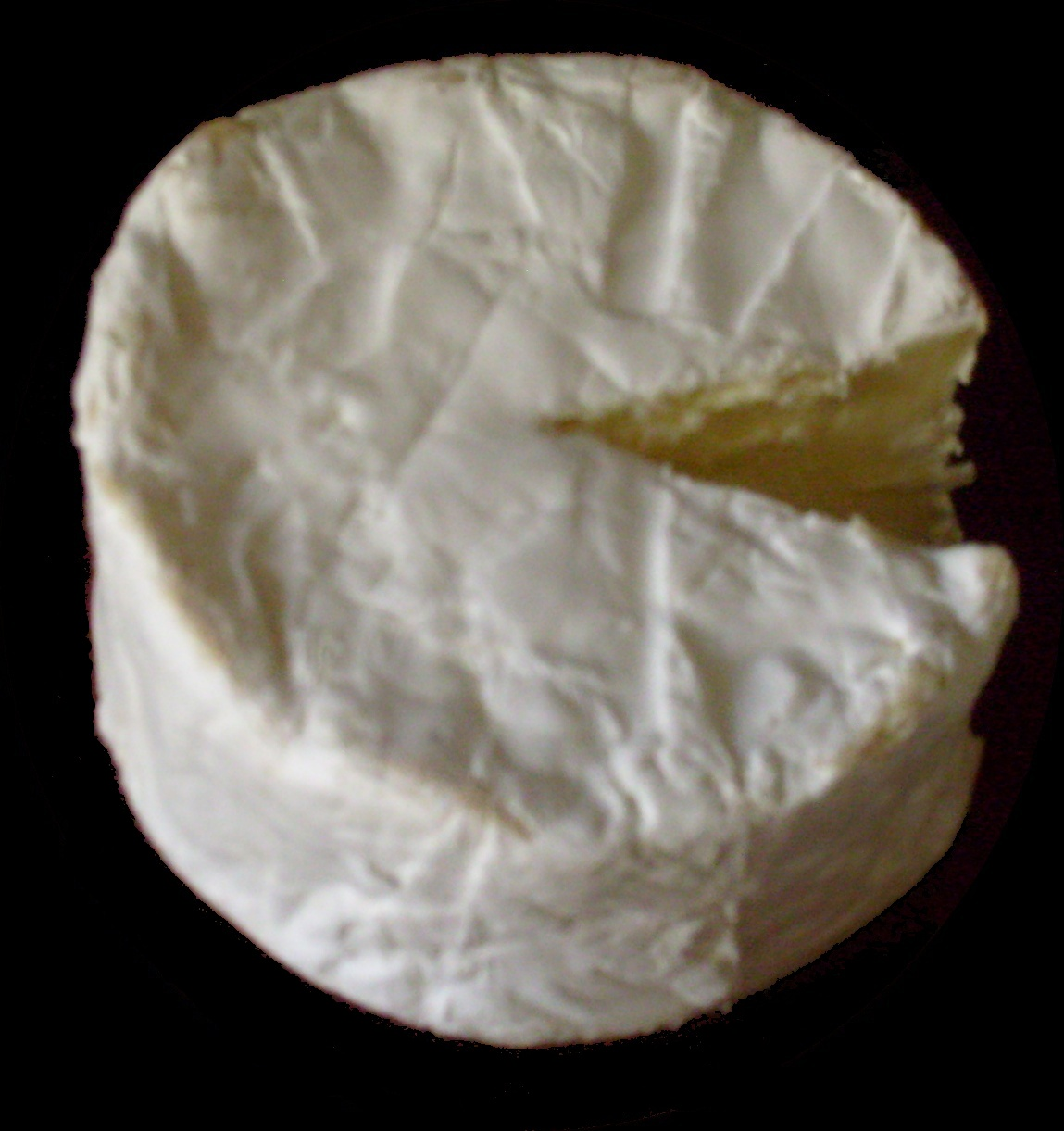
- Other names: Crottin charentais
- Country of origin: France
- Town: Saint-Saviol
- Source of milk: Cows
- Pasteurised: Yes
- Texture: Soft
- Fat content: 37%

Mottin charentais (French pronunciation: [mɔtɛ̃ ʃaʁɑ̃tɛ]), previously known as crottin charentais ([kʁɔtɛ̃ -]) is a French soft double-cream cheese made of pasteurized whole cow's milk, produced by Savencia Fromage & Dairy in the town of Saint-Saviol located within the Vienne department.

Its shape is cylindrical, with a height of 4.5 cm, a diameter of 8 cm and an average weight of 200g. It is packaged in paper. Its fat content is of 37% in the finished product and 65% when dehydrated. Its taste is creamy.

It was originally produced in the vicinity of the town of Surgères by the company Charentes Lait until 1936. There existed a version of the cheese made with goat milk called the trottin charentais.

== See also ==
- Cheese
