= Ardillières =

- Commune
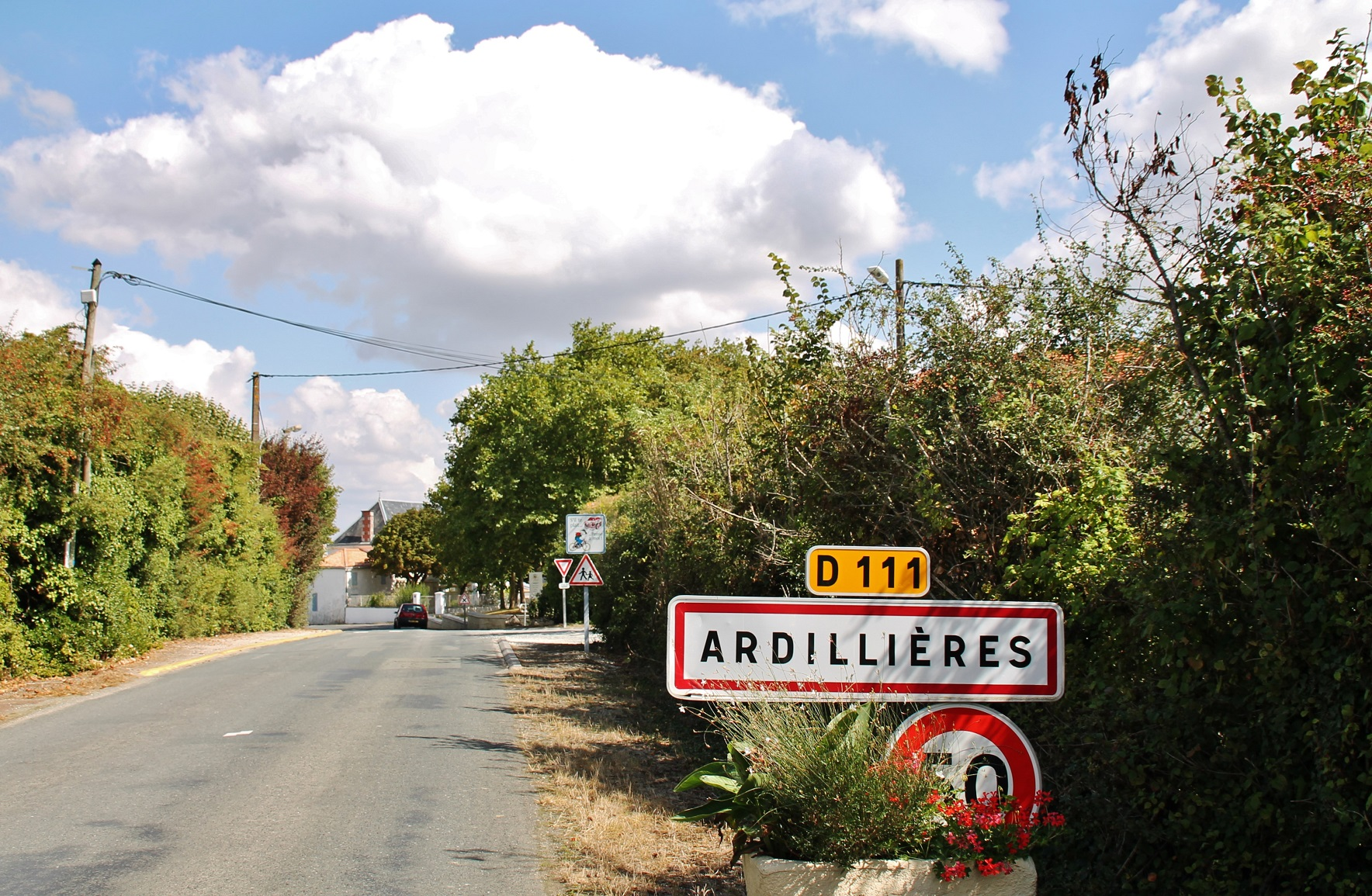
- The road into Ardillières

- Coat of arms
- Location of Ardillières
- Location within France Location within Nouvelle-Aquitaine
- Coordinates: 46°03′32″N 0°53′29″W
- Country: France
- Region: Nouvelle-Aquitaine
- Department: Charente-Maritime
- Arrondissement: Rochefort
- Canton: Surgères
- Intercommunality: Aunis Sud

Government
  - Mayor (2020–2026): Olivier Denechaud
- Area^{1}: 15.7 km^{2} (6.1 sq mi)
- Elevation: 17 m (56 ft)
- Highest elevation: 31 m (102 ft)
- Lowest elevation: 0 m (0 ft)
- Population (2023): 890
  - Density: 57/km^{2} (150/sq mi)
- Time zone: UTC+01:00 (CET)
  - Summer (DST): UTC+02:00 (CEST)
- INSEE/Postal code: 17018 /17290
- ^{1} French Land Register data, which excludes lakes, ponds, glaciers > 1 km^{2} (0.386 sq mi or 247 acres) and river estuaries.

Ardillières is a commune in the Charente-Maritime department in the Nouvelle-Aquitaine region of southwestern France.

== Geography ==
Ardillières is located some 25 km south-east of La Rochelle and 20 km east of Châtelaillon-Plage. Access to the commune is by the D111 road from Ciré-d'Aunis in the west passing through the commune and the village and continuing to the east. The D208 road also goes north-east from the village to join the D939 at Le Cher. The D205E2 also goes north-west from the village to Le Thou. Apart from the village there are also the hamlets of Les Perrieres, Toucherit, Villeneuve, and Bois des Mottes. The commune is entirely farmland apart from a few small patches of forest.

The southern portion of the commune is covered with a network of canals which link to the Charras Canal which crosses the south of the commune from west to east.

== Administration ==
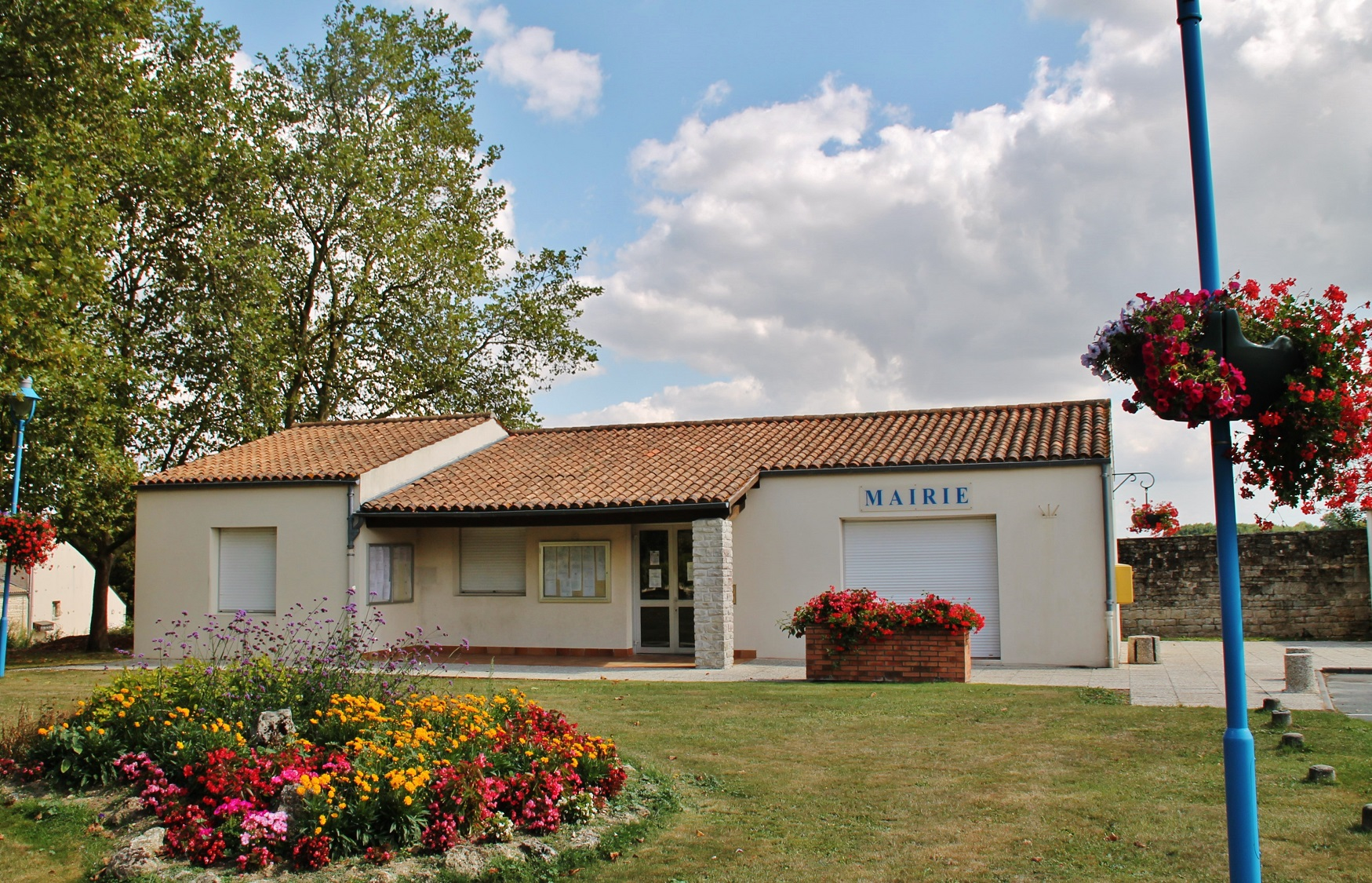
The Town Hall

List of Successive Mayors

From	To	Name	Party
1826	1830	Etienne Martin	
1971	2001	Guy Caquineau	ind.
2001	2020	Jean-Marie Targé	ind.
2020	2026	Olivier Denechaud	

== Demography ==
The inhabitants of the commune are known as Ardilliérois or Ardilliéroises in French.

Historical population

Year	Pop.	±% p.a.
1793	560	—
1821	496	−0.43%
1846	793	+1.89%
1872	850	+0.27%
1901	607	−1.15%
1926	502	−0.76%
1946	409	−1.02%
1962	471	+0.89%
1968	430	−1.51%

Year	Pop.	±% p.a.
1975	403	−0.92%
1982	456	+1.78%
1990	508	+1.36%
1999	555	+0.99%
2007	775	+4.26%
2012	818	+1.09%
2017	849	+0.75%
2023	890	+0.79%

Source: EHESS and INSEE

== Culture and heritage ==
=== Civil heritage ===
The commune has several sites and buildings that are registered as historical monuments:

- The Château d'Ardillières (14th century). There are two round towers. The 17th century lodging is surrounded by farm buildings of the same period and recent constructions. The medieval cellar is remarkable.
- The Pierre Levée Dolmen (Neolithic)
- The Pierre-Fouquerée Dolmen (Neolithic)

Other sites of interest

- The Charras Canal
- A Mill (Charles Goumard built it in the early 16th century). It contains a Lintel (1508) which is registered as an historical object.
- A Wind Farm
- Rural cottages

=== Religious heritage ===
The Parish Church of Saint Peter (11th century) is registered as an historical monument. The Church has a Bronze Bell (1635) which is registered as an historical object.

=== Ardillières Picture Gallery ===
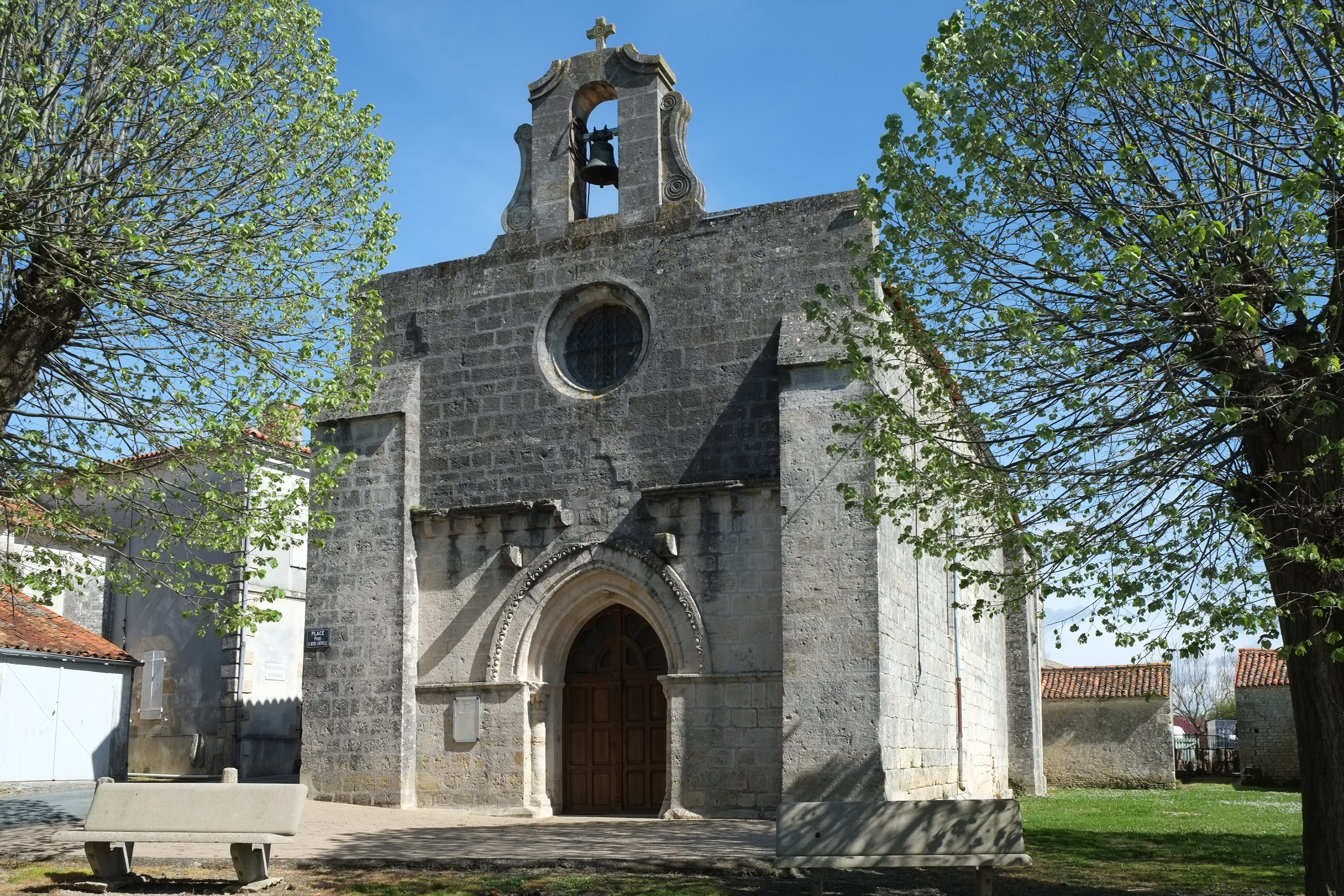
The Church of Saint Peter

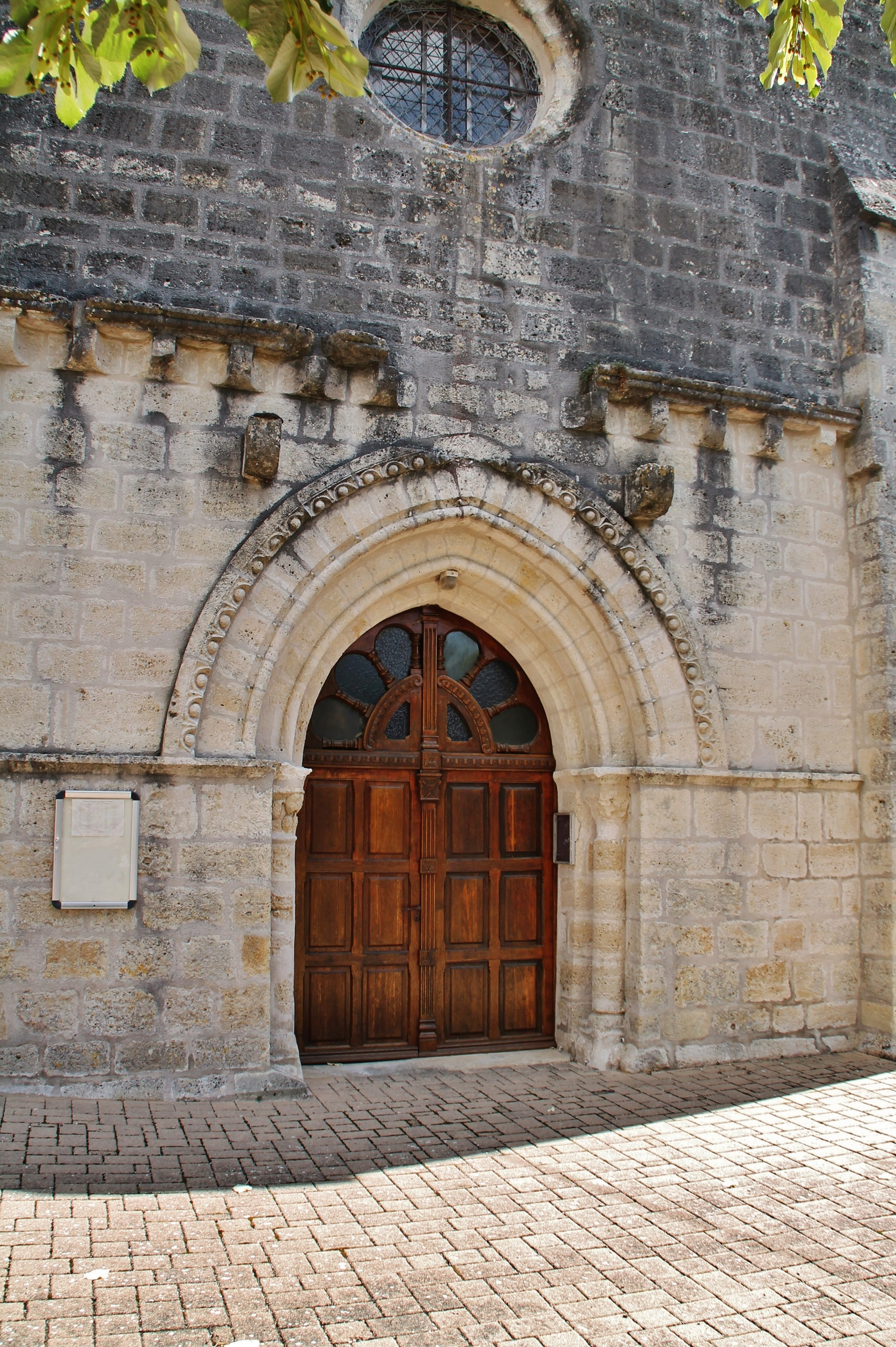
The entrance to the church

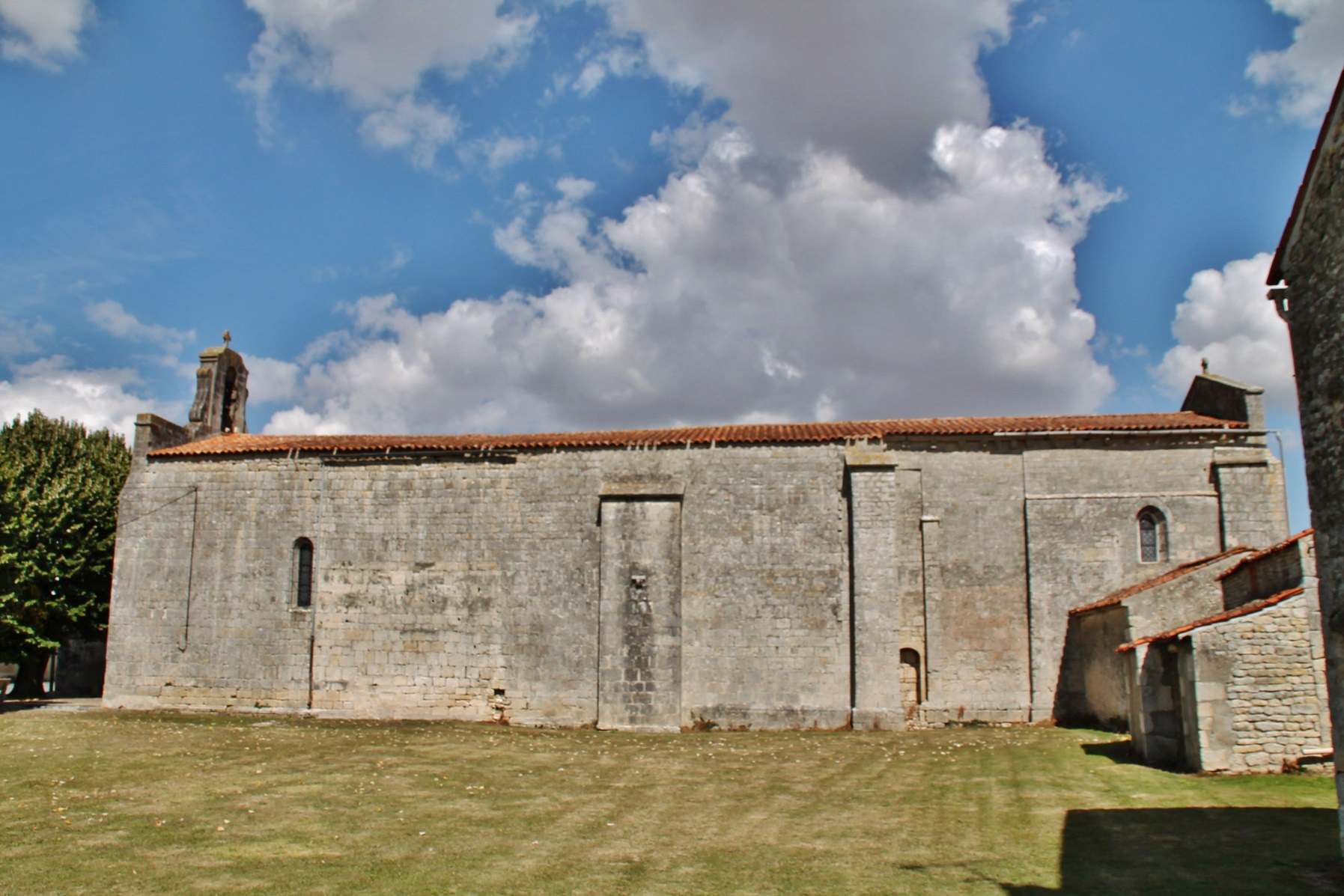
The side of the church

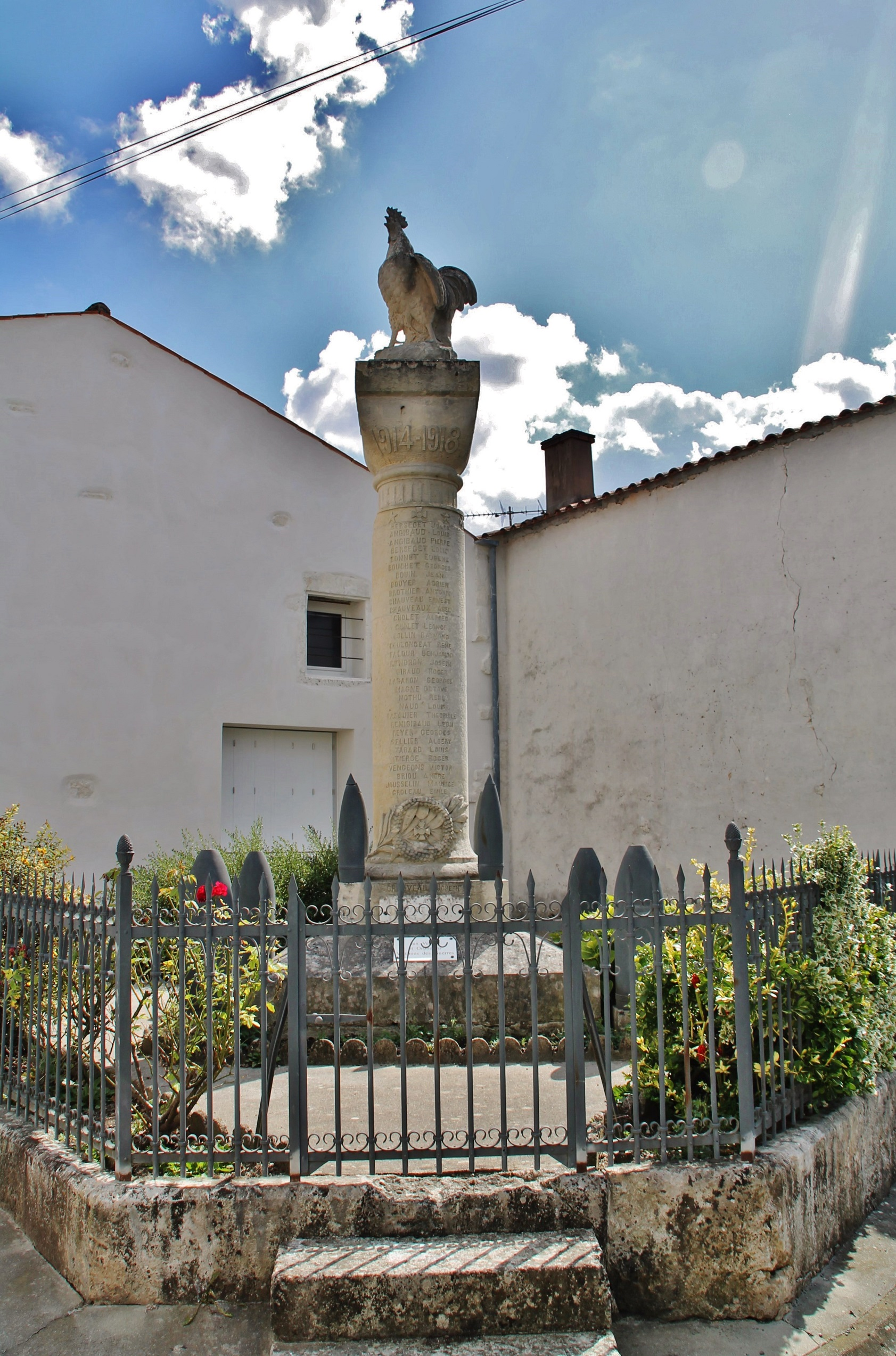
The War Memorial

== Notable people linked to the commune ==
- Pierre Le Moyne d'Iberville, Squire of Iberville and Ardillières, founder of the Louisiana colony in 1700 where he built the Fort of Biloxi.

== See also ==
- Communes of the Charente-Maritime department
