= Saint-Pierre-d'Amilly =

- Commune
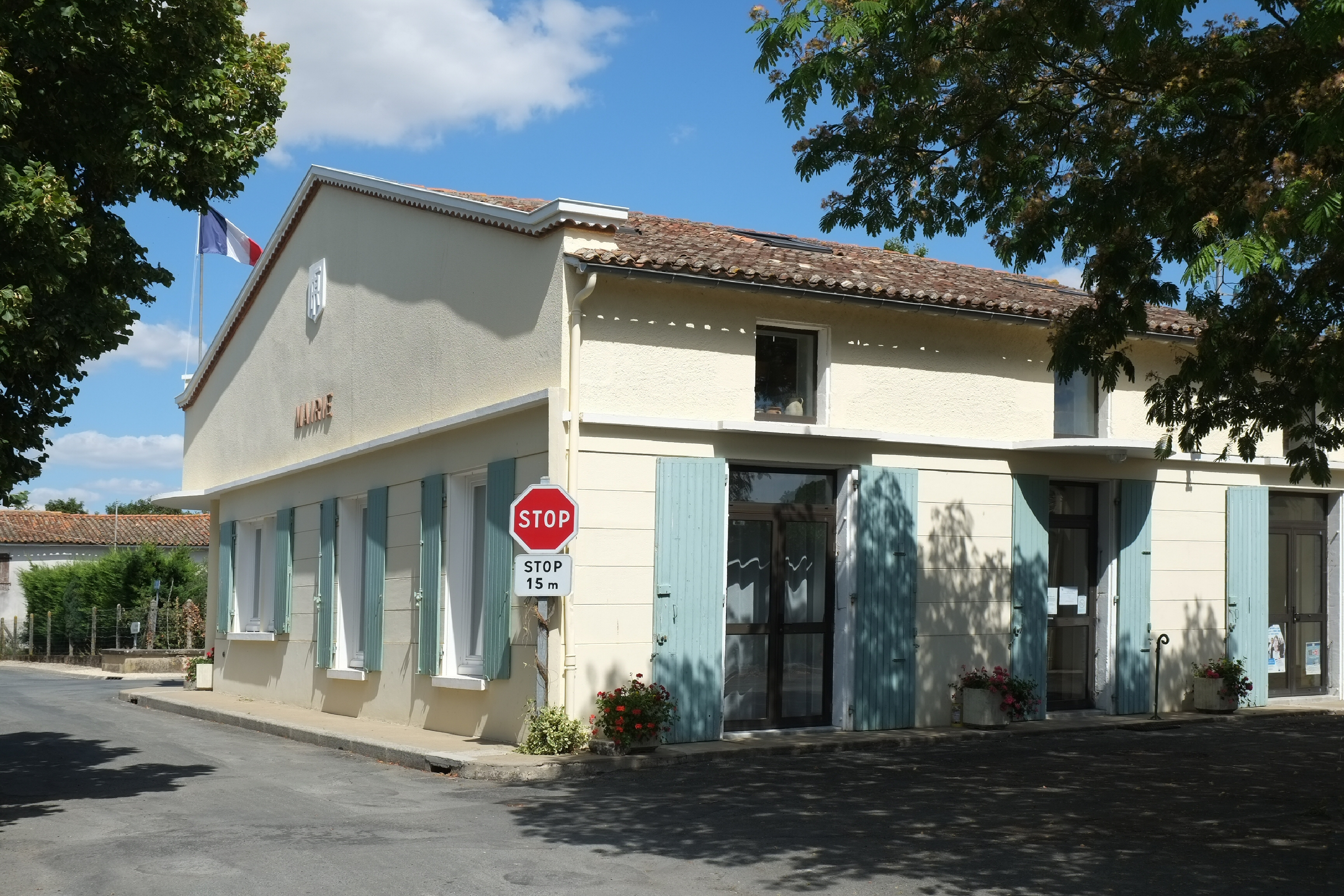
- The town hall in Saint-Pierre-d'Amilly
- Location of Saint-Pierre-d'Amilly
- Location within France Location within Nouvelle-Aquitaine
- Coordinates: 46°10′04″N 0°41′12″W
- Country: France
- Region: Nouvelle-Aquitaine
- Department: Charente-Maritime
- Arrondissement: Rochefort
- Canton: Surgères

Government
  - Mayor (2020–2026): Philippe Bodet
- Area^{1}: 19.81 km^{2} (7.65 sq mi)
- Elevation: 25 m (82 ft)
- Highest elevation: 69 m (226 ft)
- Lowest elevation: 11 m (36 ft)
- Population (2023): 575
  - Density: 29.0/km^{2} (75.2/sq mi)
- Demonym: Pierritains
- Time zone: UTC+01:00 (CET)
  - Summer (DST): UTC+02:00 (CEST)
- INSEE/Postal code: 17382 /17700
- ^{1} French Land Register data, which excludes lakes, ponds, glaciers > 1 km^{2} (0.386 sq mi or 247 acres) and river estuaries.

Saint-Pierre-d'Amilly is a commune in the Charente-Maritime department in southwestern France.

== Geography ==
The village of Charente-Maritime is at the extreme northeast of the Département, 3 km (2 mi) from the Département of Deux-Sèvres (79) and the village of Mauzé-sur-le-Mignon, and 10 km (6 mi) from Surgères, the seat of the canton.

== Places and monuments ==
- Church of St Paul, built in roughcast limestone in 1871, to replace two older churches that had been ruined by the wars that ravaged the region.
- The commune also has a war memorial, near the Church of St Paul.

== Population ==
Historical population
Year	Pop.	±% p.a.
1968	414	—
1975	366	−1.75%
1982	390	+0.91%
1990	409	+0.60%
1999	386	−0.64%
2007	434	+1.48%
2012	502	+2.95%
2017	529	+1.05%
2023	575	+1.40%
Source: INSEE

== Economy ==
The commune is home to the Magernaud site of the National Institute for Agricultural Research (INRA), specialising in the improvement of aviculture (bird farming), heliciculture (snail farming) and apiculture (beekeeping). This site also houses an outpost of GEVES, the Groupe d'étude et de contrôle des variétés et des semences ("Group for the study and control of varieties and seeds"), a seedbank and plant selection institution which works on the homologation of new vegetable varieties. It collaborates also with French: ARVALIS - Institut du végétal ("ARVALIS - Institute of Vegetation").

== See also ==
- Communes of the Charente-Maritime department
