= Surgères 48 Hour Race =

Sports competition

- Date: May
- Location: Surgères, France
- Event type: Track
- Distance: 48 hour race
- Established: 1985; 41 years ago
- Course records: M: 473,495 m Yiannis Kouros Greece (1996); F: 397,103 m Sumie Inagaki Japan (2010)
- Website: http://www.48heures-surgeres.net/

The Surgères 48 hour race is perhaps the most significant event in the current ultrarunning calendar in this time-frame. Begun in 1985 with the inspiration of Jean-Gilles Boussiquet it takes place in Surgères, France. An invitation only event, it has been host to many world records at the 48 hour distance.

The competition did not take place in 1999 and since 2011.
