= Saint-Macoux =

- Part of Val-de-Comporté
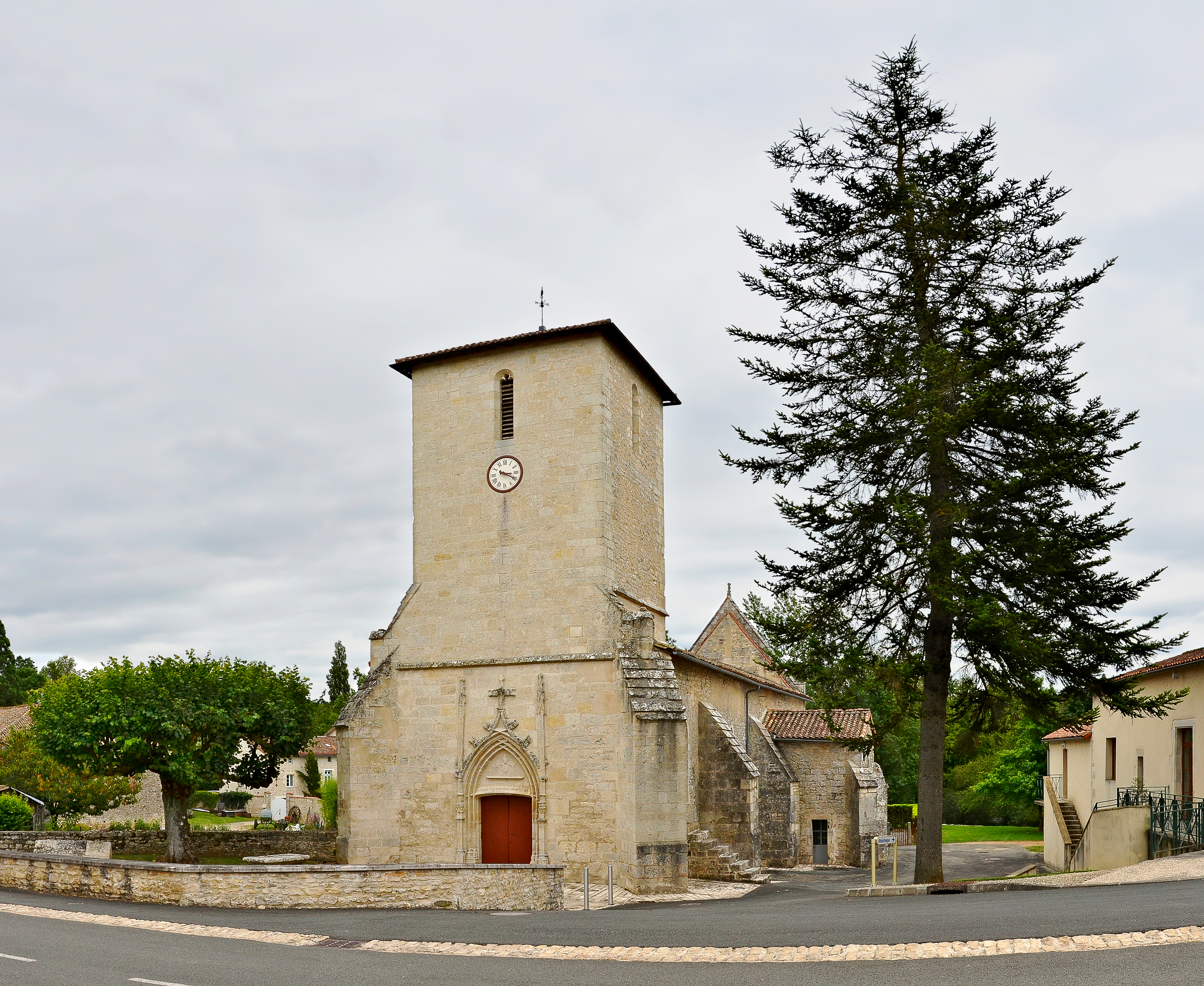
- The church in Saint-Macoux
- Location of Saint-Macoux
- Location within France Location within Nouvelle-Aquitaine
- Coordinates: 46°07′06″N 0°14′02″E
- Country: France
- Region: Nouvelle-Aquitaine
- Department: Vienne
- Arrondissement: Montmorillon
- Canton: Civray
- Commune: Val-de-Comporté
- Area^{1}: 10.68 km^{2} (4.12 sq mi)
- Elevation: 124 m (407 ft)
- Highest elevation: 144 m (472 ft)
- Lowest elevation: 96 m (315 ft)
- Population (2021): 478
  - Density: 44.8/km^{2} (116/sq mi)
- Time zone: UTC+01:00 (CET)
  - Summer (DST): UTC+02:00 (CEST)
- Postal code: 86400
- ^{1} French Land Register data, which excludes lakes, ponds, glaciers > 1 km^{2} (0.386 sq mi or 247 acres) and river estuaries.

Saint-Macoux (French pronunciation: [sɛ̃ maku]) is a former commune in the Vienne department in the Nouvelle-Aquitaine region in western France. On 1 January 2024, it was merged into the new commune of Val-de-Comporté.

== See also ==
- Communes of the Vienne department
