= Canton of Surgères =

Coordinates: 46.11°N 0.75°W

The canton of Surgères is an administrative division of the Charente-Maritime department, western France. Its borders were modified at the French canton reorganisation which came into effect in March 2015. Its seat is in Surgères.

It consists of the following communes:

1. Aigrefeuille-d'Aunis
2. Ardillières
3. Ballon
4. Breuil-la-Réorte
5. Chambon
6. Ciré-d'Aunis
7. Forges
8. Landrais
9. Marsais
10. Puyravault
11. Saint-Georges-du-Bois
12. Saint-Mard
13. Saint-Pierre-d'Amilly
14. Saint-Pierre-la-Noue
15. Saint-Saturnin-du-Bois
16. Surgères
17. Le Thou
18. Virson
19. Vouhé
