= Marsais =

- Commune
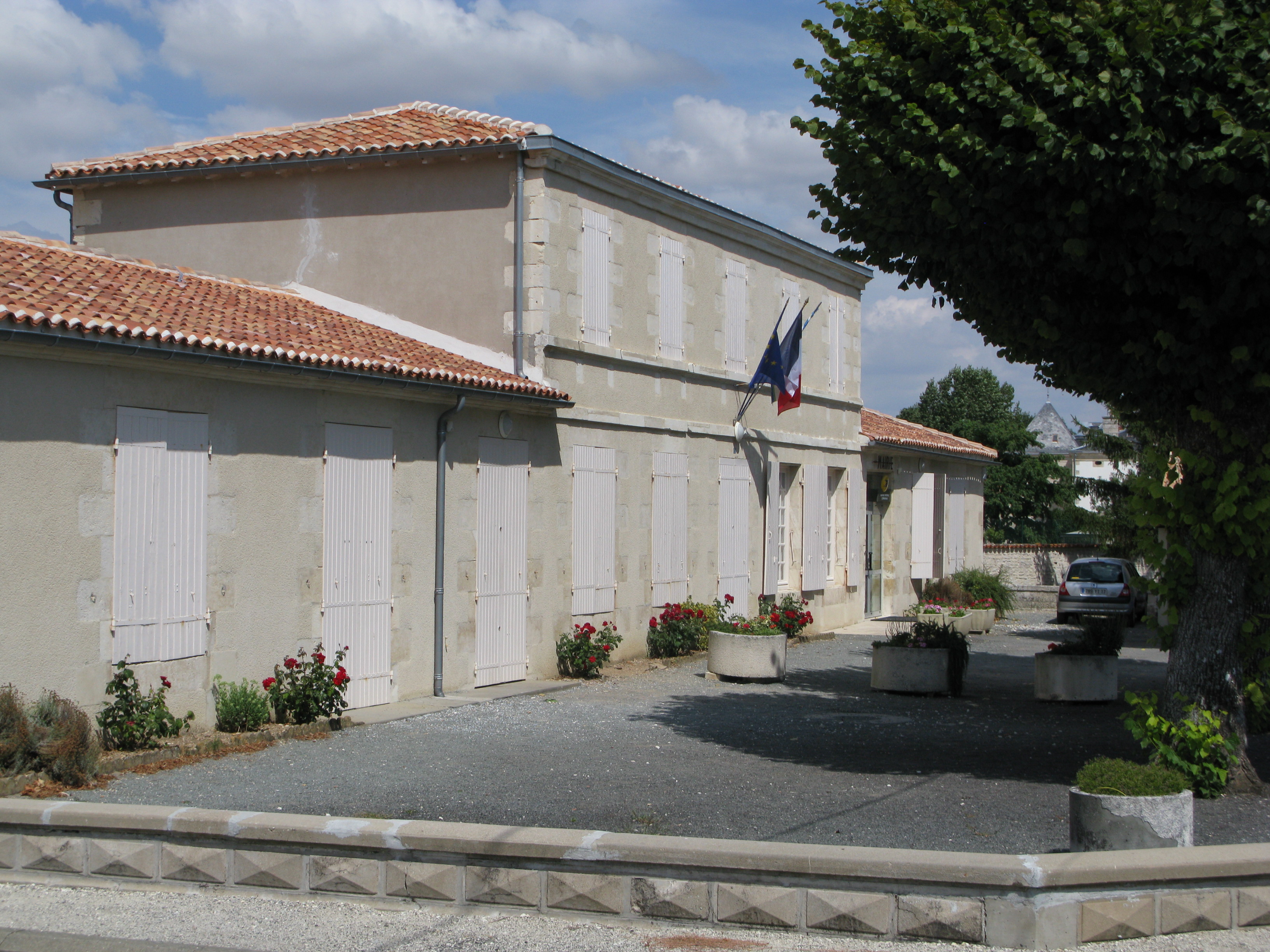
- Town hall
- Location of Marsais
- Location within France Location within Nouvelle-Aquitaine
- Coordinates: 46°07′35″N 0°35′54″W
- Country: France
- Region: Nouvelle-Aquitaine
- Department: Charente-Maritime
- Arrondissement: Rochefort
- Canton: Surgères

Government
  - Mayor (2020–2026): Steve Gabet
- Area^{1}: 23.98 km^{2} (9.26 sq mi)
- Elevation: 40 m (130 ft)
- Highest elevation: 82 m (269 ft)
- Lowest elevation: 23 m (75 ft)
- Population (2023): 981
  - Density: 40.9/km^{2} (106/sq mi)
- Time zone: UTC+01:00 (CET)
  - Summer (DST): UTC+02:00 (CEST)
- INSEE/Postal code: 17221 /17700
- ^{1} French Land Register data, which excludes lakes, ponds, glaciers > 1 km^{2} (0.386 sq mi or 247 acres) and river estuaries.

Marsais (French pronunciation: [maʁsɛ]) is a commune in the Charente-Maritime department in southwestern France. It also has mayoral jurisdiction over two local communes L'Hopiteau (sometimes L'Hopiteaux) and Boisse.

== Population ==
Historical population
Year	Pop.	±% p.a.
1968	870	—
1975	748	−2.14%
1982	713	−0.68%
1990	702	−0.19%
1999	785	+1.25%
2007	868	+1.26%
2012	911	+0.97%
2017	922	+0.24%
2023	981	+1.04%
Source: INSEE

== Sports ==
Despite the area being small in both geographic and demographic senses, there is a local football team, playing home games at 'Le Chat d'Eau' complex. There is a bar, Le Marsaisian. which is well known in the local region for hosting pool tournaments and Baby Foot (table football) championships.

== See also ==
- Communes of the Charente-Maritime department
