= Val-de-Comporté =

- Commune
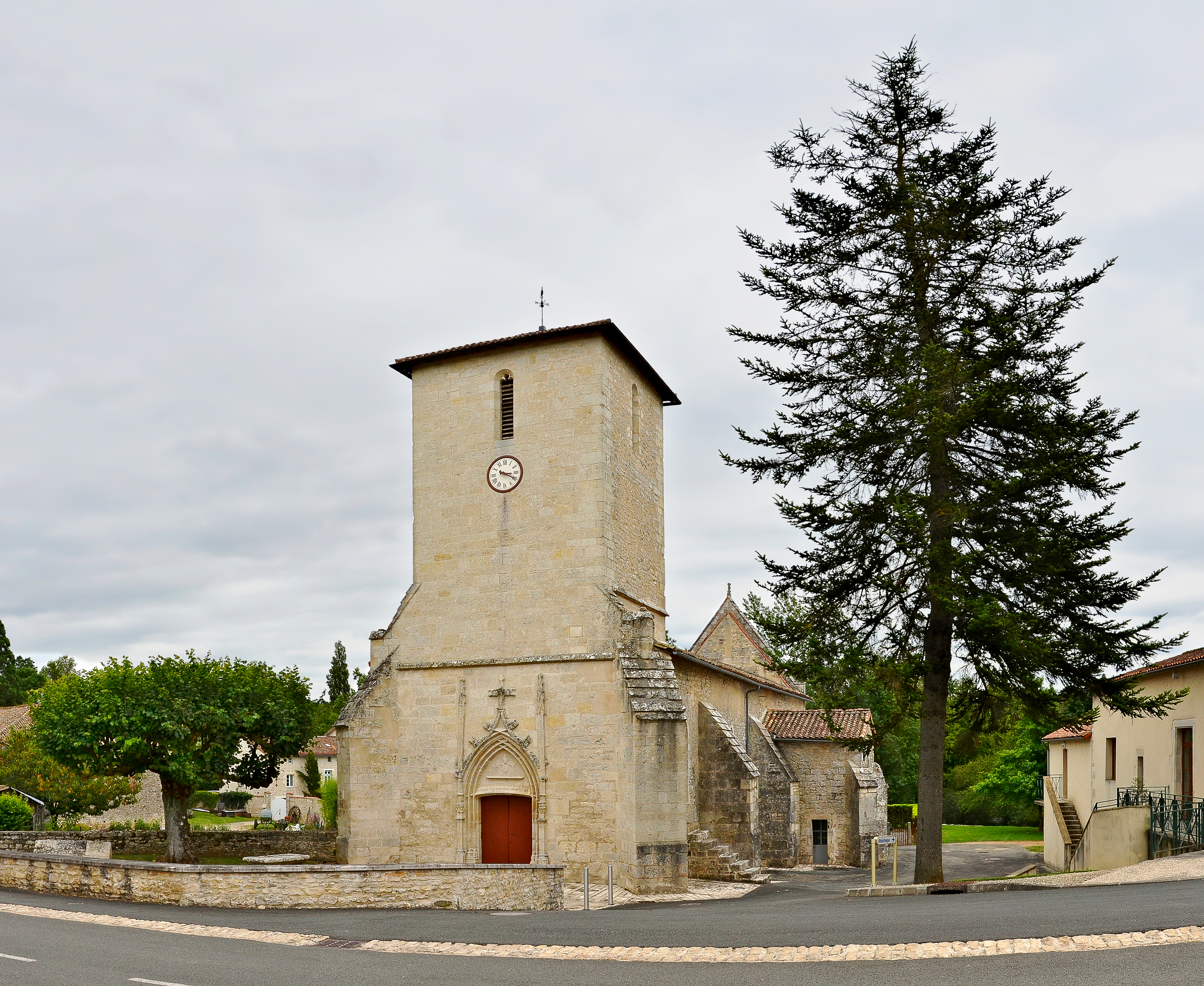
- Location of Val-de-Comporté
- Location within France Location within Nouvelle-Aquitaine
- Coordinates: 46°8′1″N 0°14′38″E
- Country: France
- Region: Nouvelle-Aquitaine
- Department: Vienne
- Arrondissement: Montmorillon
- Canton: Civray
- Intercommunality: Civraisien en Poitou

Government
  - Mayor (2024–2026): Jean-Pierre Bernard
- Area^{1}: 21.49 km^{2} (8.30 sq mi)
- Highest elevation: 144 m (472 ft)
- Lowest elevation: 96 m (315 ft)
- Population (2023): 999
  - Density: 46.5/km^{2} (120/sq mi)
- Time zone: UTC+01:00 (CET)
  - Summer (DST): UTC+02:00 (CEST)
- INSEE/Postal code: 86247 /86400
- ^{1} French Land Register data, which excludes lakes, ponds, glaciers > 1 km^{2} (0.386 sq mi or 247 acres) and river estuaries.

Val-de-Comporté (French pronunciation: [val də kɔ̃pɔʁte]) is a commune in the Vienne department in the Nouvelle-Aquitaine region in western France. It was formed on 1 January 2024, with the merger of Saint-Macoux and Saint-Saviol.

== History ==
On 1 January 2024, Saint-Macoux and Saint-Saviol merged to create the new commune of Val-de-Comporté.

== Geography ==
The new commune of Val-de-Comporté is located in the south of the Vienne department, on the border of Deux-Sèvres, in the small agricultural region of "Terres rouge à châtaigniers". It is located 50.6 km (31.4 mi) from Poitiers, prefecture of the department, 59 km (37 mi) from Montmorillon, the sub-prefecture, and 5.5 km (3.4 mi) from Civray, capital of the eponymous canton on which the commune depends. since its creation. The closest communes are Saint-Pierre-d'Exideuil (2.8 km (1.7 mi)), Voulême (3.7 km (2.3 mi)), Saint-Gaudent (4 km (2.5 mi)), Limalonges (5.1 km (3.2 mi)), Linazay (5.3 km (3.3 mi)) and Montalembert (7.4 km (4.6 mi)).

== See also ==
- Communes of the Vienne department
