= Saint-Saturnin-du-Bois =

- Commune
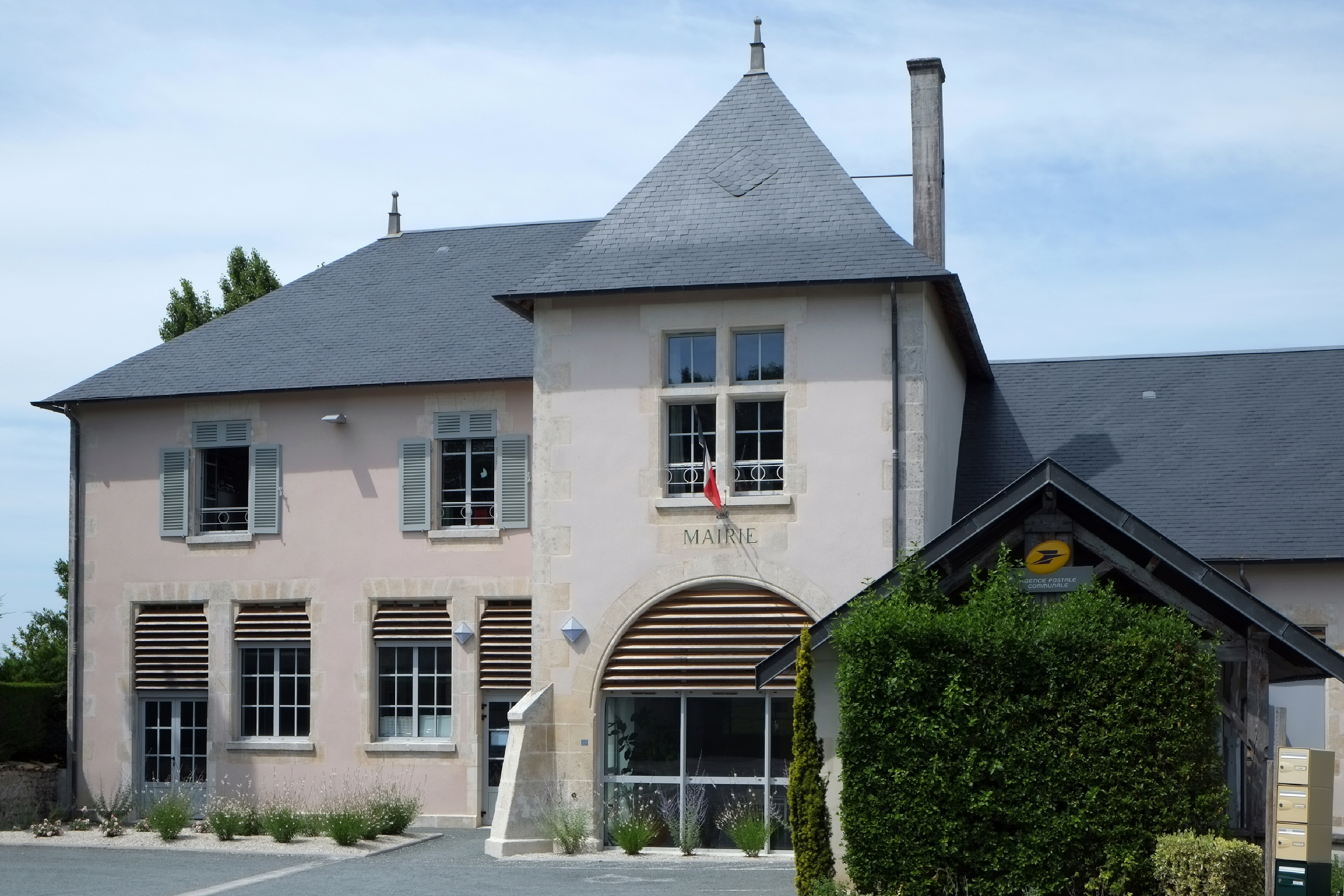
- The town hall in Saint-Saturnin-du-Bois
- Location of Saint-Saturnin-du-Bois
- Location within France Location within Nouvelle-Aquitaine
- Coordinates: 46°08′28″N 0°40′11″W
- Country: France
- Region: Nouvelle-Aquitaine
- Department: Charente-Maritime
- Arrondissement: Rochefort
- Canton: Surgères

Government
  - Mayor (2020–2026): Didier Barreau
- Area^{1}: 25.21 km^{2} (9.73 sq mi)
- Elevation: 50 m (160 ft)
- Highest elevation: 79 m (259 ft)
- Lowest elevation: 14 m (46 ft)
- Population (2023): 915
  - Density: 36.3/km^{2} (94.0/sq mi)
- Time zone: UTC+01:00 (CET)
  - Summer (DST): UTC+02:00 (CEST)
- INSEE/Postal code: 17394 /17700
- ^{1} French Land Register data, which excludes lakes, ponds, glaciers > 1 km^{2} (0.386 sq mi or 247 acres) and river estuaries.

Saint-Saturnin-du-Bois (French pronunciation: [sɛ̃ satyʁnɛ̃ dy bwa]) is a commune in the Charente-Maritime department, southwestern France.

== Population ==
Historical population
Year	Pop.	±% p.a.
1968	707	—
1975	648	−1.24%
1982	642	−0.13%
1990	685	+0.81%
1999	746	+0.95%
2007	845	+1.57%
2012	865	+0.47%
2017	891	+0.59%
2023	915	+0.44%
Source: INSEE

== See also ==
- Communes of the Charente-Maritime department
