= Saint-Saviol =

- Part of Val-de-Comporté
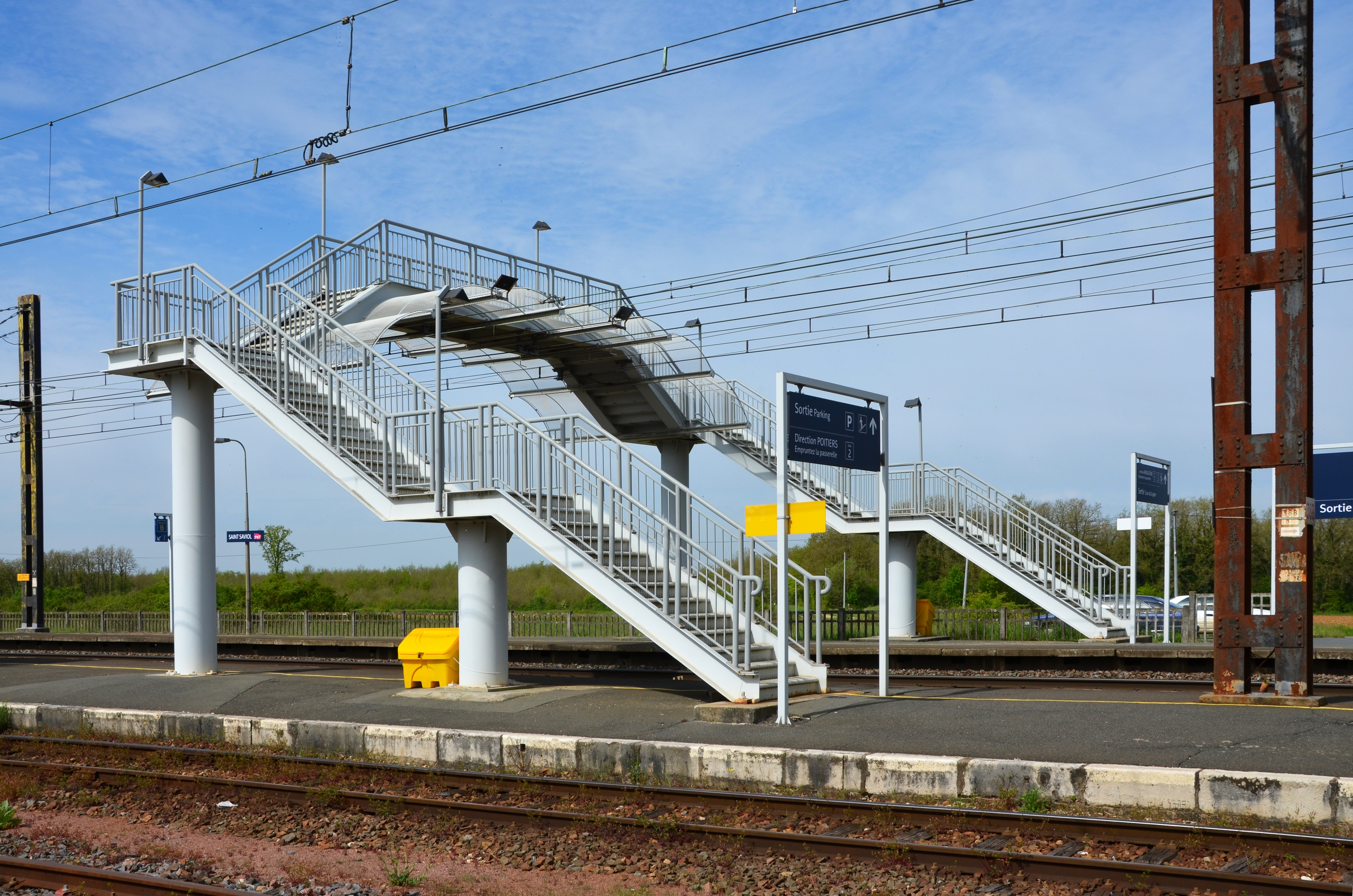
- Location of Saint-Saviol
- Location within France Location within Nouvelle-Aquitaine
- Coordinates: 46°08′01″N 0°14′38″E
- Country: France
- Region: Nouvelle-Aquitaine
- Department: Vienne
- Arrondissement: Montmorillon
- Canton: Civray
- Commune: Val-de-Comporté
- Area^{1}: 10.81 km^{2} (4.17 sq mi)
- Highest elevation: 143 m (469 ft)
- Lowest elevation: 97 m (318 ft)
- Population (2021): 536
  - Density: 49.6/km^{2} (128/sq mi)
- Time zone: UTC+01:00 (CET)
  - Summer (DST): UTC+02:00 (CEST)
- Postal code: 86400
- ^{1} French Land Register data, which excludes lakes, ponds, glaciers > 1 km^{2} (0.386 sq mi or 247 acres) and river estuaries.

Saint-Saviol (French pronunciation: [sɛ̃ savjɔl]) is a former commune in the Vienne department in the Nouvelle-Aquitaine region in western France. On 1 January 2024, it was merged into the new commune of Val-de-Comporté.

== See also ==
- Communes of the Vienne department
