= Saint-Georges-du-Bois, Charente-Maritime =

Saint-Georges-du-Bois
- Commune
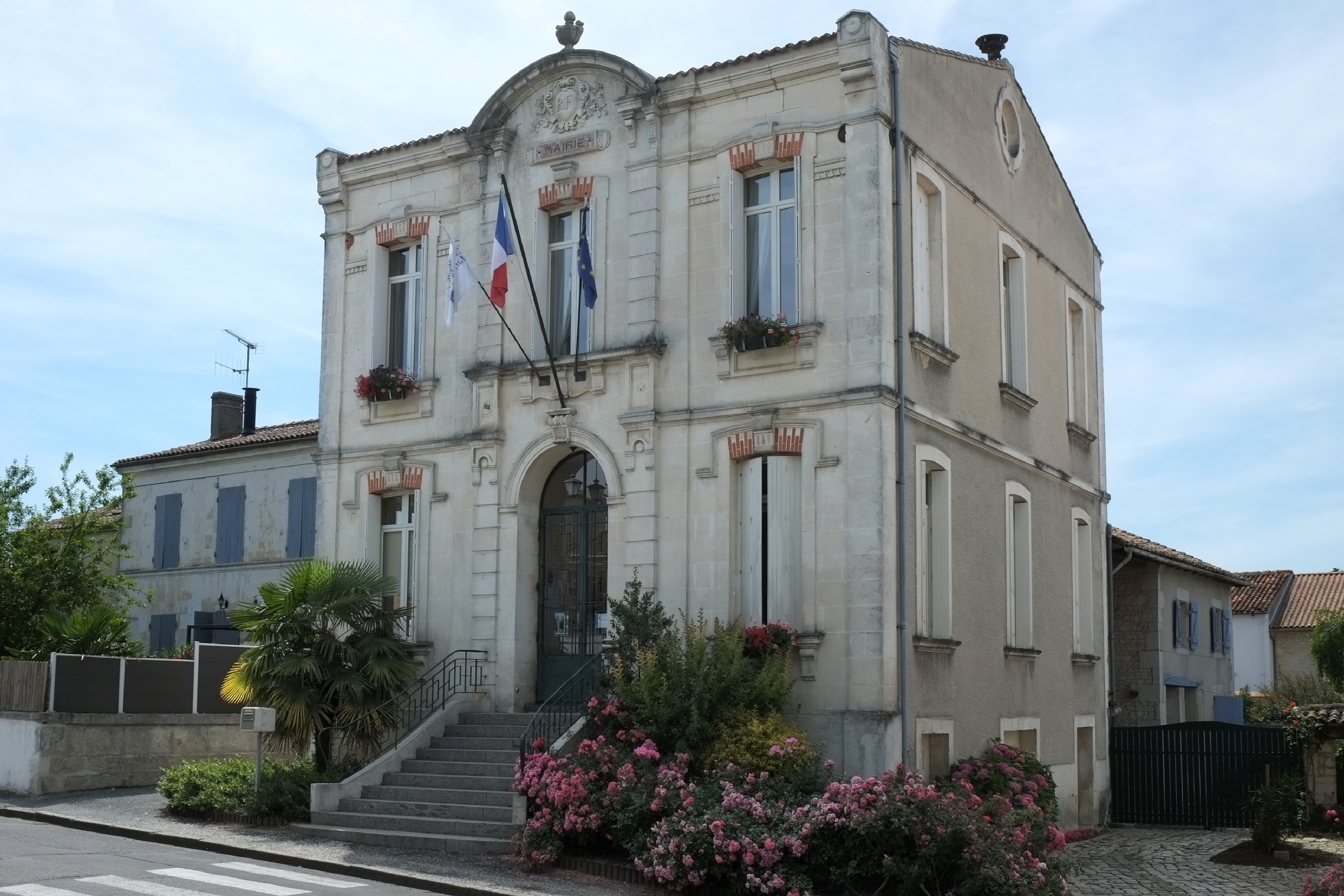
- The town hall in Saint-Georges-du-Bois
- Location of Saint-Georges-du-Bois
- Location within France Location within Nouvelle-Aquitaine
- Coordinates: 46°08′33″N 0°44′03″W
- Country: France
- Region: Nouvelle-Aquitaine
- Department: Charente-Maritime
- Arrondissement: Rochefort
- Canton: Surgères

Government
  - Mayor (2020–2026): Jean Gorioux
- Area^{1}: 27.90 km^{2} (10.77 sq mi)
- Elevation: 45 m (148 ft)
- Highest elevation: 70 m (230 ft)
- Lowest elevation: 22 m (72 ft)
- Population (2023): 1,883
  - Density: 67.49/km^{2} (174.8/sq mi)
- Time zone: UTC+01:00 (CET)
  - Summer (DST): UTC+02:00 (CEST)
- INSEE/Postal code: 17338 /17700
- ^{1} French Land Register data, which excludes lakes, ponds, glaciers > 1 km^{2} (0.386 sq mi or 247 acres) and river estuaries.

Saint-Georges-du-Bois (French pronunciation: [sɛ̃ ʒɔʁʒ dy bwa]) is a commune in the Charente-Maritime department in southwestern France.

== Population ==
Historical population
Year	Pop.	±% p.a.
1968	1,330	—
1975	1,436	+1.10%
1982	1,389	−0.47%
1990	1,373	−0.14%
1999	1,466	+0.73%
2007	1,683	+1.74%
2012	1,774	+1.06%
2017	1,774	+0.00%
2023	1,883	+1.00%
Source: INSEE

== See also ==
- Communes of the Charente-Maritime department
