= Vouhé, Charente-Maritime =

Vouhé
- Commune
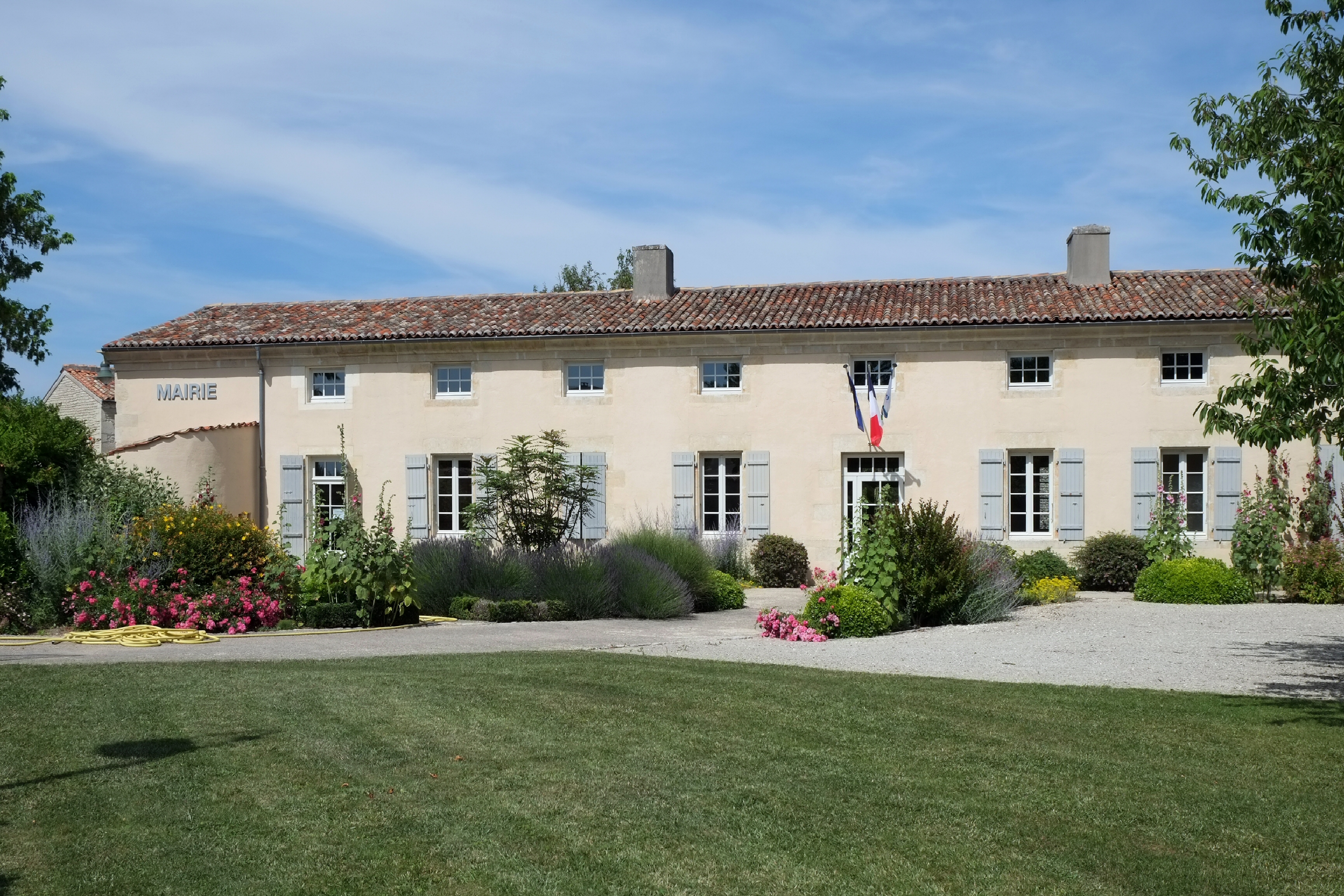
- The town hall in Vouhé
- Location of Vouhé
- Location within France Location within Nouvelle-Aquitaine
- Coordinates: 46°08′55″N 0°47′58″W
- Country: France
- Region: Nouvelle-Aquitaine
- Department: Charente-Maritime
- Arrondissement: Rochefort
- Canton: Surgères
- Intercommunality: Aunis Sud

Government
  - Mayor (2020–2026): Thierry Blaszezyk
- Area^{1}: 15.61 km^{2} (6.03 sq mi)
- Elevation: 24 m (79 ft)
- Highest elevation: 41 m (135 ft)
- Lowest elevation: 13 m (43 ft)
- Population (2023): 674
  - Density: 43.2/km^{2} (112/sq mi)
- Time zone: UTC+01:00 (CET)
  - Summer (DST): UTC+02:00 (CEST)
- INSEE/Postal code: 17482 /17700
- ^{1} French Land Register data, which excludes lakes, ponds, glaciers > 1 km^{2} (0.386 sq mi or 247 acres) and river estuaries.

Vouhé (French pronunciation: [vu.e]) is a commune in the Charente-Maritime department in southwestern France.

== Population ==
Historical population
Year	Pop.	±% p.a.
1968	387	—
1975	364	−0.87%
1982	404	+1.50%
1990	404	+0.00%
1999	392	−0.33%
2007	571	+4.81%
2012	655	+2.78%
2017	656	+0.03%
2023	674	+0.45%
Source: INSEE

== See also ==
- Communes of the Charente-Maritime department
