= Saint-Mard, Charente-Maritime =

Saint-Mard
- Commune
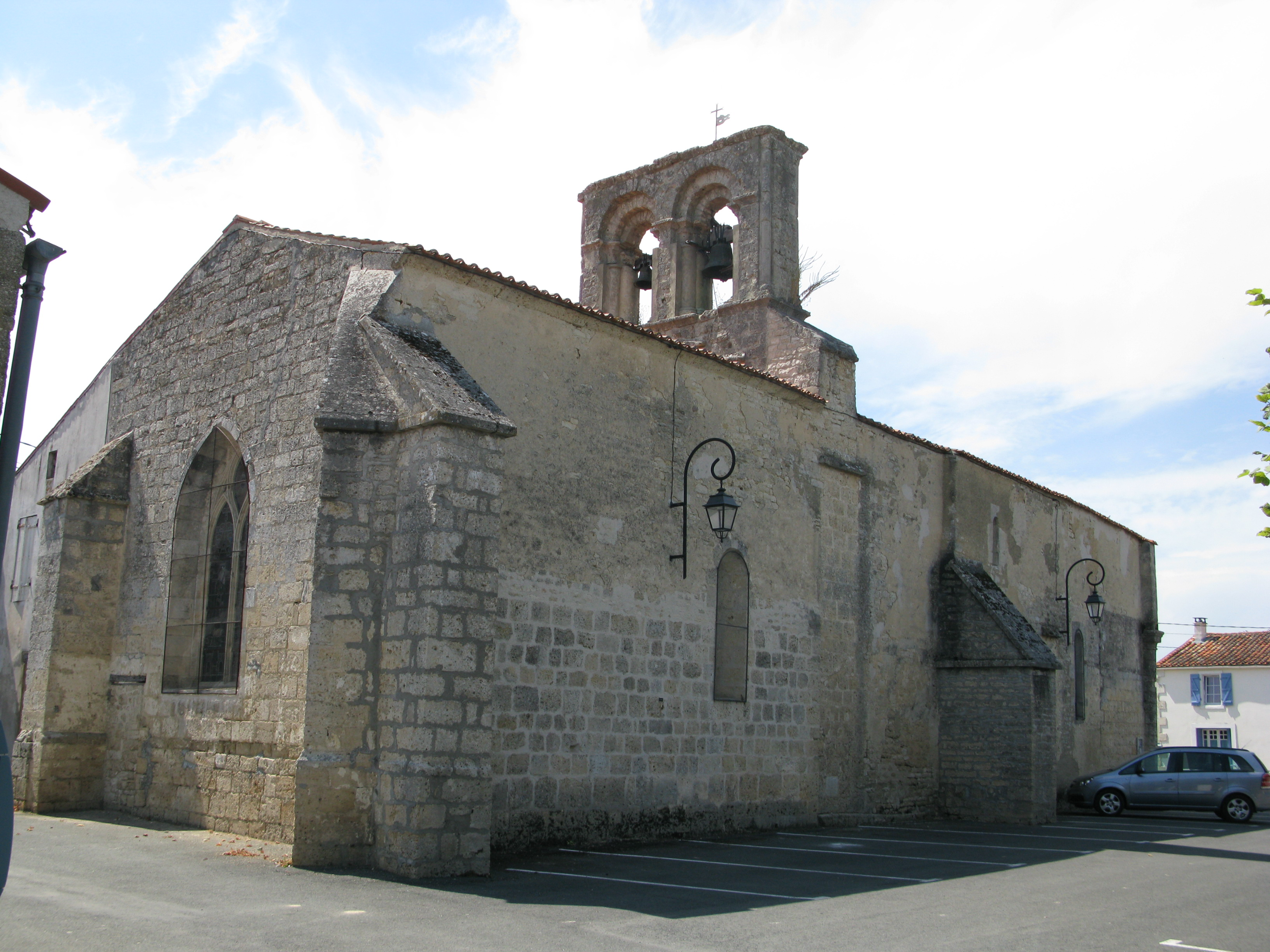
- The church in Saint-Mard
- Location of Saint-Mard
- Location within France Location within Nouvelle-Aquitaine
- Coordinates: 46°05′14″N 0°42′33″W
- Country: France
- Region: Nouvelle-Aquitaine
- Department: Charente-Maritime
- Arrondissement: Rochefort
- Canton: Surgères

Government
  - Mayor (2020–2026): Barbara Gautier
- Area^{1}: 21.21 km^{2} (8.19 sq mi)
- Elevation: 32 m (105 ft)
- Highest elevation: 75 m (246 ft)
- Lowest elevation: 24 m (79 ft)
- Population (2023): 1,261
  - Density: 59.45/km^{2} (154.0/sq mi)
- Time zone: UTC+01:00 (CET)
  - Summer (DST): UTC+02:00 (CEST)
- INSEE/Postal code: 17359 /17700
- ^{1} French Land Register data, which excludes lakes, ponds, glaciers > 1 km^{2} (0.386 sq mi or 247 acres) and river estuaries.

Saint-Mard (French pronunciation: [sɛ̃ maʁ]) is a commune in the Charente-Maritime department in southwestern France.

== Population ==
Historical population
| Year | Pop. | ±% p.a. |
|---|---|---|
| 1968 | 948 | — |
| 1975 | 914 | −0.52% |
| 1982 | 935 | +0.33% |
| 1990 | 865 | −0.97% |
| 1999 | 868 | +0.04% |
| 2007 | 975 | +1.46% |
| 2012 | 1,148 | +3.32% |
| 2017 | 1,198 | +0.86% |
| 2023 | 1,261 | +0.86% |
Source: INSEE

== See also ==
- Communes of the Charente-Maritime department
