= Chambon, Charente-Maritime =

Chambon
- Commune
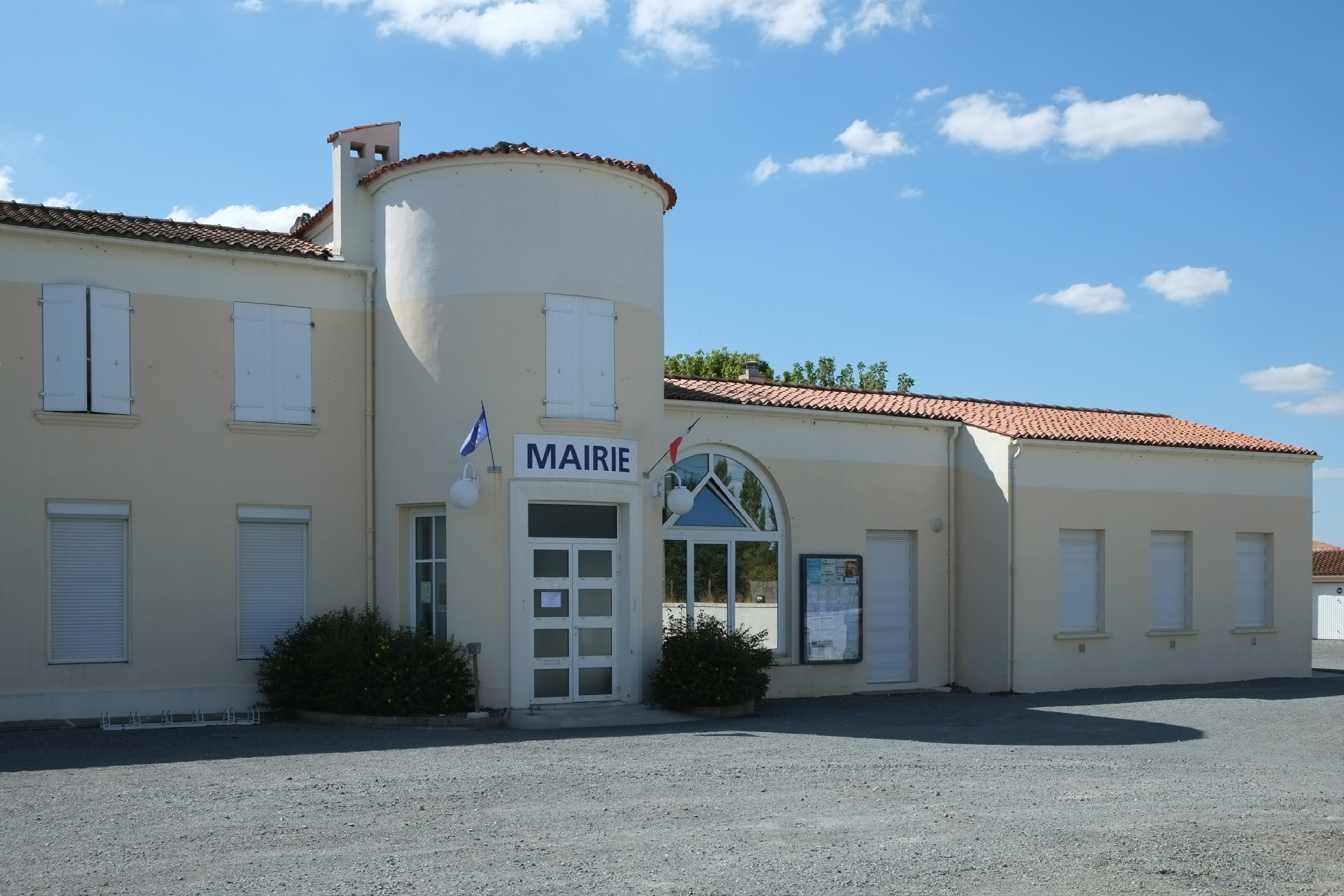
- The town hall in Chambon
- Location of Chambon
- Location within France Location within Nouvelle-Aquitaine
- Coordinates: 46°07′42″N 0°50′57″W
- Country: France
- Region: Nouvelle-Aquitaine
- Department: Charente-Maritime
- Arrondissement: Rochefort
- Canton: Surgères

Government
  - Mayor (2020–2026): Angélique Peintre
- Area^{1}: 18.33 km^{2} (7.08 sq mi)
- Elevation: 25 m (82 ft)
- Highest elevation: 41 m (135 ft)
- Lowest elevation: 13 m (43 ft)
- Population (2023): 983
  - Density: 53.6/km^{2} (139/sq mi)
- Time zone: UTC+01:00 (CET)
  - Summer (DST): UTC+02:00 (CEST)
- INSEE/Postal code: 17080 /17290
- ^{1} French Land Register data, which excludes lakes, ponds, glaciers > 1 km^{2} (0.386 sq mi or 247 acres) and river estuaries.

Chambon (French pronunciation: [ʃɑ̃bɔ̃]) is a commune in the Charente-Maritime department, in the region of Nouvelle-Aquitaine, southwestern France.

== Population ==
Historical population
Year	Pop.	±% p.a.
1968	566	—
1975	554	−0.31%
1982	634	+1.95%
1990	730	+1.78%
1999	739	+0.14%
2007	856	+1.85%
2012	891	+0.80%
2017	928	+0.82%
2023	983	+0.96%
Source: INSEE

== See also ==
- Communes of the Charente-Maritime department
