= Breuil-la-Réorte =

- Commune
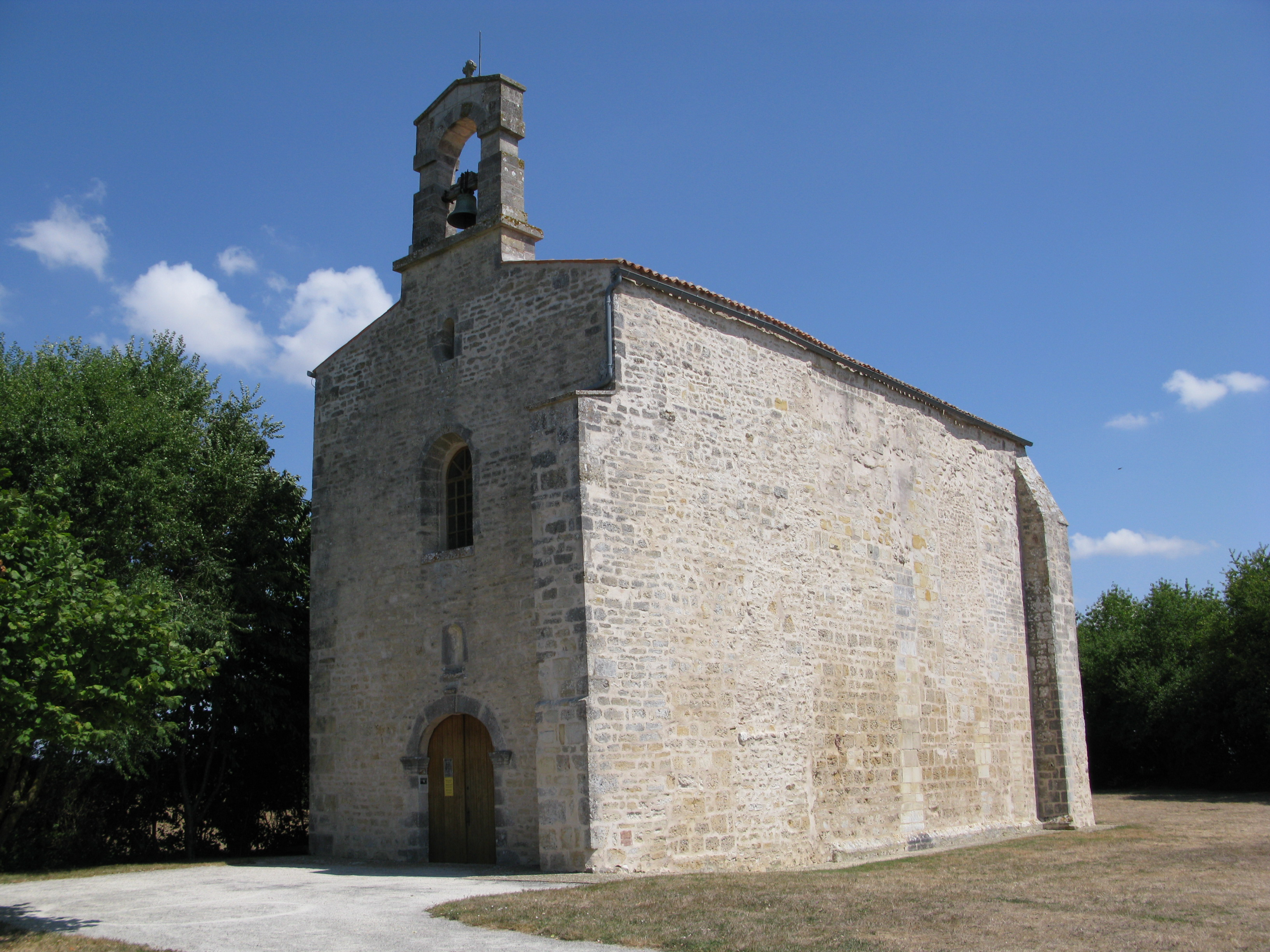
- The church in Breuil-la-Réorte
- Location of Breuil-la-Réorte
- Location within France Location within Nouvelle-Aquitaine
- Coordinates: 46°03′10″N 0°41′20″W
- Country: France
- Region: Nouvelle-Aquitaine
- Department: Charente-Maritime
- Arrondissement: Rochefort
- Canton: Surgères

Government
  - Mayor (2020–2026): Eric Bernardin
- Area^{1}: 16.07 km^{2} (6.20 sq mi)
- Elevation: 40 m (130 ft)
- Highest elevation: 63 m (207 ft)
- Lowest elevation: 21 m (69 ft)
- Population (2023): 470
  - Density: 29/km^{2} (76/sq mi)
- Time zone: UTC+01:00 (CET)
  - Summer (DST): UTC+02:00 (CEST)
- INSEE/Postal code: 17063 /17700
- ^{1} French Land Register data, which excludes lakes, ponds, glaciers > 1 km^{2} (0.386 sq mi or 247 acres) and river estuaries.

Breuil-la-Réorte (French pronunciation: [bʁœj la ʁeɔʁt]) is a commune in the Charente-Maritime department in the Nouvelle-Aquitaine region in southwestern France.

== Population ==
Historical population
Year	Pop.	±% p.a.
1968	365	—
1975	328	−1.52%
1982	353	+1.05%
1990	329	−0.88%
1999	312	−0.59%
2007	344	+1.23%
2012	459	+5.94%
2017	457	−0.09%
2023	470	+0.47%
Source: INSEE

== See also ==
- Communes of the Charente-Maritime department
