= Canton of Courçon =

Coordinates: 46°15′N 0°50′W

Courçon
- Former canton
- Interactive map of Courçon
- Country: France
- Region: Nouvelle-Aquitaine
- Department: Charente-Maritime
- No. of communes: {{{nbcomm}}}
- Disbanded: 2015
- Area: 254.53 km^{2} (98.27 sq mi)
- Population (2012): 14,928
  - Density: 58.649/km^{2} (151.90/sq mi)

The Canton of Courçon is a former canton of the Charente-Maritime département, in France. It was disbanded following the French canton reorganisation, which came into effect in March 2015. It consisted of 14 communes, which joined the canton of Marans in 2015. It had 14,928 inhabitants, as per the 2012 census. The lowest point was the river Sèvre Niortaise (2 m), the highest point was in Benon at 56 m, and the average elevation was 12 m. The most populated commune was Saint-Jean-de-Liversay with 2,570 inhabitants (2012).

== Communes of Courçon ==
The canton comprised the following communes:

- Angliers
- Benon
- Courçon
- Cramchaban
- Ferrières
- La Grève-sur-Mignon
- Le Gué-d'Alleré
- La Laigne
- Nuaillé-d'Aunis
- La Ronde
- Saint-Cyr-du-Doret
- Saint-Jean-de-Liversay
- Saint-Sauveur-d'Aunis
- Taugon

== Population history ==
Year	Population
1962	7,685
1968	8,067
1975	7,772
1982	8,048
1990	8,277
1999	9,121
2008	12,841
2012	14,928

== See also ==
- Cantons of the Charente-Maritime department
