= Arrondissement of La Rochelle =

Coordinates: 46°10′N 1°10′W

La Rochelle
- Arrondissement
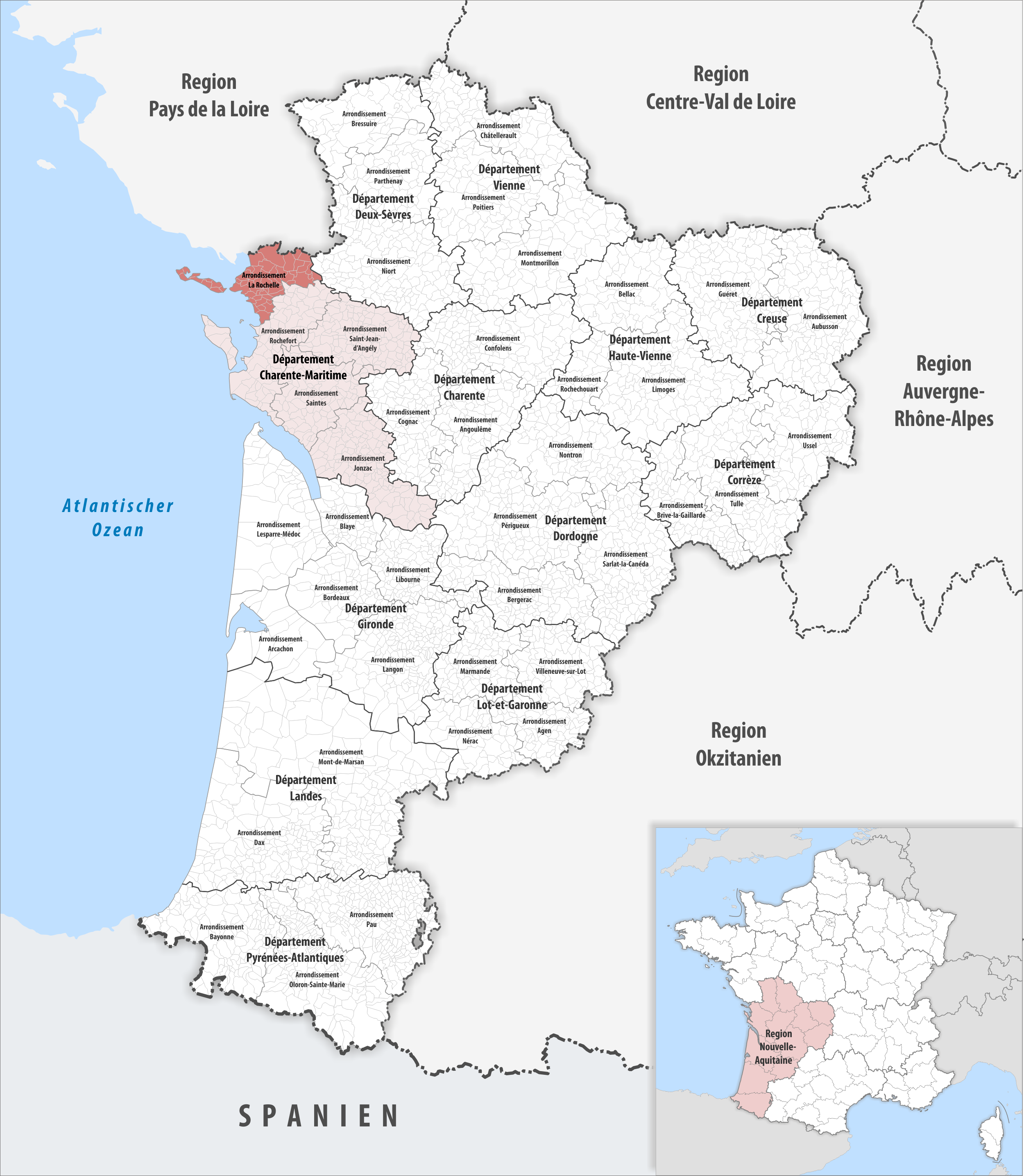
- Location within the region Nouvelle-Aquitaine
- Country: France
- Region: Nouvelle-Aquitaine
- Department: Charente-Maritime
- No. of communes: {{{nbcomm}}}
- Area: 852.8 km^{2} (329.3 sq mi)
- Population (2023): 233,243
  - Density: 273.5/km^{2} (708.4/sq mi)
- INSEE code: 173

The Arrondissement of La Rochelle (French: arrondissement de La Rochelle) is an arrondissement of France, located in the Charente-Maritime department, region of Nouvelle-Aquitaine. It has 58 communes. Its population is 227,693 (2021), and its area is 852.8 km^{2} (329.3 sq mi).

== Composition ==
The communes of the arrondissement of La Rochelle, and their INSEE codes, are:

1. Andilly (17008)
2. Angliers (17009)
3. Angoulins (17010)
4. Ars-en-Ré (17019)
5. Aytré (17028)
6. Benon (17041)
7. Le Bois-Plage-en-Ré (17051)
8. Bourgneuf (17059)
9. Charron (17091)
10. Châtelaillon-Plage (17340)
11. Clavette (17109)
12. La Couarde-sur-Mer (17121)
13. Courçon (17127)
14. Cramchaban (17132)
15. Croix-Chapeau (17136)
16. Dompierre-sur-Mer (17142)
17. Esnandes (17153)
18. Ferrières (17158)
19. La Flotte (17161)
20. La Grève-sur-Mignon (17182)
21. Le Gué-d'Alleré (17186)
22. L'Houmeau (17190)
23. La Jarne (17193)
24. La Jarrie (17194)
25. Lagord (17200)
26. La Laigne (17201)
27. Loix (17207)
28. Longèves (17208)
29. Marans (17218)
30. Marsilly (17222)
31. Montroy (17245)
32. Nieul-sur-Mer (17264)
33. Nuaillé-d'Aunis (17267)
34. Périgny (17274)
35. Les Portes-en-Ré (17286)
36. Puilboreau (17291)
37. Rivedoux-Plage (17297)
38. La Rochelle (17300)
39. La Ronde (17303)
40. Saint-Christophe (17315)
41. Saint-Clément-des-Baleines (17318)
42. Saint-Cyr-du-Doret (17322)
43. Sainte-Marie-de-Ré (17360)
44. Sainte-Soulle (17407)
45. Saint-Jean-de-Liversay (17349)
46. Saint-Martin-de-Ré (17369)
47. Saint-Médard-d'Aunis (17373)
48. Saint-Ouen-d'Aunis (17376)
49. Saint-Rogatien (17391)
50. Saint-Sauveur-d'Aunis (17396)
51. Saint-Vivien (17290)
52. Saint-Xandre (17414)
53. Salles-sur-Mer (17420)
54. Taugon (17439)
55. Thairé (17443)
56. Vérines (17466)
57. Villedoux (17472)
58. Yves (17340)

== History ==
The arrondissement of La Rochelle was created in 1800. At the January 2017 reorganisation of the arrondissements of Charente-Maritime, it gained two communes from the arrondissement of Rochefort, and it lost one commune to the arrondissement of Rochefort.

As a result of the reorganisation of the cantons of France which came into effect in 2015, the borders of the cantons are no longer related to the borders of the arrondissements. The cantons of the arrondissement of La Rochelle were, as of January 2015:

1. Ars-en-Ré
2. Aytré
3. Courçon
4. La Jarrie
5. Marans
6. La Rochelle-1
7. La Rochelle-2
8. La Rochelle-3
9. La Rochelle-4
10. La Rochelle-5
11. La Rochelle-6
12. La Rochelle-7
13. La Rochelle-8
14. La Rochelle-9
15. Saint-Martin-de-Ré
