= Andilly, Charente-Maritime =

Andilly
- Commune
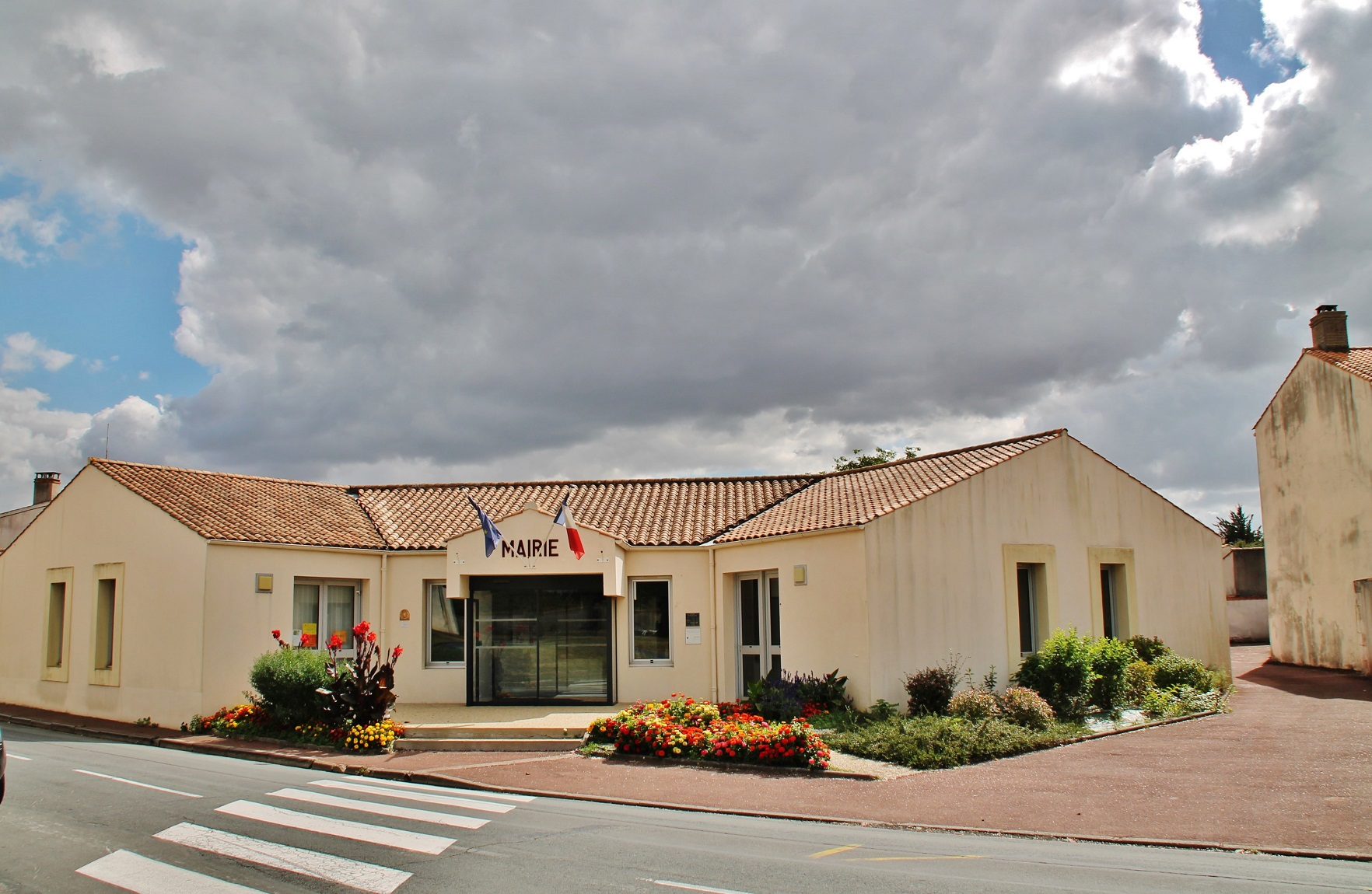
- The Town Hall
- Location of Andilly
- Location within France Location within Nouvelle-Aquitaine
- Coordinates: 46°15′14″N 1°01′32″W
- Country: France
- Region: Nouvelle-Aquitaine
- Department: Charente-Maritime
- Arrondissement: La Rochelle
- Canton: Marans
- Intercommunality: Aunis Atlantique

Government
  - Mayor (2020–2026): Sylvain Fagot
- Area^{1}: 28.53 km^{2} (11.02 sq mi)
- Elevation: 13 m (43 ft)
- Highest elevation: 24 m (79 ft)
- Lowest elevation: 0 m (0 ft)
- Population (2023): 2,350
  - Density: 82.4/km^{2} (213/sq mi)
- Time zone: UTC+01:00 (CET)
  - Summer (DST): UTC+02:00 (CEST)
- INSEE/Postal code: 17008 /17230
- ^{1} French Land Register data, which excludes lakes, ponds, glaciers > 1 km^{2} (0.386 sq mi or 247 acres) and river estuaries.

Andilly (French pronunciation: [ɑ̃diji]) is a commune in the Charente-Maritime department in the Nouvelle-Aquitaine region of southwestern France.

== Geography ==
=== Location ===
Andilly is a marshy commune in the western part of the Poitevin Marsh located in the northwest of the Charente-Maritime 6.5 km south of Marans, the chief town of the canton, and 17 km north-east of La Rochelle, the prefecture of the department.

=== Setting ===
The commune includes the town of Andilly, the village of "Sérigny", and a place called "Bel-Air".

Andilly belongs to the western or dried-up part of the Poitevin Marsh and is a large grain-producing area. The commune is particularly well served by diversion canals, for draining and irrigation. Among these, two major canals cross the commune: the Canal du Curé crosses from east to west and the Canal from Marans to La Rochelle from north to south.

Andilly is watered in all the central parts and in the west by the Canal du Curé, which is formed from the lower reaches of the river Cure that is canalised from the commune of Anais. In Andilly, the Canal du Curé has long been called the Grand Canal of Andilly since its construction in 1771.

From north to south, the commune is traversed by the Canal from Marans to La Rochelle, which crosses the Canal du Curé northwest of Andilly town where significant crossing locks were built at a place called the Locks of Andilly.

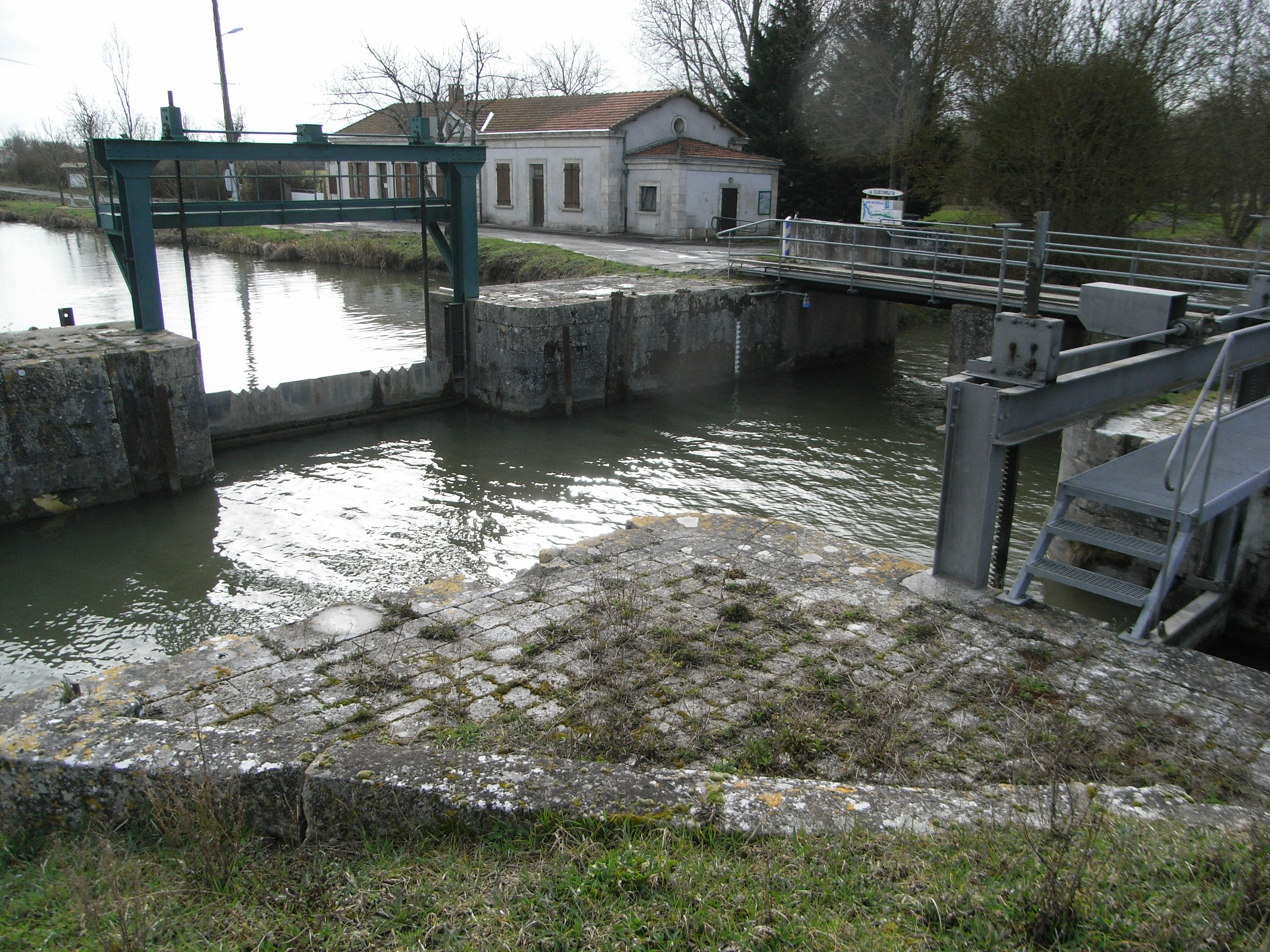
Locks of Andilly

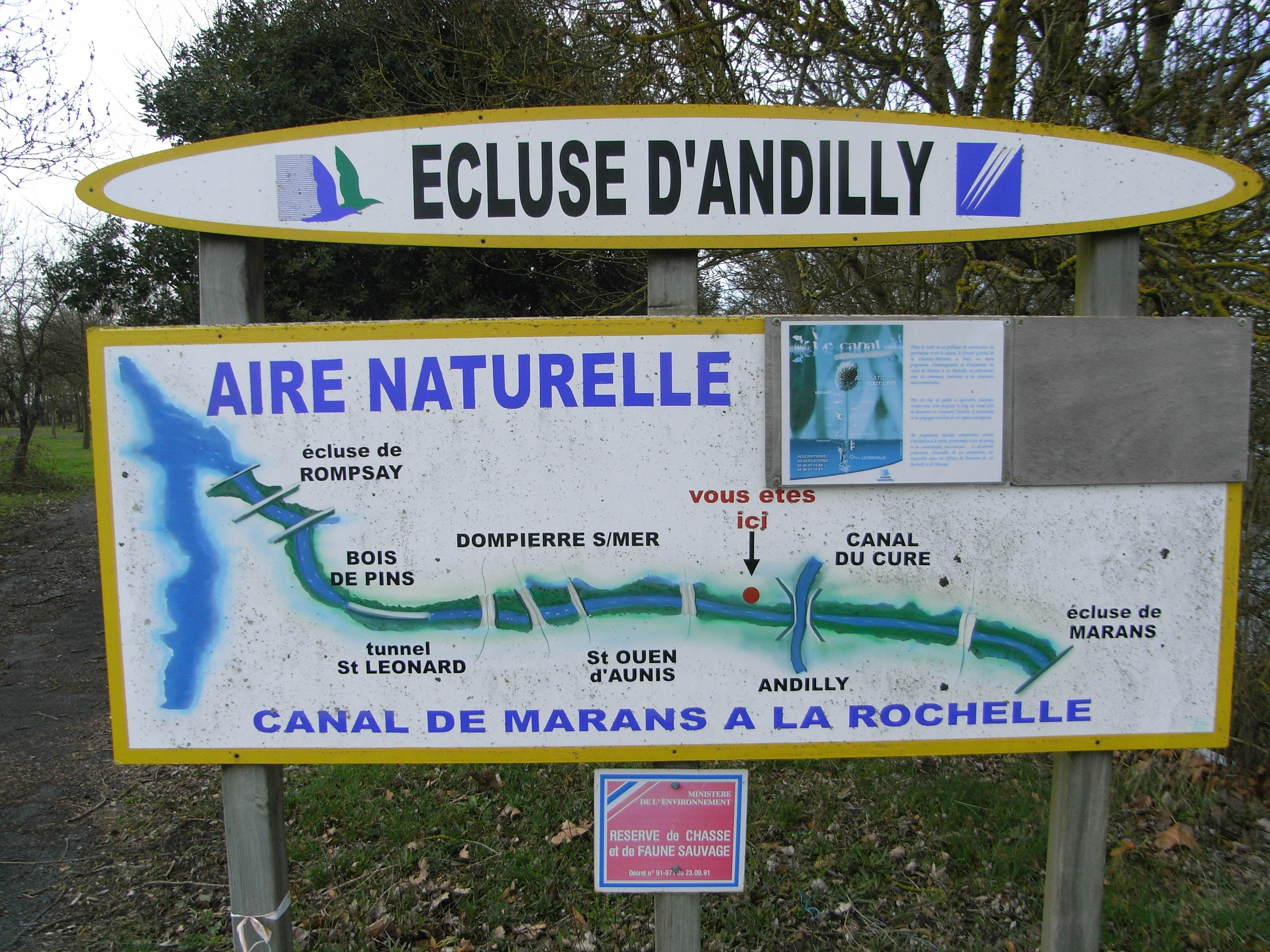
Plan of canal at Andilly locks

== History ==
- During the Wars of Religion Andilly was an advanced military post.
- There are remains of the castle
- There are ruins of a priory and a castle with underground passages
- There are also prehistoric underground refuges and relics

== Administration ==
List of Successive Mayors

From	To	Name	Party	Position
1977	1983	Raoul Jardonnet		Carpenter
1983	1995	Michel Fillodeau	ind.	Farmer
1995	2008	Christian Point	ind.	Civil Engineer
2008	2014	Maurice Debègue	ind.	IT Engineer
2014	2026	Sylvain Fagot	DVG	

== Population ==
The inhabitants of the commune are known as Andillais or Andillaises in French.

Historical population
Year	Pop.	±% p.a.
1968	964	—
1975	1,075	+1.57%
1982	1,352	+3.33%
1990	1,481	+1.15%
1999	1,478	−0.02%
2007	1,900	+3.19%
2012	2,039	+1.42%
2017	2,235	+1.85%
2023	2,350	+0.84%
Source: INSEE

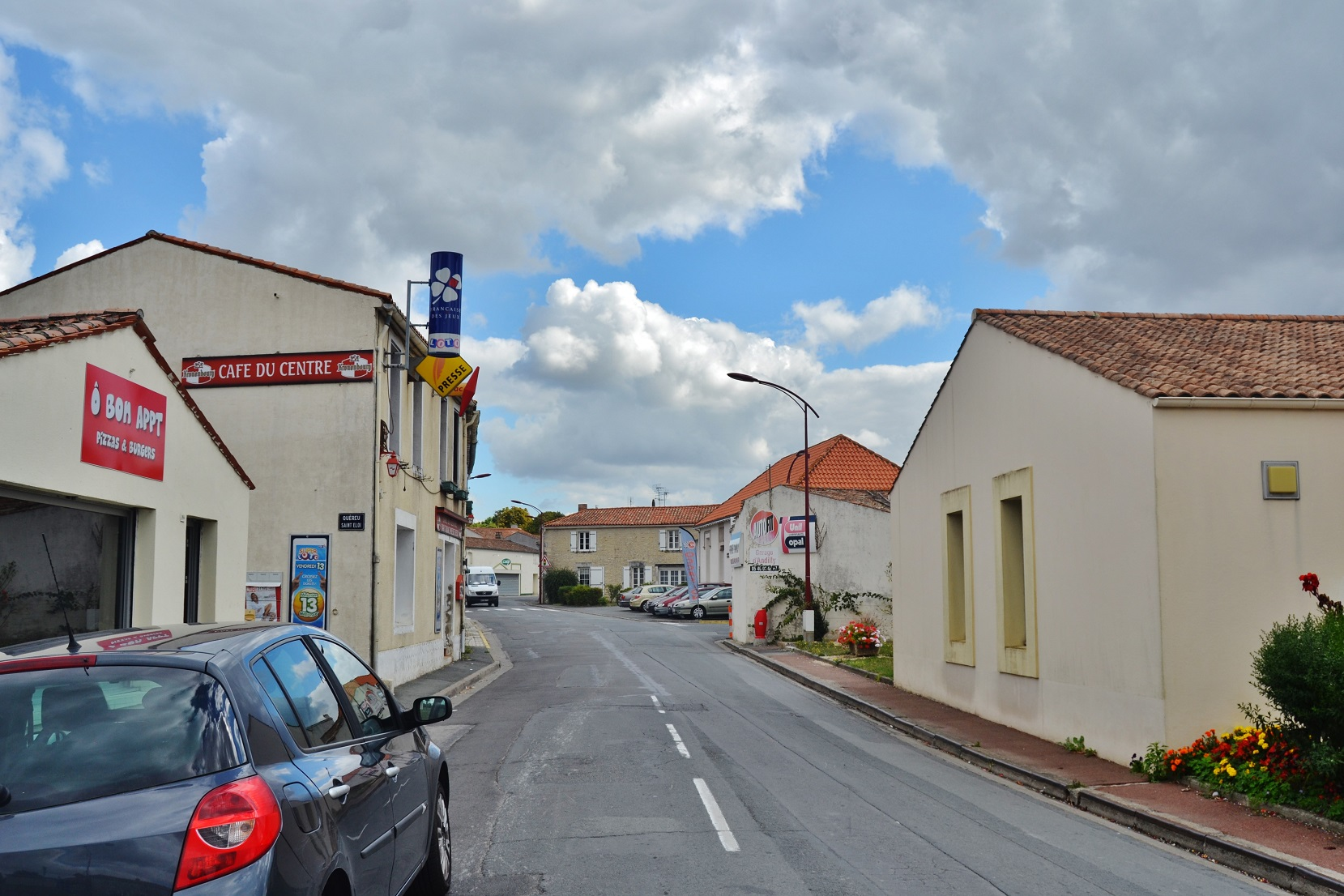
Andilly village

== Sites and monuments ==
- The Dairy and Casein Factory (19th century) is registered as an historical monument.
- The Church of Saint Nazaire
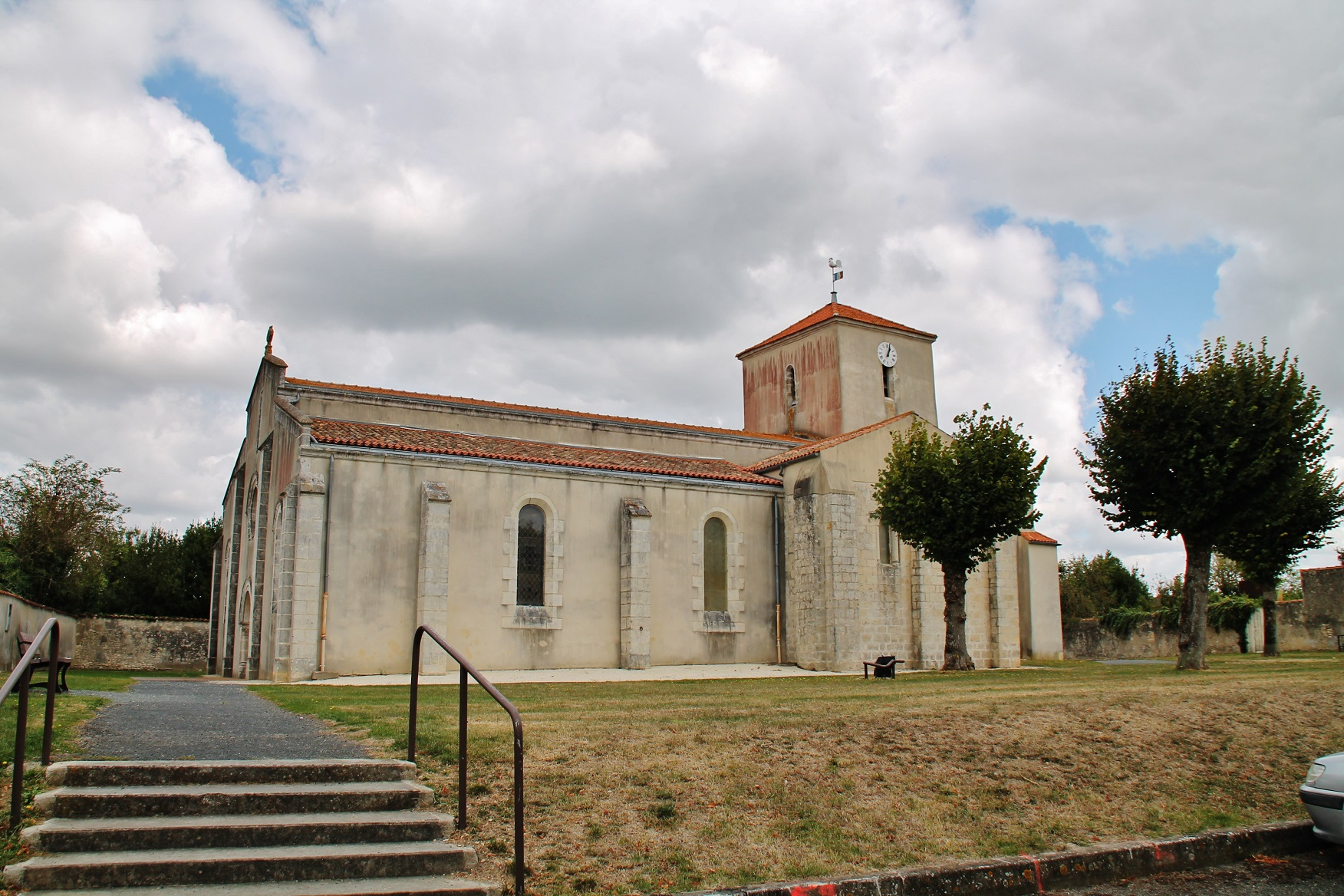
The church of Saint-Nazaire

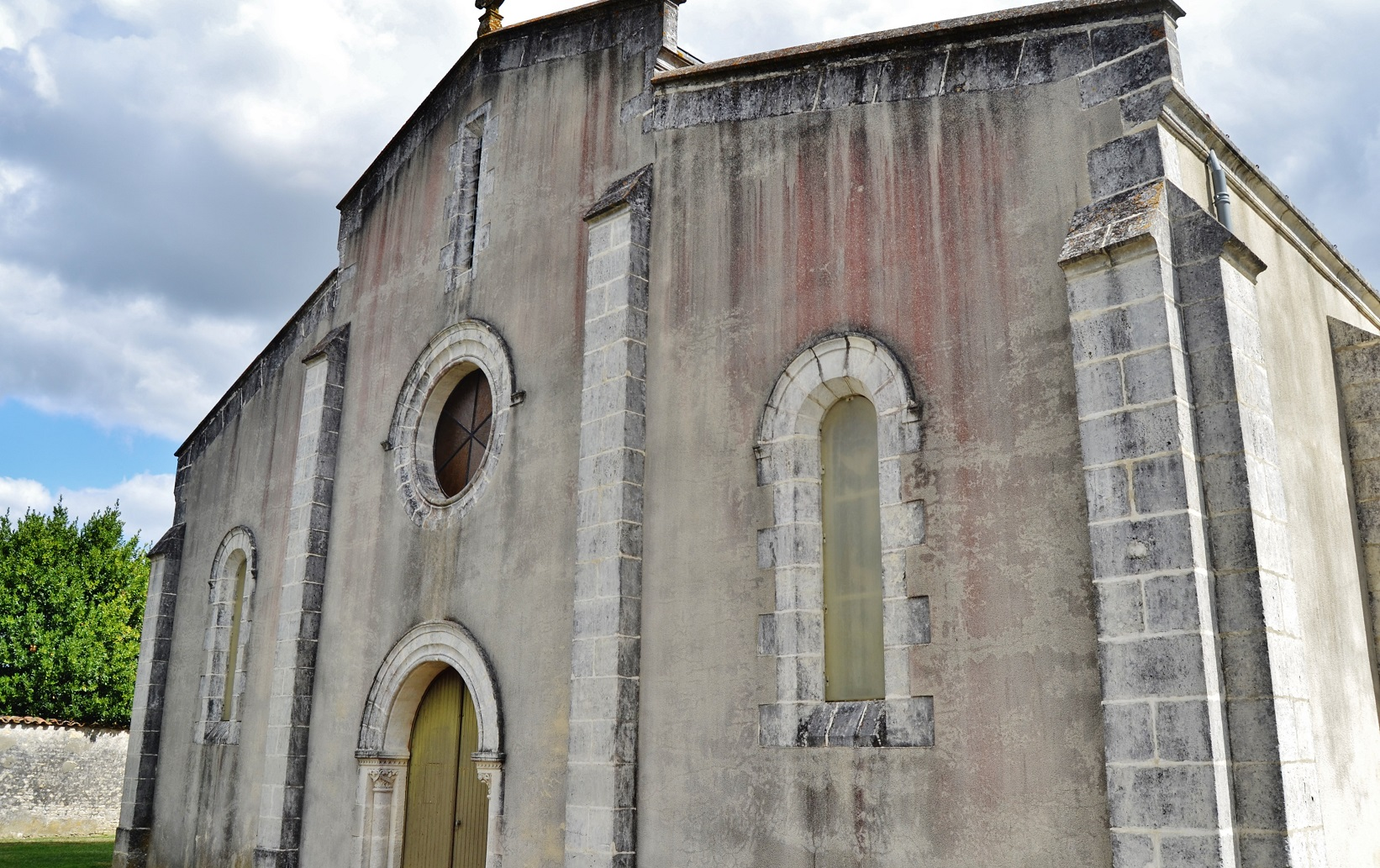
The church facade

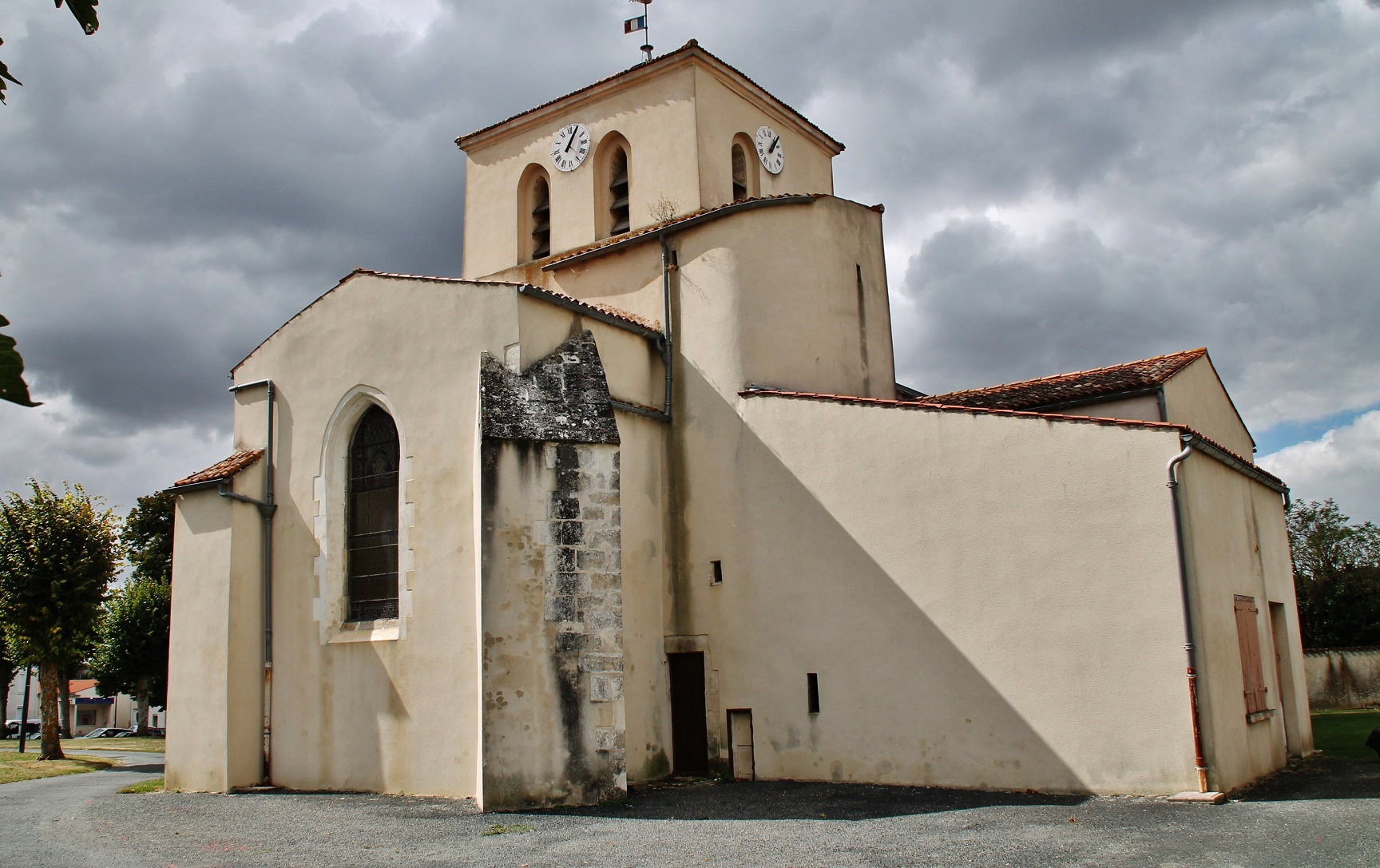
The rear of the church
- Remains of a medieval castle and a priory.

== Transport ==
=== Railway Stations and Halts ===
- La Rochelle (TGV) 14.7 km
- Aytré (Halt) 16.2 km
- Angoulins (Halt) 17.6 km
- Châtelaillon 20.2 km
- Surgères (TGV) 25.4 km

=== Airports and Aerodromes ===
- La Rochelle 15.6 km
- Rochefort-Saint-Agnant 40.8 km
- Niort 48.2 km

=== Roads ===
- The D137 crosses the commune from Marans in the north passing between Andilly town and Serigny and continuing south to Usseau
- The D20 connects the D137 to Andilly town and continues south-west to Villedoux
- The D202 goes south from the town to Saint-Ouen-d'Aunis
- The D112 goes south-east from the town to Longèves

== Sports ==
Andilly was the arrival point of the 1st stage and departure point of the 2nd stage of the Tour du Poitou-Charentes in 2004.

== See also ==
- Communes of the Charente-Maritime department
