= Cantons of the Charente-Maritime department =

The following is a list of the 27 cantons of the Charente-Maritime department, in France, following the French canton reorganisation which came into effect in March 2015:

- Aytré
- Chaniers
- Châtelaillon-Plage
- Île d'Oléron
- Île de Ré
- La Jarrie
- Jonzac
- Lagord
- Marans
- Marennes
- Matha
- Pons
- Rochefort
- La Rochelle-1
- La Rochelle-2
- La Rochelle-3
- Royan
- Saint-Jean-d'Angély
- Saint-Porchaire
- Saintes
- Saintonge Estuaire
- Saujon
- Surgères
- Thénac
- Tonnay-Charente
- La Tremblade
- Les Trois Monts
