= Longèves =

Longèves may refer to the following places in France:

- Longèves, Charente-Maritime
- Longèves, Vendée
