= Angliers, Charente-Maritime =

Angliers
- Commune
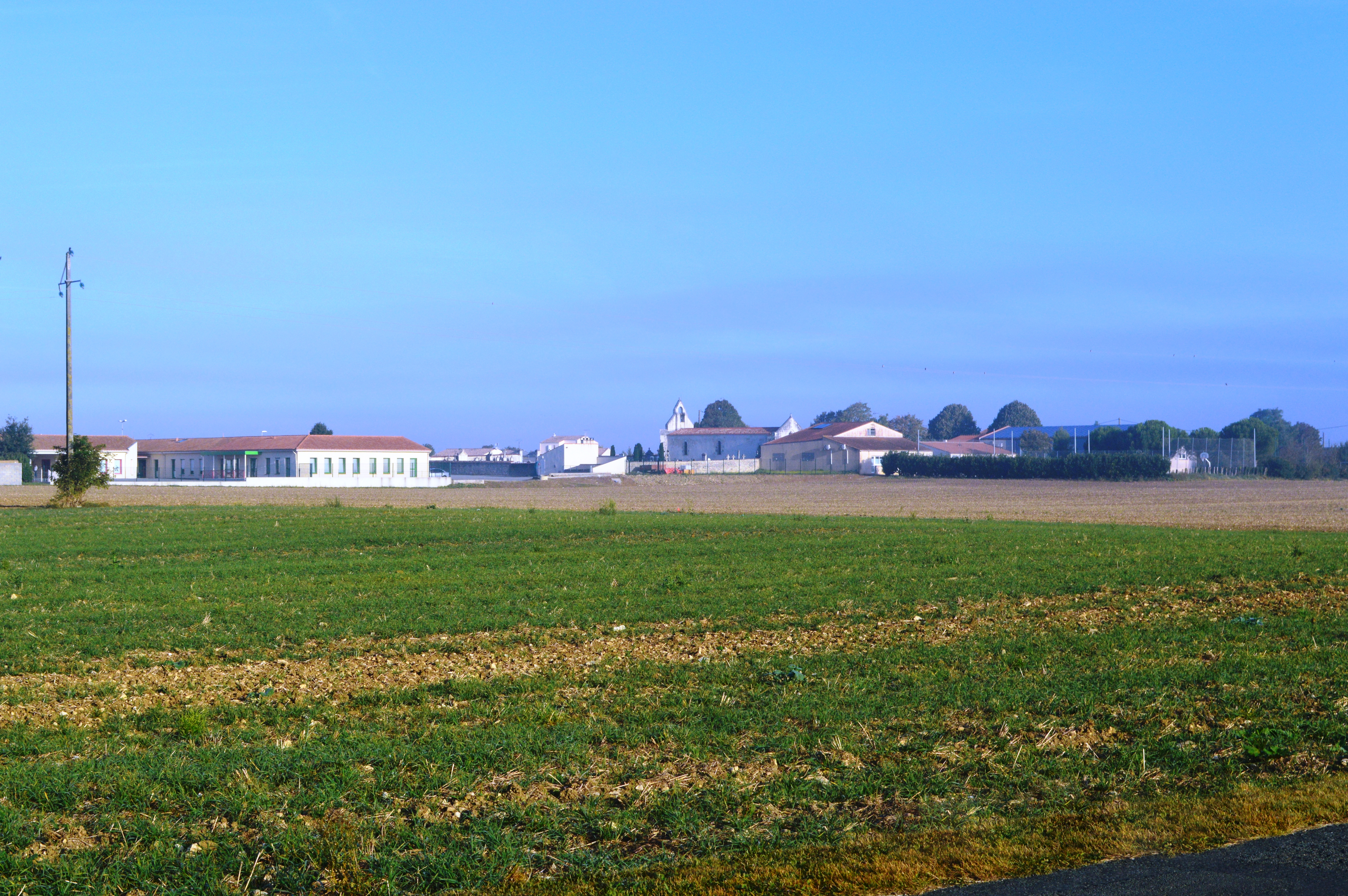
- A general view of Angliers

- Coat of arms
- Location of Angliers
- Location within France Location within Nouvelle-Aquitaine
- Coordinates: 46°12′46″N 0°56′55″W
- Country: France
- Region: Nouvelle-Aquitaine
- Department: Charente-Maritime
- Arrondissement: La Rochelle
- Canton: Marans
- Intercommunality: Aunis Atlantique

Government
  - Mayor (2020–2026): Didier Taupin
- Area^{1}: 10.74 km^{2} (4.15 sq mi)
- Elevation: 6 m (20 ft)
- Highest elevation: 19 m (62 ft)
- Lowest elevation: 1 m (3.3 ft)
- Population (2023): 1,447
  - Density: 134.7/km^{2} (348.9/sq mi)
- Time zone: UTC+01:00 (CET)
  - Summer (DST): UTC+02:00 (CEST)
- INSEE/Postal code: 17009 /17540
- ^{1} French Land Register data, which excludes lakes, ponds, glaciers > 1 km^{2} (0.386 sq mi or 247 acres) and river estuaries.

Angliers (French pronunciation: [ɑ̃ɡlije]) is a commune in the Charente-Maritime department in the Nouvelle-Aquitaine region of south-western France.

== Geography ==
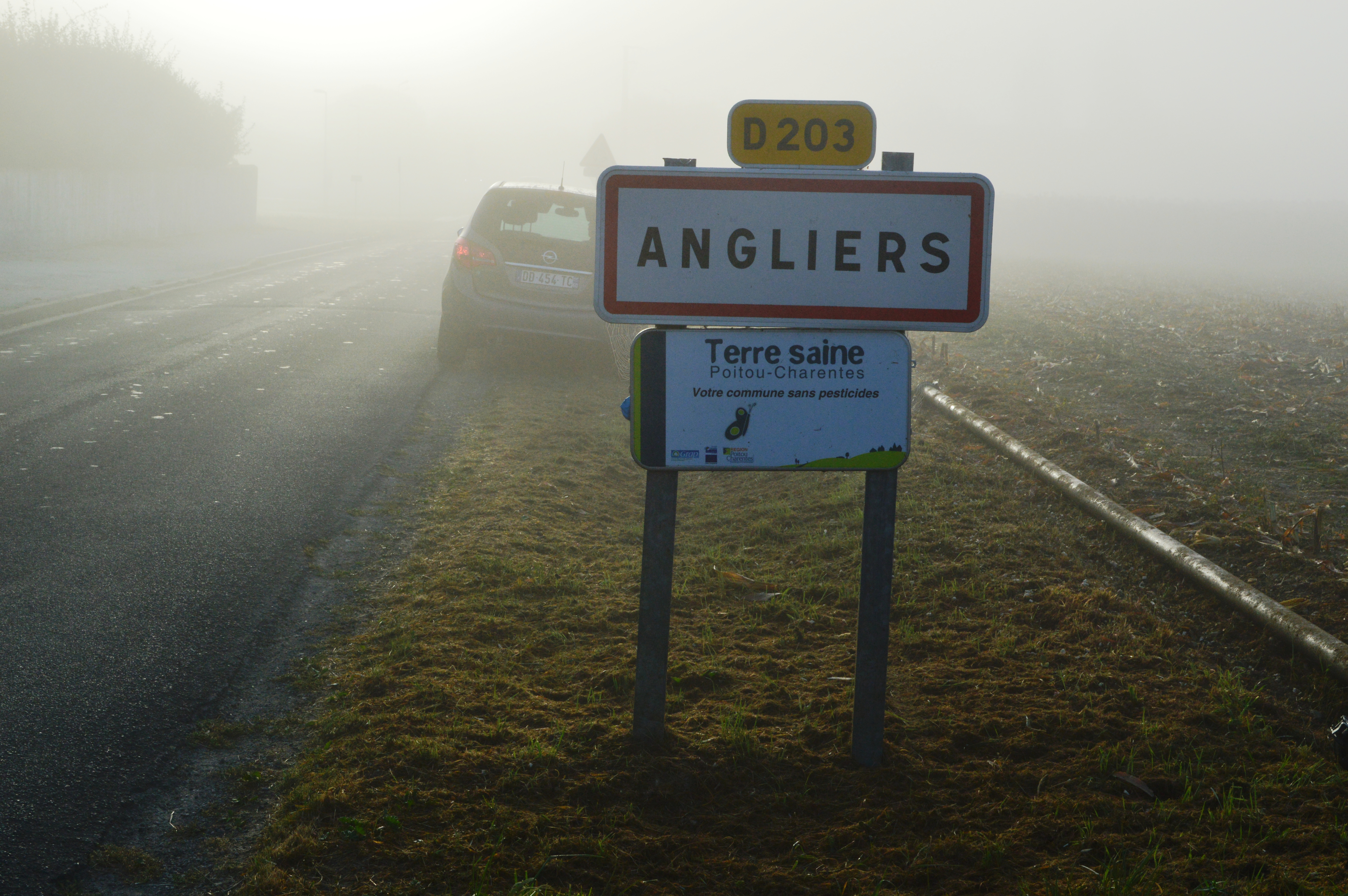
Entry sign to Angliers (in fog)

Angliers is located some 15 km north-east of La Rochelle and 15 km south by south-east of Marans. National highway N11 (E601) passes through the north of the commune and there is an exit at the north-eastern tip of the commune to the D109 road which runs south through the commune to Vérines. Access to the village is by a country road off the D109. There is also the D203E1 road running from the hamlet of Saint-Gilles west to Loiré. Apart from the village, there are also the hamlets of Le Grand Peu, Saint-Gilles, and Les Loges. The commune is entirely farmland.

Angliers commune is divided into two clearly distinct parts:

- To the west, the commune is a part of the plain of Aunis and is characterized by rolling limestone hills.
- To the east is a marsh which is part of the Marais Poitevin.

The swamp is drained by the waters of the Curé river which is a small coastal river and serves as the eastern boundary of the commune. This river has its source in the commune of Saint-Georges-du-Bois and becomes a Canal before emptying into the Bay of Aiguillon. It is called the Canal du Curé at Angliers. Formerly, the eastern part of Angliers was always flooded along the road north of the commune that joins the village of Le Grand Peu to Nuaillé-d'Aunis. Angliers is at the southern limit of the Marais Poitevin.

=== Transport ===
Railway Stations and Halts

- La Rochelle (TGV) 16.2 km
- Aytré (Halt) 16.4 km
- Mer 16.7 km
- Châtelaillon 18.2 km
- Surgères (TGV) 18.4 km

Airports and aerodromes

- La Rochelle – Île de Ré Airport 18.9 km
- Rochefort - Saint-Agnant Airport 36.1 km
- Niort 43.9 km

== History ==
The history of Angliers before Gallo-Roman times has been lost, as with many neighbouring communes. However, a few important remains have been found. Sarcophagi found in the 19th century at Gillebergère are not necessarily from those remote times. Ancient relics are rare but the door of the church dates from 1100/1130. It once came under the Abbey of Nieul-sur-l'Autise. This church has undergone many changes throughout its history mainly because of the Hundred Years War and the Wars of Religion. The fighting that took place around the castles of Benon, Nuaillé-d'Aunis, and Surgères suggest many passages by the Port Bertrand through the east of Angliers to the town of La Rochelle.

== Administration ==
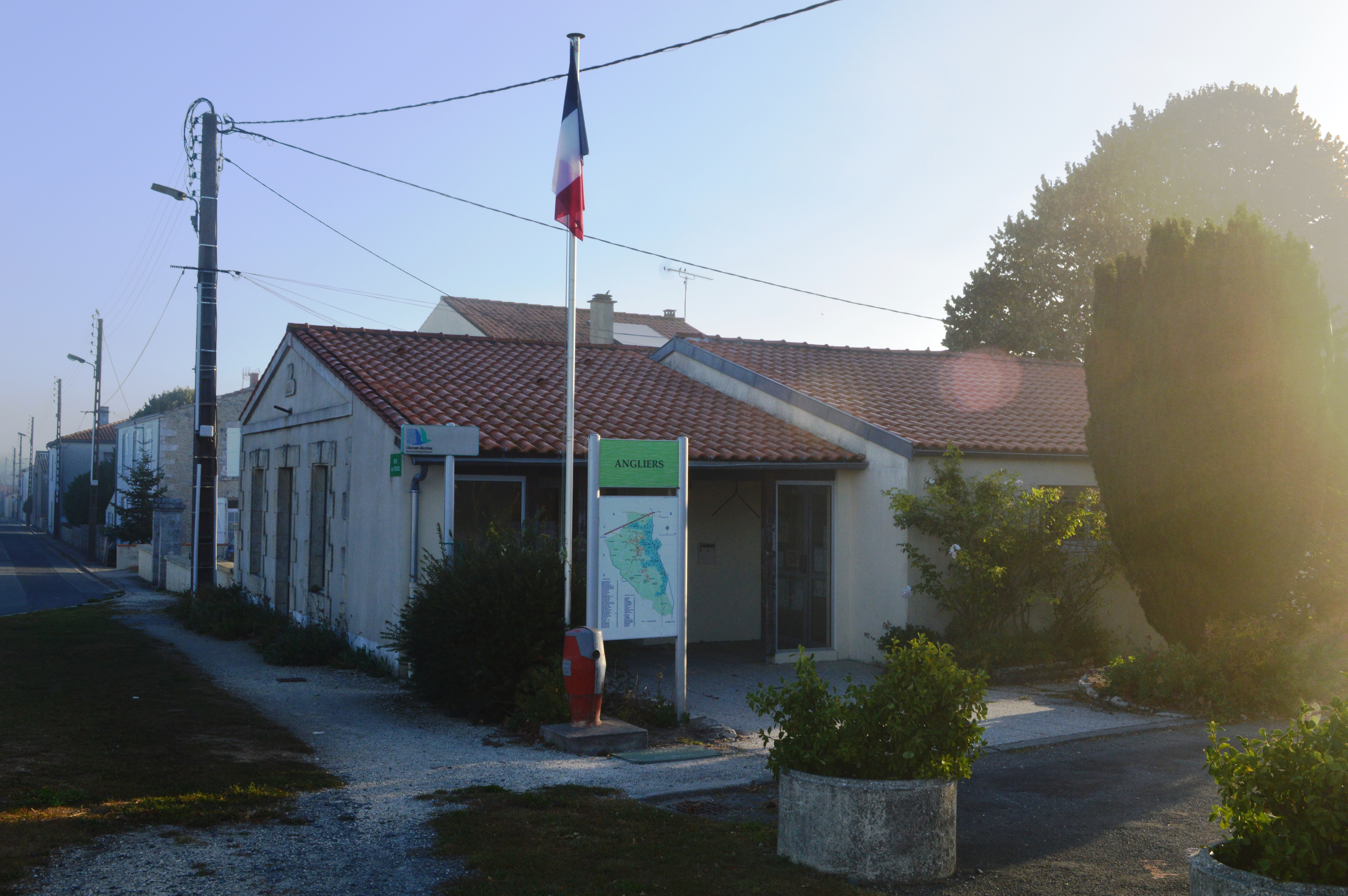
The Town Hall

List of Successive Mayors

From	To	Name	Party	Position
2001	2026	Didier Taupin	PS	Sports Instructor

== Population ==
The inhabitants of the commune are known as Anglésiens or Anglésiennes in French.

Historical population
Year	Pop.	±% p.a.
1968	199	—
1975	195	−0.29%
1982	272	+4.87%
1990	310	+1.65%
1999	364	+1.80%
2007	707	+8.65%
2012	843	+3.58%
2017	1,060	+4.69%
2023	1,447	+5.32%
Source: INSEE

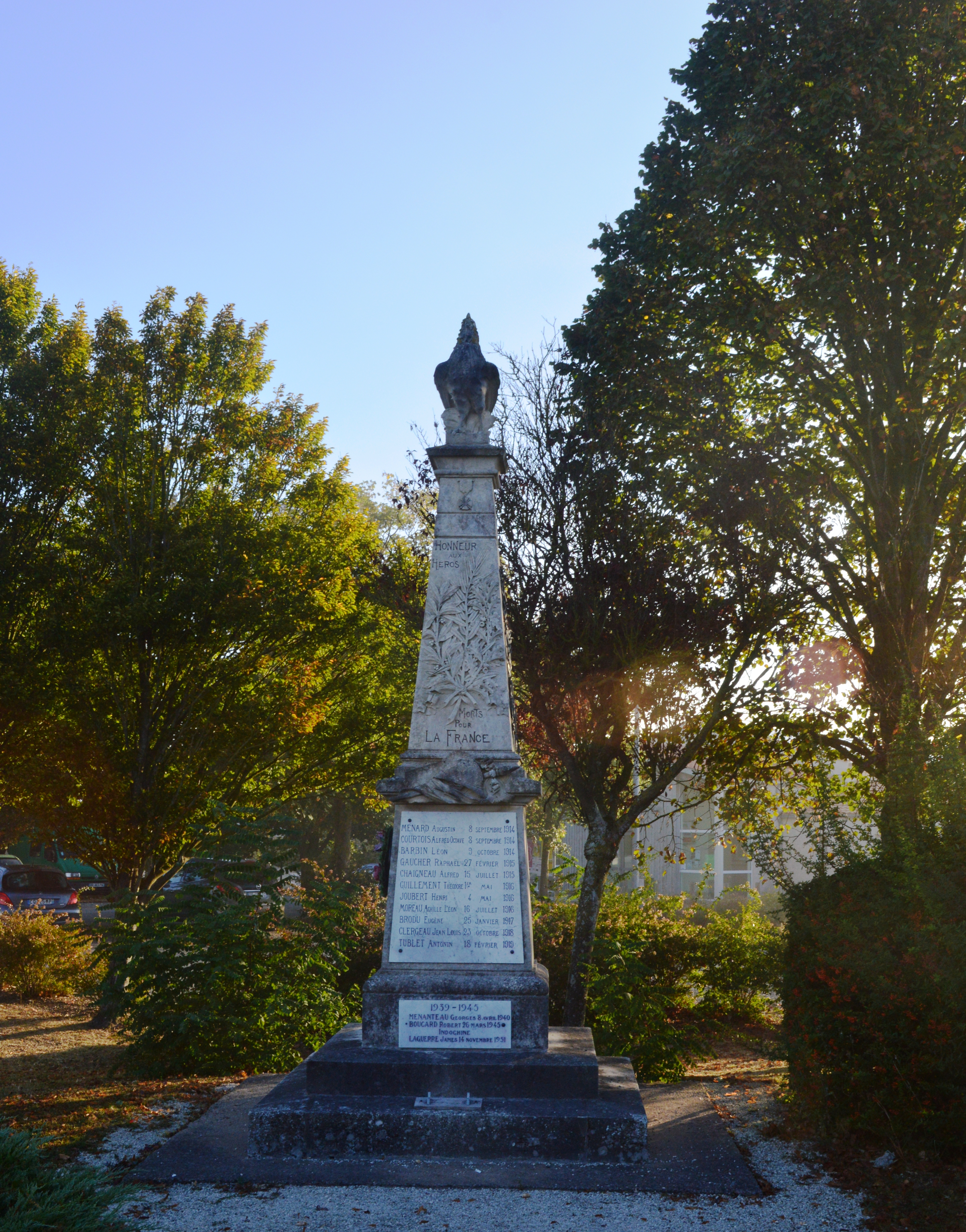
Angliers War Memorial

== Culture and heritage ==
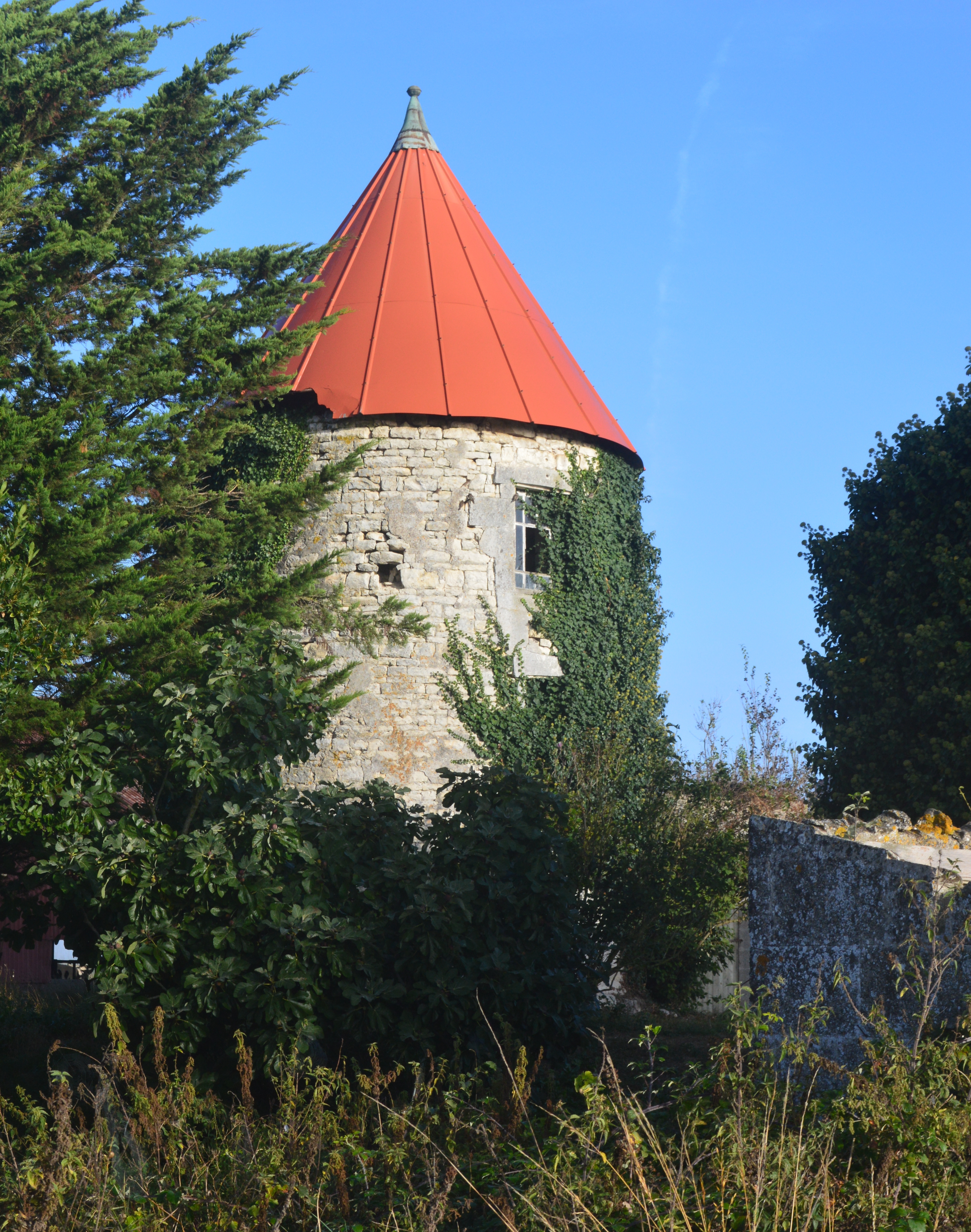
The old Mill

=== Civil heritage ===
The commune has a number of buildings and structures that are registered as historical monuments:

- The Logis de Ré Manor (17th century)
- The Chateau de Ré Manor (18th century)
- A Farmhouse at Saint-Eloi (1903)
- A House at Le Peu (19th century)
- A Farmhouse at Mouche de Ne (1773)
- A House at Les Loges (1866)
- A Mill at Moulin-Gelot (19th century)
- Houses and Farms

=== Religious heritage ===
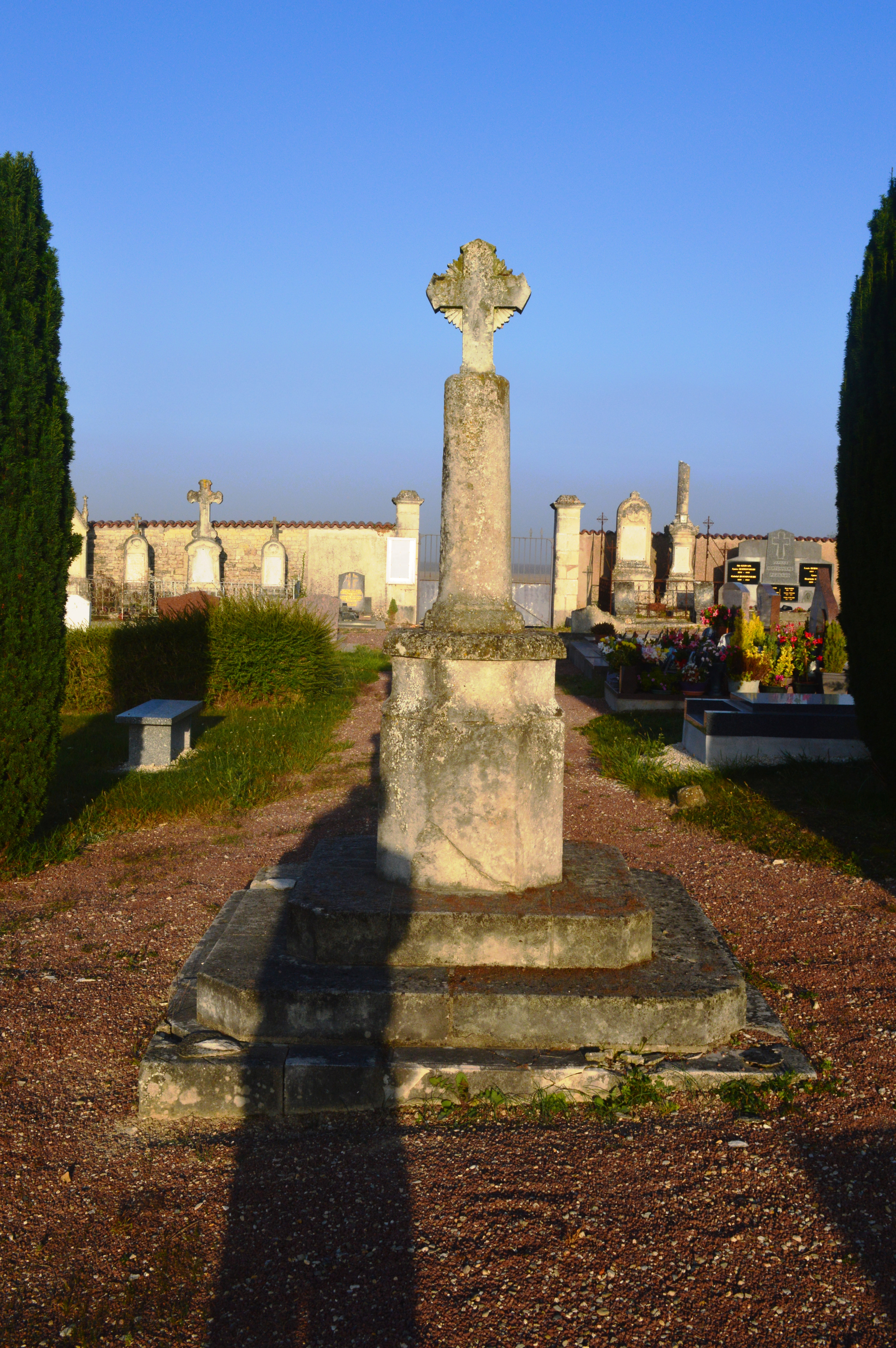
The Cemetery Cross

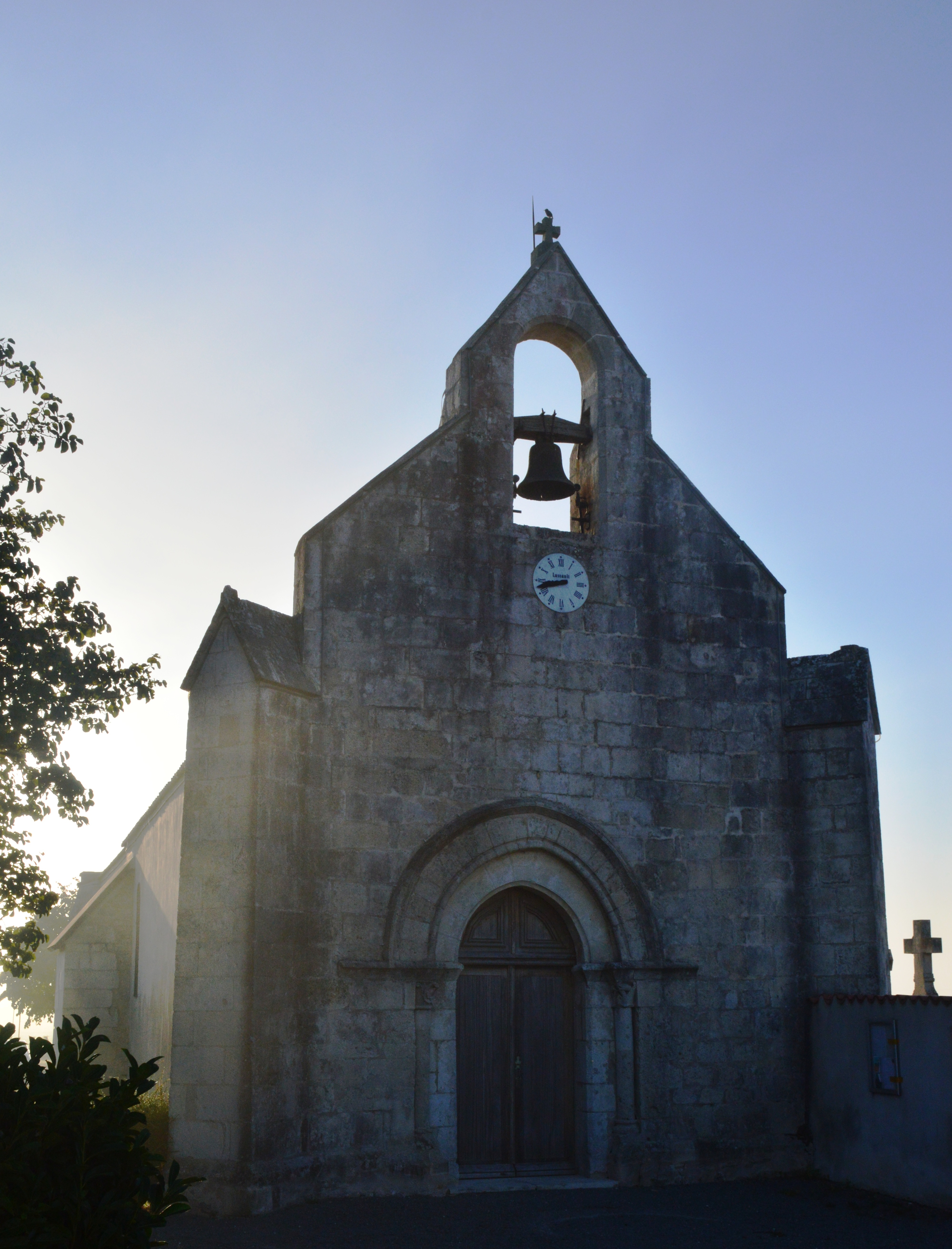
The Priory of Saint Peter

The commune has several religious buildings and structures that are registered as historical monuments:

- A Cemetery Cross (17th century)
- The Priory of Saint Peter (12th century). The Priory contains many items that are registered as historical objects:
  - A Baptismal font (1651)
  - A Stained glass window: Saint Bernadette (20th century)
  - 3 Stained glass windows: Sacred heart of Jesus, Virgin and child, and Saint Peter (1901)
  - A Bronze Bell (1641)
  - A Chalice (19th century)
  - A Pail for holy water (19th century)
  - A Chalice (19th century)
  - A Thurible (18th century)
  - A Painting: Saint Peter (19th century)
  - 2 Statues: Saint Joseph with the child Jesus and Saint Theresa of Lisieux (20th century)
  - A Prie-dieu (19th century)
  - A Stoup (17th century)
  - A Baptismal font (1651)
  - An Altar and Tabernacle (19th century)
  - A Stained glass window: The Theological virtues (19th century)

== See also ==
- Communes of the Charente-Maritime department
