= Taugon =

- Commune
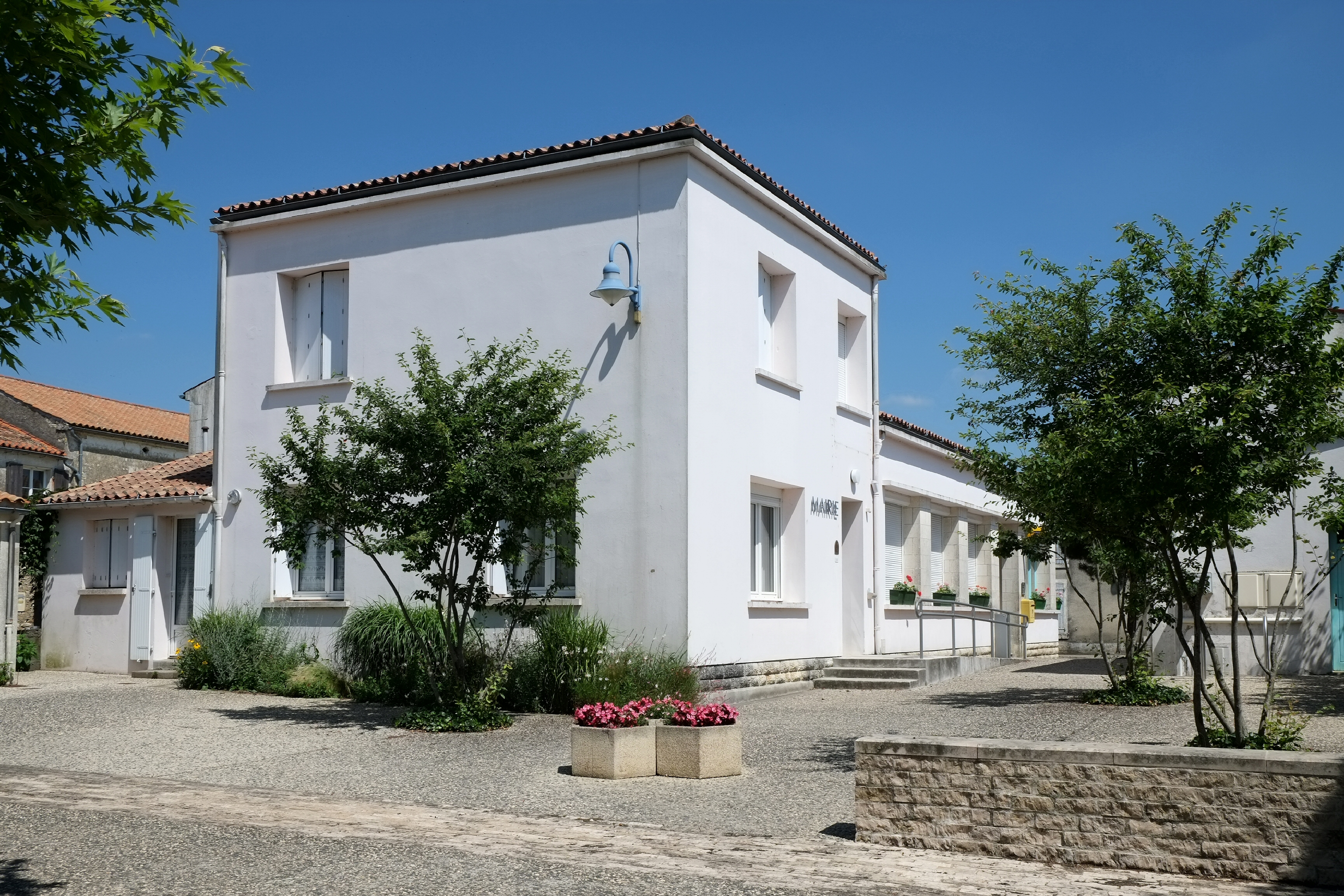
- The town hall in Taugon
- Location of Taugon
- Location within France Location within Nouvelle-Aquitaine
- Coordinates: 46°18′33″N 0°49′59″W
- Country: France
- Region: Nouvelle-Aquitaine
- Department: Charente-Maritime
- Arrondissement: La Rochelle
- Canton: Marans

Government
  - Mayor (2020–2026): Gérard Bouhier
- Area^{1}: 15.7 km^{2} (6.1 sq mi)
- Elevation: 8 m (26 ft)
- Highest elevation: 8 m (26 ft)
- Lowest elevation: 1 m (3.3 ft)
- Population (2023): 772
  - Density: 49.2/km^{2} (127/sq mi)
- Time zone: UTC+01:00 (CET)
  - Summer (DST): UTC+02:00 (CEST)
- INSEE/Postal code: 17439 /17170
- ^{1} French Land Register data, which excludes lakes, ponds, glaciers > 1 km^{2} (0.386 sq mi or 247 acres) and river estuaries.

Taugon (French pronunciation: [toɡɔ̃]) is a commune in the Charente-Maritime department in the Nouvelle-Aquitaine region in southwestern France.

== Population ==
Historical population
Year	Pop.	±% p.a.
1968	682	—
1975	653	−0.62%
1982	674	+0.45%
1990	610	−1.24%
1999	612	+0.04%
2007	698	+1.66%
2012	823	+3.35%
2017	791	−0.79%
2023	772	−0.40%
Source: INSEE

== See also ==
- Communes of the Charente-Maritime department
