= Saint-Sauveur-d'Aunis =

- Commune
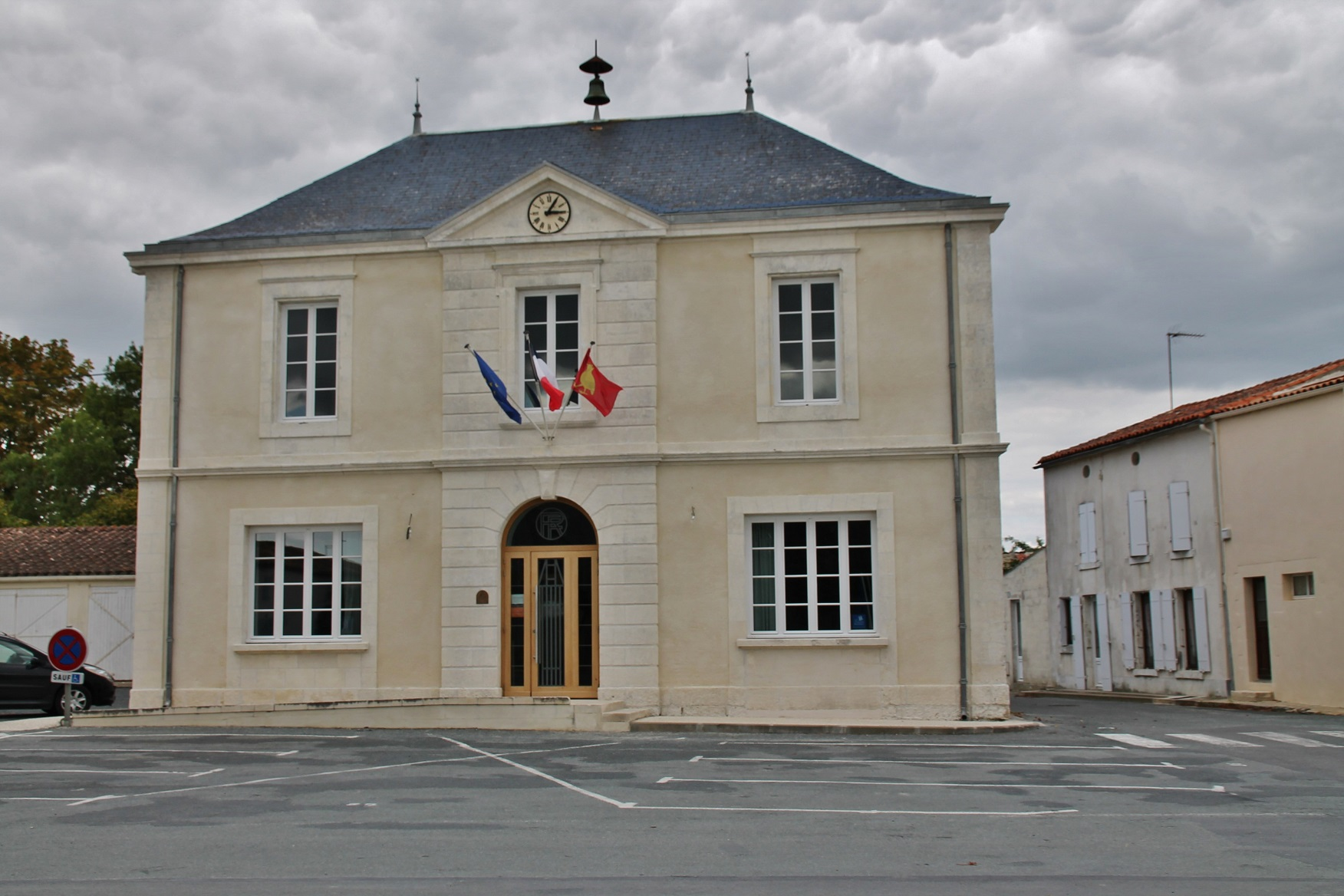
- The town hall in Saint-Sauveur-d'Aunis
- Location of Saint-Sauveur-d'Aunis
- Location within France Location within Nouvelle-Aquitaine
- Coordinates: 46°12′59″N 0°53′06″W
- Country: France
- Region: Nouvelle-Aquitaine
- Department: Charente-Maritime
- Arrondissement: La Rochelle
- Canton: Marans

Government
  - Mayor (2020–2026): Alain Fontanaud
- Area^{1}: 19.66 km^{2} (7.59 sq mi)
- Elevation: 6 m (20 ft)
- Highest elevation: 35 m (115 ft)
- Lowest elevation: 2 m (6.6 ft)
- Population (2023): 2,026
  - Density: 103.1/km^{2} (266.9/sq mi)
- Time zone: UTC+01:00 (CET)
  - Summer (DST): UTC+02:00 (CEST)
- INSEE/Postal code: 17396 /17540
- ^{1} French Land Register data, which excludes lakes, ponds, glaciers > 1 km^{2} (0.386 sq mi or 247 acres) and river estuaries.

Saint-Sauveur-d'Aunis (French pronunciation: [sɛ̃ sovœʁ doni(s)], literally Saint-Sauveur of Aunis) is a commune in the Charente-Maritime department in the Nouvelle-Aquitaine region in southwestern France.

== Population ==
Historical population
Year	Pop.	±% p.a.
1968	731	—
1975	731	+0.00%
1982	922	+3.37%
1990	899	−0.32%
1999	1,069	+1.94%
2007	1,410	+3.52%
2012	1,633	+2.98%
2017	1,704	+0.85%
2023	2,026	+2.93%
Source: INSEE

== See also ==
- Communes of the Charente-Maritime department
