= Saint-Jean-de-Liversay =

- Commune
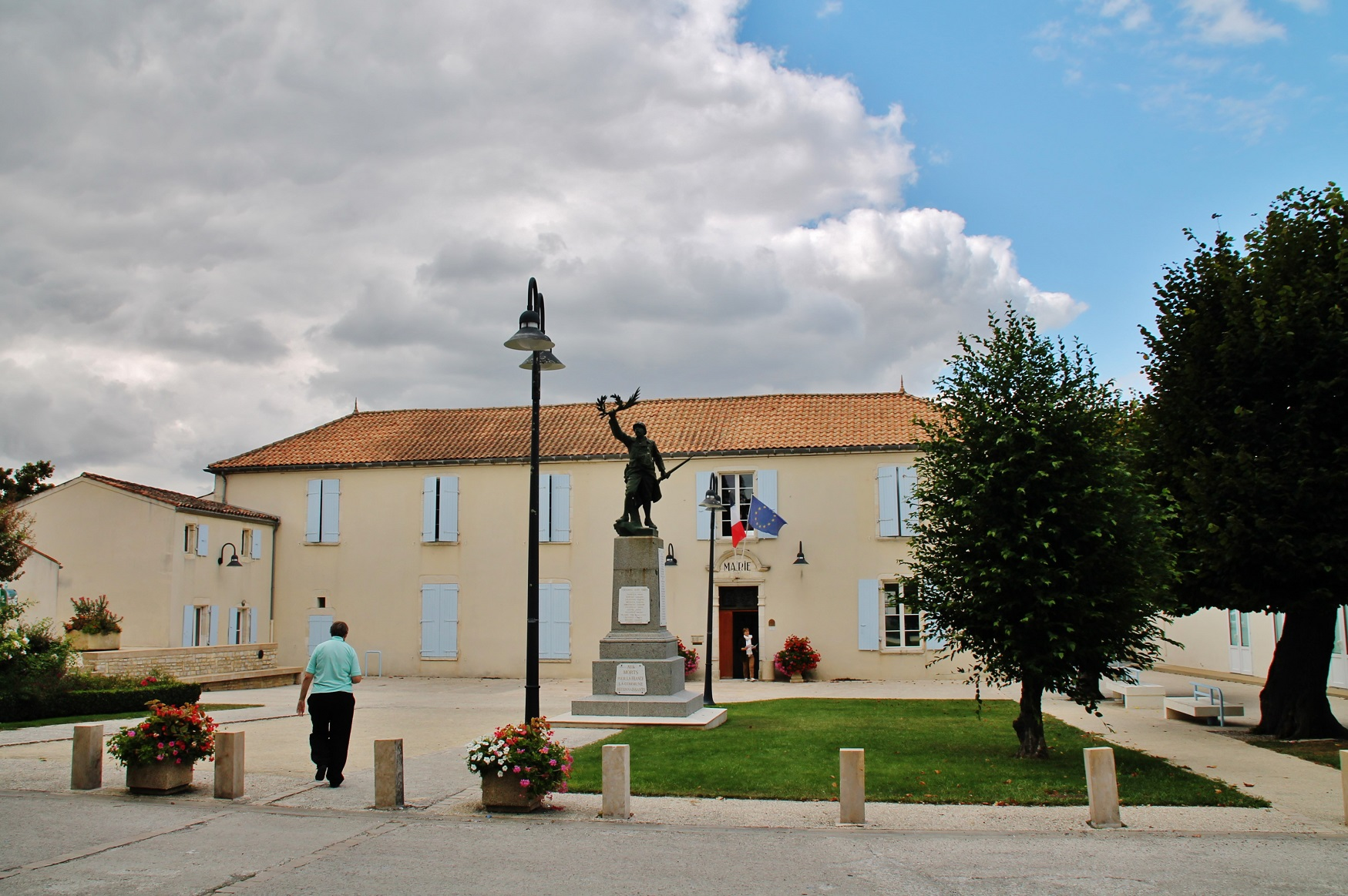
- The town hall in Saint-Jean-de-Liversay
- Location of Saint-Jean-de-Liversay
- Location within France Location within Nouvelle-Aquitaine
- Coordinates: 46°16′11″N 0°52′24″W
- Country: France
- Region: Nouvelle-Aquitaine
- Department: Charente-Maritime
- Arrondissement: La Rochelle
- Canton: Marans

Government
  - Mayor (2024–2026): Alexandre Trouche
- Area^{1}: 41.42 km^{2} (15.99 sq mi)
- Elevation: 10 m (33 ft)
- Highest elevation: 39 m (128 ft)
- Lowest elevation: 0 m (0 ft)
- Population (2023): 3,063
  - Density: 73.95/km^{2} (191.5/sq mi)
- Time zone: UTC+01:00 (CET)
  - Summer (DST): UTC+02:00 (CEST)
- INSEE/Postal code: 17349 /17170
- ^{1} French Land Register data, which excludes lakes, ponds, glaciers > 1 km^{2} (0.386 sq mi or 247 acres) and river estuaries.

Saint-Jean-de-Liversay (French pronunciation: [sɛ̃ ʒɑ̃ də livɛʁsɛ]) is a commune in the Charente-Maritime department in the Nouvelle-Aquitaine region in southwestern France.

== Population ==
Historical population
Year	Pop.	±% p.a.
1968	1,300	—
1975	1,424	+1.31%
1982	1,508	+0.82%
1990	1,627	+0.95%
1999	1,697	+0.47%
2007	2,229	+3.47%
2012	2,570	+2.89%
2017	2,891	+2.38%
2023	3,063	+0.97%
Source: INSEE

== Personalities ==
- Jean René Constant Quoy, marine doctor and naturalist

== See also ==
- Communes of the Charente-Maritime department
