= La Grève-sur-Mignon =

- Commune
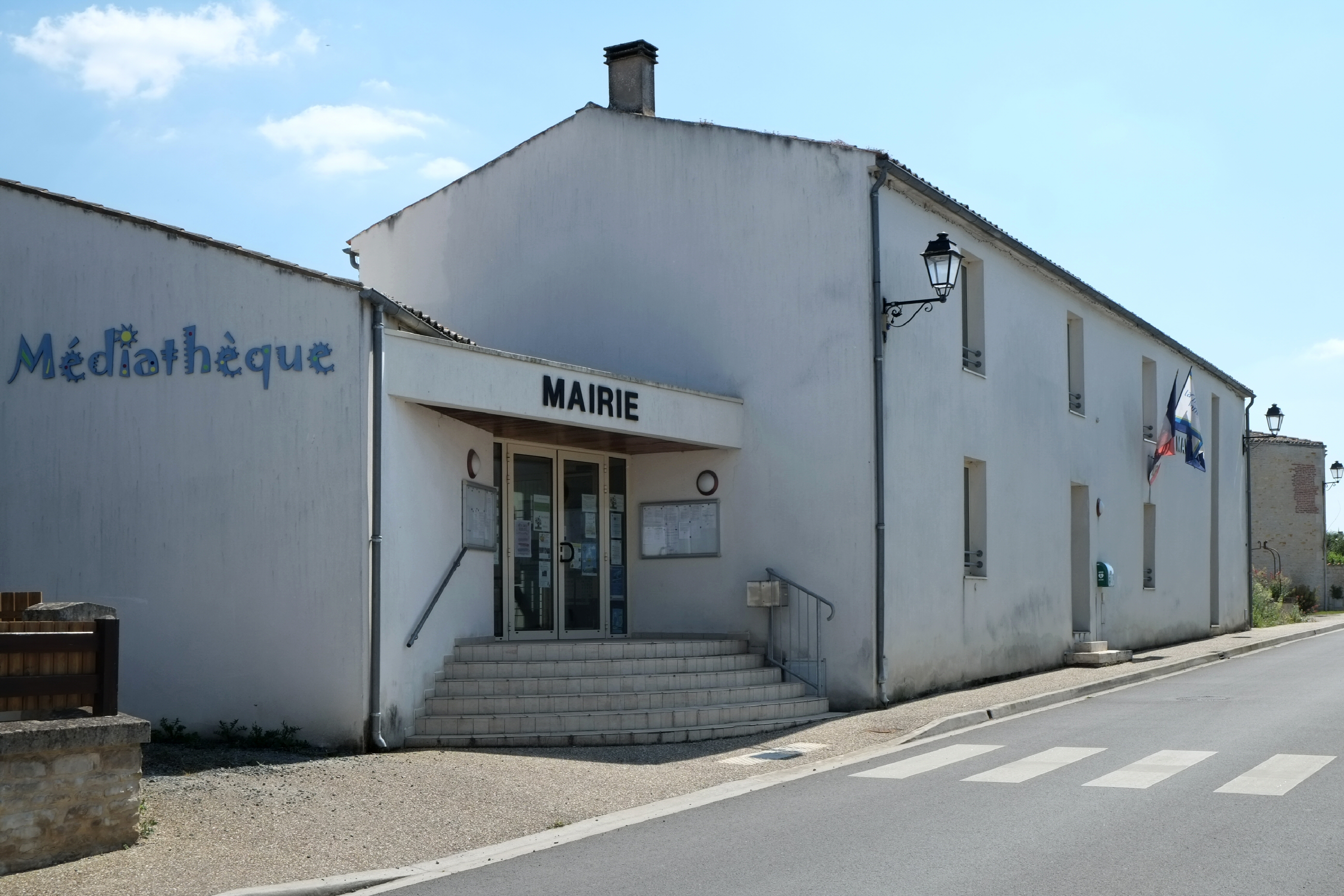
- The town hall in La Grève-sur-Mignon
- Location of La Grève-sur-Mignon
- Location within France Location within Nouvelle-Aquitaine
- Coordinates: 46°15′05″N 0°45′45″W
- Country: France
- Region: Nouvelle-Aquitaine
- Department: Charente-Maritime
- Arrondissement: La Rochelle
- Canton: Marans

Government
  - Mayor (2024–2026): Nicolas Boncens
- Area^{1}: 11.48 km^{2} (4.43 sq mi)
- Elevation: 8 m (26 ft)
- Highest elevation: 31 m (102 ft)
- Lowest elevation: 1 m (3.3 ft)
- Population (2023): 577
  - Density: 50.3/km^{2} (130/sq mi)
- Time zone: UTC+01:00 (CET)
  - Summer (DST): UTC+02:00 (CEST)
- INSEE/Postal code: 17182 /17170
- ^{1} French Land Register data, which excludes lakes, ponds, glaciers > 1 km^{2} (0.386 sq mi or 247 acres) and river estuaries.

La Grève-sur-Mignon (French pronunciation: [la ɡʁɛv syʁ miɲɔ̃]) is a commune in the Charente-Maritime department in southwestern France.

Before 1928, it was known as Saint-Martin-de-Villeneuve.

== Population ==
Historical population
Year	Pop.	±% p.a.
1968	366	—
1975	305	−2.57%
1982	298	−0.33%
1990	317	+0.78%
1999	361	+1.45%
2007	422	+1.97%
2012	520	+4.26%
2017	563	+1.60%
2023	577	+0.41%
Source: INSEE

== Personalities ==
La Grève-sur-Mignon was the birthplace of:

- Lova Moor, dancer and singer

== See also ==
- Communes of the Charente-Maritime department
