= Canton of Rochefort =

French administrative division

Coordinates: 45.94°N 0.96°W

The canton of Rochefort is an administrative division of the Charente-Maritime department, western France. It was created at the French canton reorganisation which came into effect in March 2015. Its seat is in Rochefort.

It consists of the following communes:

1. Rochefort
