= La Ronde, Charente-Maritime =

La Ronde
- Commune
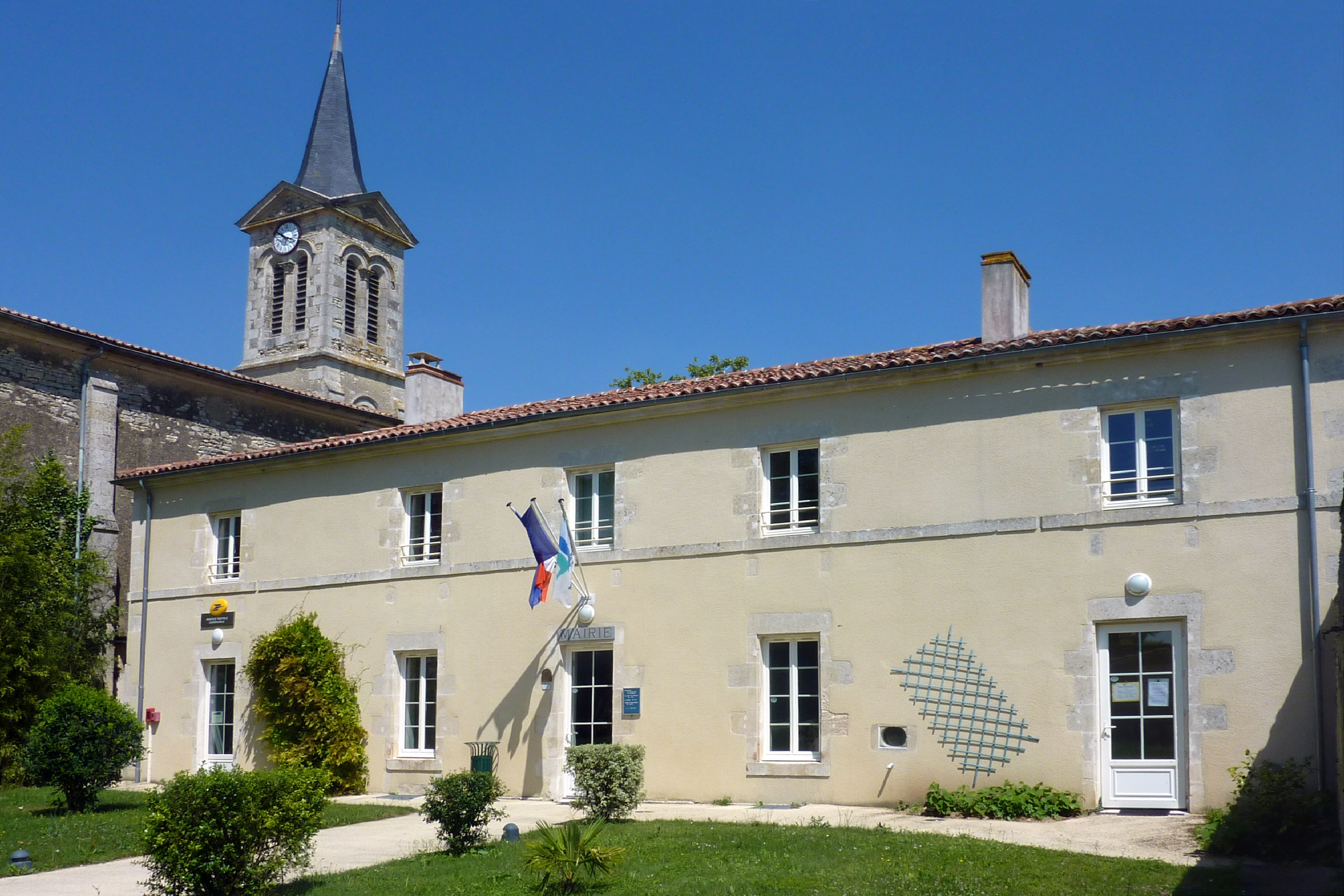
- The town hall in La Ronde

- Coat of arms
- Location of La Ronde
- Location within France Location within Nouvelle-Aquitaine
- Coordinates: 46°18′03″N 0°48′23″W
- Country: France
- Region: Nouvelle-Aquitaine
- Department: Charente-Maritime
- Arrondissement: La Rochelle
- Canton: Marans

Government
  - Mayor (2020–2026): Jean-Pierre Servant
- Area^{1}: 20.79 km^{2} (8.03 sq mi)
- Elevation: 9 m (30 ft)
- Highest elevation: 12 m (39 ft)
- Lowest elevation: 1 m (3.3 ft)
- Population (2023): 997
  - Density: 48.0/km^{2} (124/sq mi)
- Time zone: UTC+01:00 (CET)
  - Summer (DST): UTC+02:00 (CEST)
- INSEE/Postal code: 17303 /17170
- ^{1} French Land Register data, which excludes lakes, ponds, glaciers > 1 km^{2} (0.386 sq mi or 247 acres) and river estuaries.

La Ronde (French pronunciation: [la ʁɔ̃d]) is a commune in the Charente-Maritime department in southwestern France.

== Population ==
Historical population
Year	Pop.	±% p.a.
1968	787	—
1975	718	−1.30%
1982	679	−0.79%
1990	703	+0.44%
1999	744	+0.63%
2007	873	+2.02%
2012	1,104	+4.81%
2017	1,050	−1.00%
2023	997	−0.86%
Source: INSEE

== See also ==
- Communes of the Charente-Maritime department
