= Villedoux =

- Commune
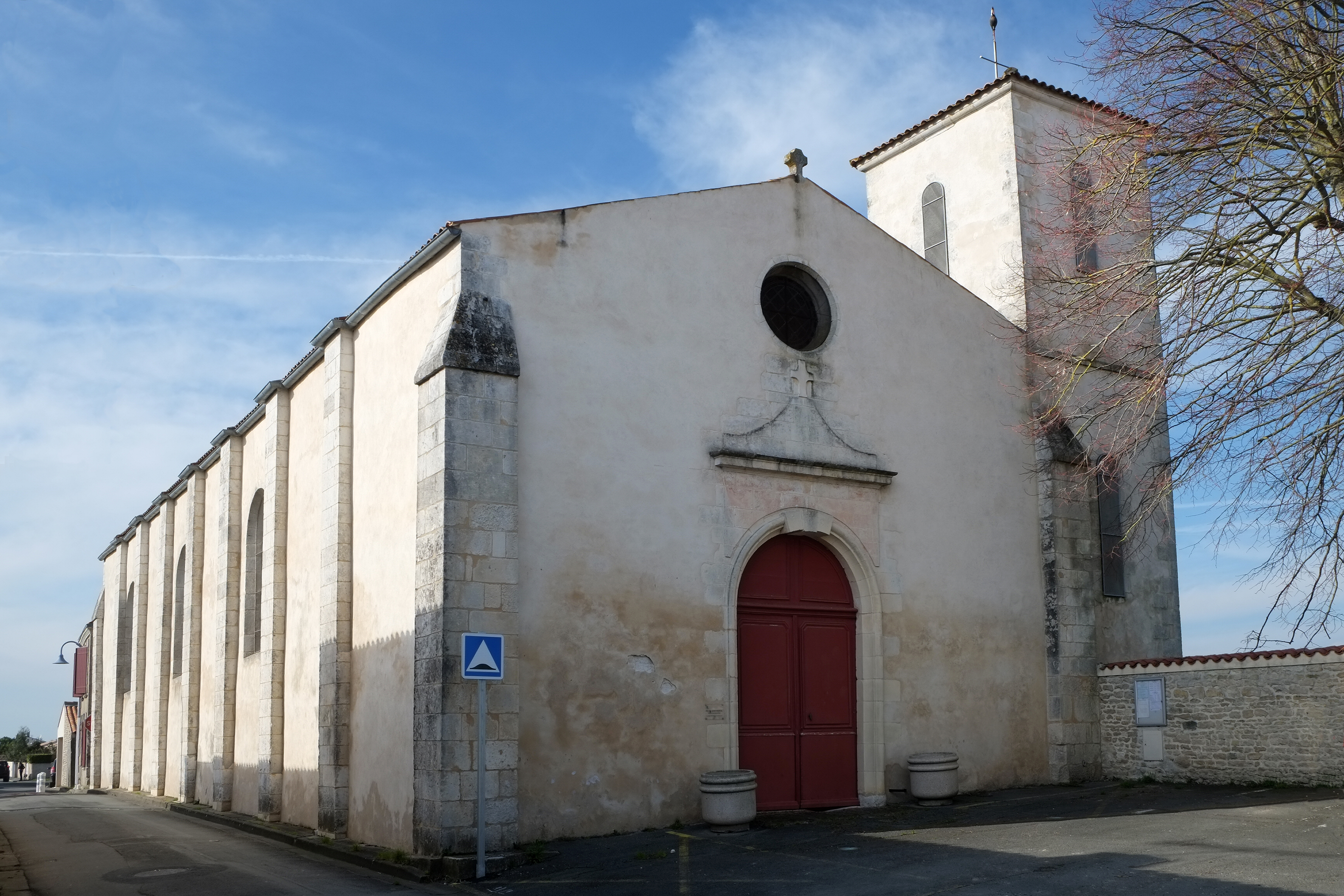
- The church in Villedoux
- Location of Villedoux
- Location within France Location within Nouvelle-Aquitaine
- Coordinates: 46°14′31″N 1°03′57″W
- Country: France
- Region: Nouvelle-Aquitaine
- Department: Charente-Maritime
- Arrondissement: La Rochelle
- Canton: Marans

Government
  - Mayor (2020–2026): François Vendittozzi
- Area^{1}: 15.84 km^{2} (6.12 sq mi)
- Elevation: 8 m (26 ft)
- Highest elevation: 21 m (69 ft)
- Lowest elevation: 0 m (0 ft)
- Population (2023): 2,166
  - Density: 136.7/km^{2} (354.2/sq mi)
- Time zone: UTC+01:00 (CET)
  - Summer (DST): UTC+02:00 (CEST)
- INSEE/Postal code: 17472 /17230
- ^{1} French Land Register data, which excludes lakes, ponds, glaciers > 1 km^{2} (0.386 sq mi or 247 acres) and river estuaries.

Villedoux (French pronunciation: [vildu]) is a commune in the Charente-Maritime department in the Nouvelle-Aquitaine region in southwestern France.

== Population ==
Historical population
Year	Pop.	±% p.a.
1968	384	—
1975	767	+10.39%
1982	715	−1.00%
1990	958	+3.72%
1999	934	−0.28%
2007	1,114	+2.23%
2012	1,892	+11.18%
2017	2,237	+3.41%
2023	2,166	−0.54%
Source: INSEE

== See also ==
- Communes of the Charente-Maritime department
