= La Laigne =

- Commune
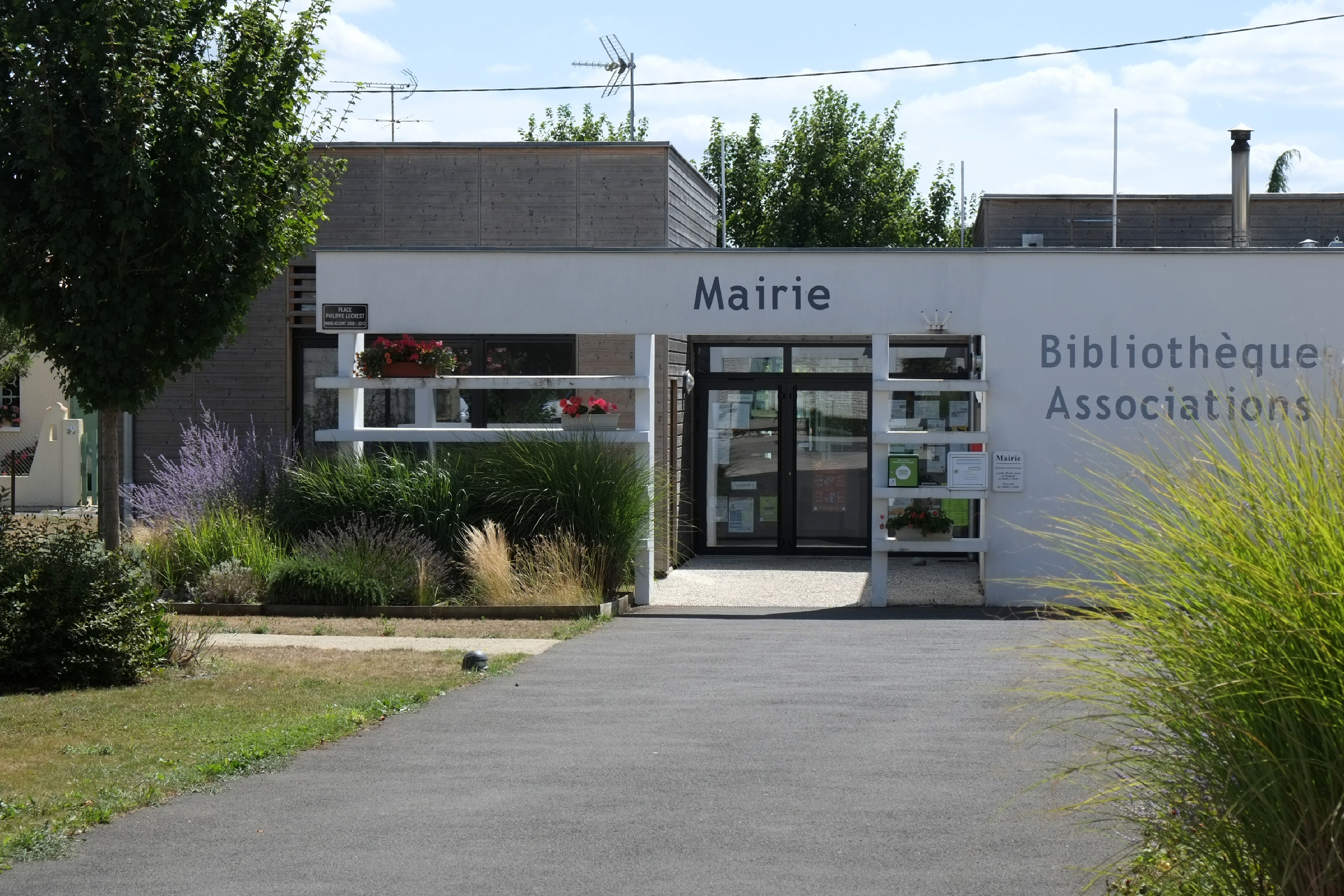
- The town hall in La Laigne

- Coat of arms
- Location of La Laigne
- Location within France Location within Nouvelle-Aquitaine
- Coordinates: 46°12′54″N 0°45′24″W
- Country: France
- Region: Nouvelle-Aquitaine
- Department: Charente-Maritime
- Arrondissement: La Rochelle
- Canton: Marans

Government
  - Mayor (2020–2026): Philippe Pelletier
- Area^{1}: 4.26 km^{2} (1.64 sq mi)
- Elevation: 15 m (49 ft)
- Highest elevation: 29 m (95 ft)
- Lowest elevation: 3 m (9.8 ft)
- Population (2023): 500
  - Density: 120/km^{2} (300/sq mi)
- Time zone: UTC+01:00 (CET)
  - Summer (DST): UTC+02:00 (CEST)
- INSEE/Postal code: 17201 /17170
- ^{1} French Land Register data, which excludes lakes, ponds, glaciers > 1 km^{2} (0.386 sq mi or 247 acres) and river estuaries.

La Laigne (French pronunciation: [la lɛɲ]) is a commune in the Charente-Maritime department in southwestern France.

== Population ==
Historical population
Year	Pop.	±% p.a.
1968	336	—
1975	295	−1.84%
1982	272	−1.15%
1990	243	−1.40%
1999	275	+1.38%
2007	265	−0.46%
2012	437	+10.52%
2017	474	+1.64%
2023	500	+0.89%
Source: INSEE

== See also ==
- Communes of the Charente-Maritime department
