= Saint-Cyr-du-Doret =

- Commune
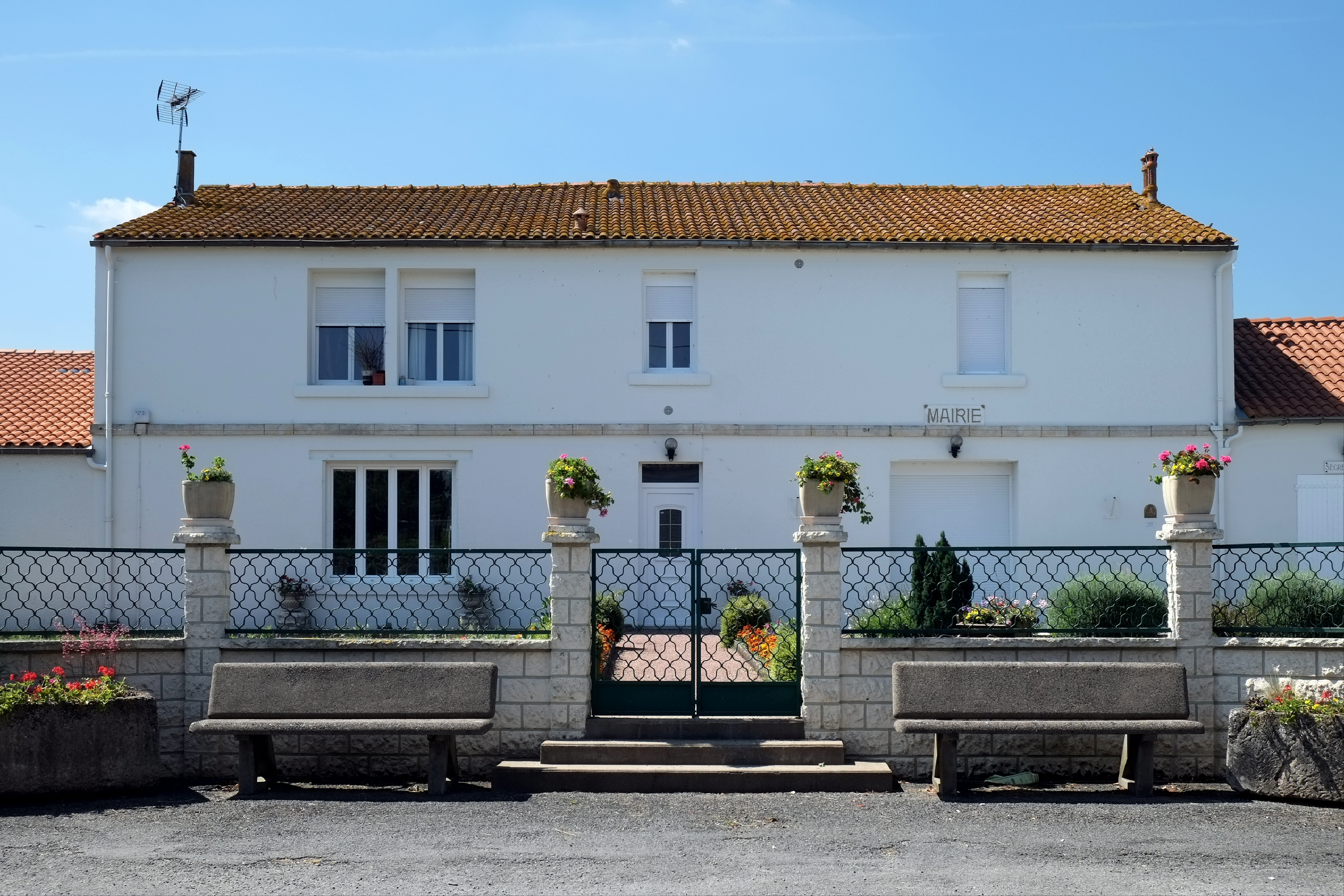
- The town hall in Saint-Cyr-du-Doret
- Location of Saint-Cyr-du-Doret
- Location within France Location within Nouvelle-Aquitaine
- Coordinates: 46°16′48″N 0°48′28″W
- Country: France
- Region: Nouvelle-Aquitaine
- Department: Charente-Maritime
- Arrondissement: La Rochelle
- Canton: Marans

Government
  - Mayor (2020–2026): Gislaine Got
- Area^{1}: 17.08 km^{2} (6.59 sq mi)
- Elevation: 7 m (23 ft)
- Highest elevation: 36 m (118 ft)
- Lowest elevation: 1 m (3.3 ft)
- Population (2023): 681
  - Density: 39.9/km^{2} (103/sq mi)
- Time zone: UTC+01:00 (CET)
  - Summer (DST): UTC+02:00 (CEST)
- INSEE/Postal code: 17322 /17170
- ^{1} French Land Register data, which excludes lakes, ponds, glaciers > 1 km^{2} (0.386 sq mi or 247 acres) and river estuaries.

Saint-Cyr-du-Doret (French pronunciation: [sɛ̃ siʁ dy dɔʁɛ]) is a commune in the Charente-Maritime department in the Nouvelle-Aquitaine region in southwestern France.

== Population ==
Historical population
Year	Pop.	±% p.a.
1968	377	—
1975	345	−1.26%
1982	283	−2.79%
1990	340	+2.32%
1999	365	+0.79%
2007	549	+5.23%
2012	589	+1.42%
2017	656	+2.18%
2023	681	+0.63%
Source: INSEE

== See also ==
- Communes of the Charente-Maritime department
