= Le Gué-d'Alleré =

- Commune
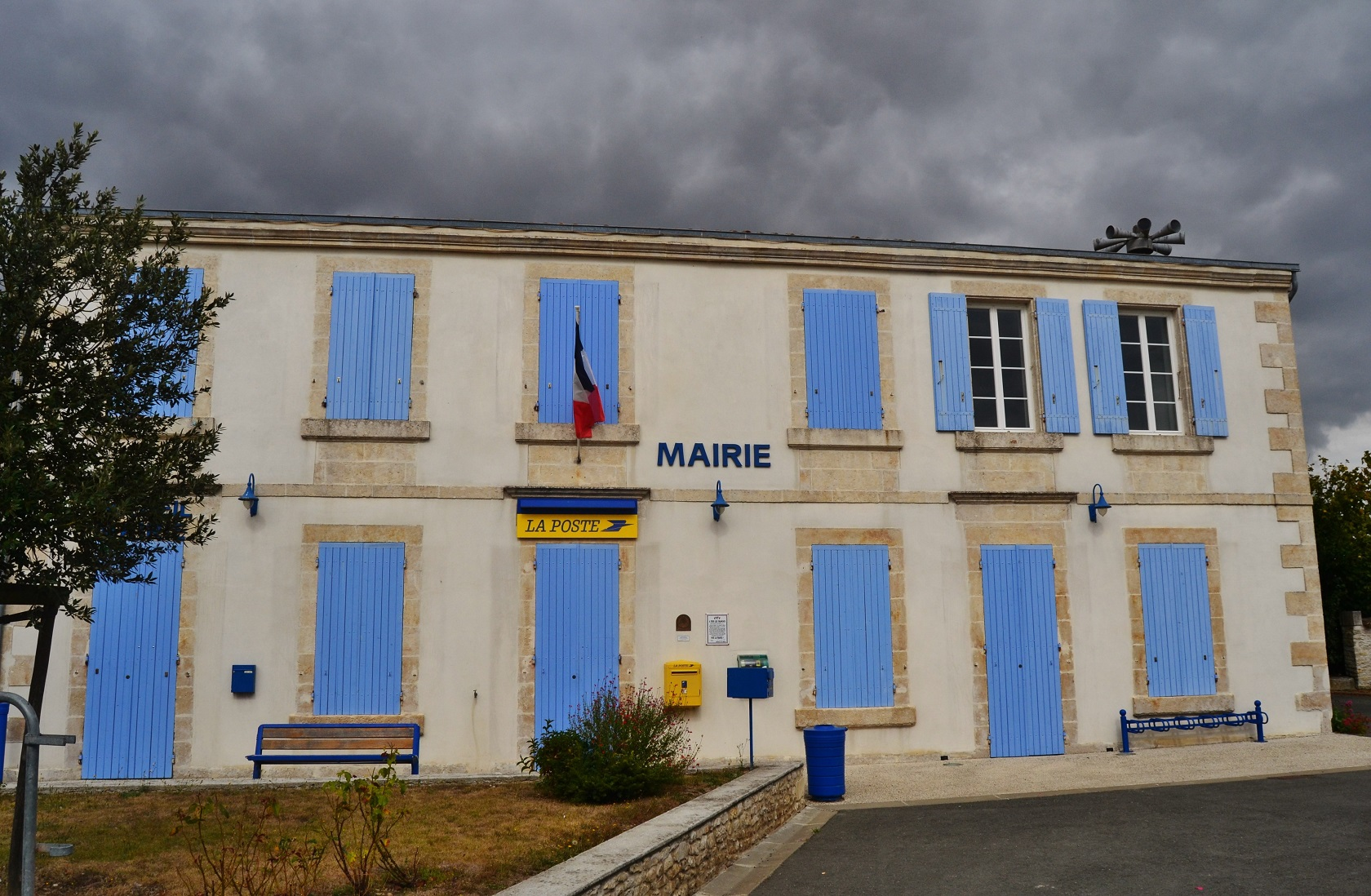
- The town hall in Le Gué-d'Alleré
- Location of Le Gué-d'Alleré
- Location within France Location within Nouvelle-Aquitaine
- Coordinates: 46°11′17″N 0°51′35″W
- Country: France
- Region: Nouvelle-Aquitaine
- Department: Charente-Maritime
- Arrondissement: La Rochelle
- Canton: Marans

Government
  - Mayor (2020–2026): Sylvain Augeraud
- Area^{1}: 7.55 km^{2} (2.92 sq mi)
- Elevation: 8 m (26 ft)
- Highest elevation: 21 m (69 ft)
- Lowest elevation: 3 m (9.8 ft)
- Population (2023): 1,113
  - Density: 147/km^{2} (382/sq mi)
- Time zone: UTC+01:00 (CET)
  - Summer (DST): UTC+02:00 (CEST)
- INSEE/Postal code: 17186 /17540
- ^{1} French Land Register data, which excludes lakes, ponds, glaciers > 1 km^{2} (0.386 sq mi or 247 acres) and river estuaries.

Le Gué-d'Alleré (French pronunciation: [lə ɡe dalʁe]) is a commune in the Charente-Maritime department in southwestern France.

== Population ==
Historical population
Year	Pop.	±% p.a.
1968	405	—
1975	434	+0.99%
1982	427	−0.23%
1990	440	+0.38%
1999	514	+1.74%
2007	665	+3.27%
2012	729	+1.85%
2017	928	+4.95%
2023	1,113	+3.08%
Source: INSEE

== See also ==
- Communes of the Charente-Maritime department
