= Ferrières, Charente-Maritime =

Ferrières
- Commune
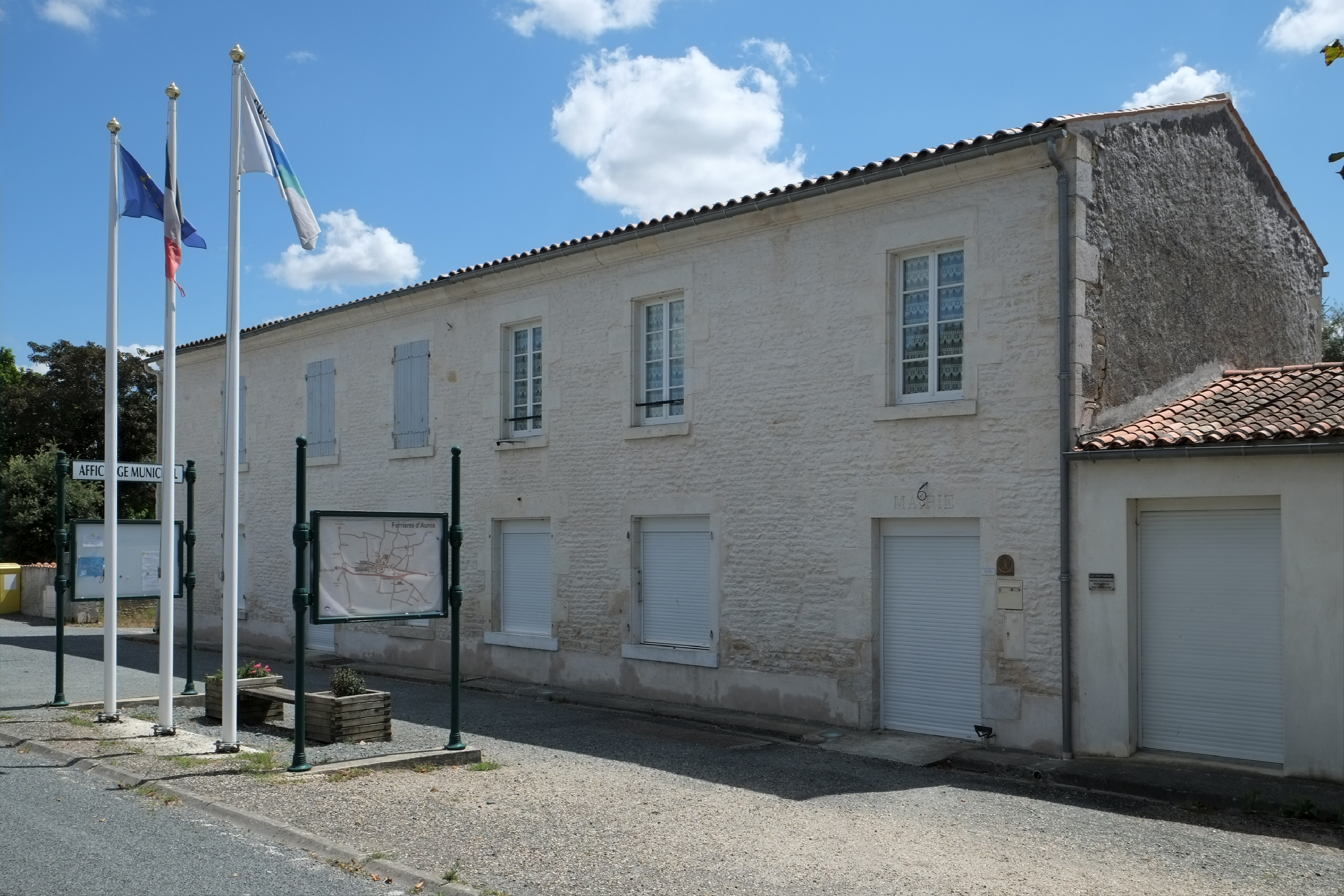
- The town hall in Ferrières
- Location of Ferrières
- Location within France Location within Nouvelle-Aquitaine
- Coordinates: 46°13′42″N 0°51′33″W
- Country: France
- Region: Nouvelle-Aquitaine
- Department: Charente-Maritime
- Arrondissement: La Rochelle
- Canton: Marans

Government
  - Mayor (2020–2026): Bernard Besson
- Area^{1}: 7.59 km^{2} (2.93 sq mi)
- Highest elevation: 41 m (135 ft)
- Lowest elevation: 15 m (49 ft)
- Population (2023): 1,573
  - Density: 207/km^{2} (537/sq mi)
- Time zone: UTC+01:00 (CET)
  - Summer (DST): UTC+02:00 (CEST)
- INSEE/Postal code: 17158 /17170
- ^{1} French Land Register data, which excludes lakes, ponds, glaciers > 1 km^{2} (0.386 sq mi or 247 acres) and river estuaries.

Ferrières (French pronunciation: [fɛʁjɛʁ]) is a commune in the Charente-Maritime department in southwestern France.

== Population ==
Historical population
| Year | Pop. | ±% p.a. |
|---|---|---|
| 1968 | 300 | — |
| 1975 | 282 | −0.88% |
| 1982 | 270 | −0.62% |
| 1990 | 306 | +1.58% |
| 1999 | 362 | +1.88% |
| 2007 | 691 | +8.42% |
| 2012 | 796 | +2.87% |
| 2017 | 922 | +2.98% |
| 2023 | 1,573 | +9.31% |
Source: INSEE

== See also ==
- Communes of the Charente-Maritime department
