= Cram-Chaban =

- Commune
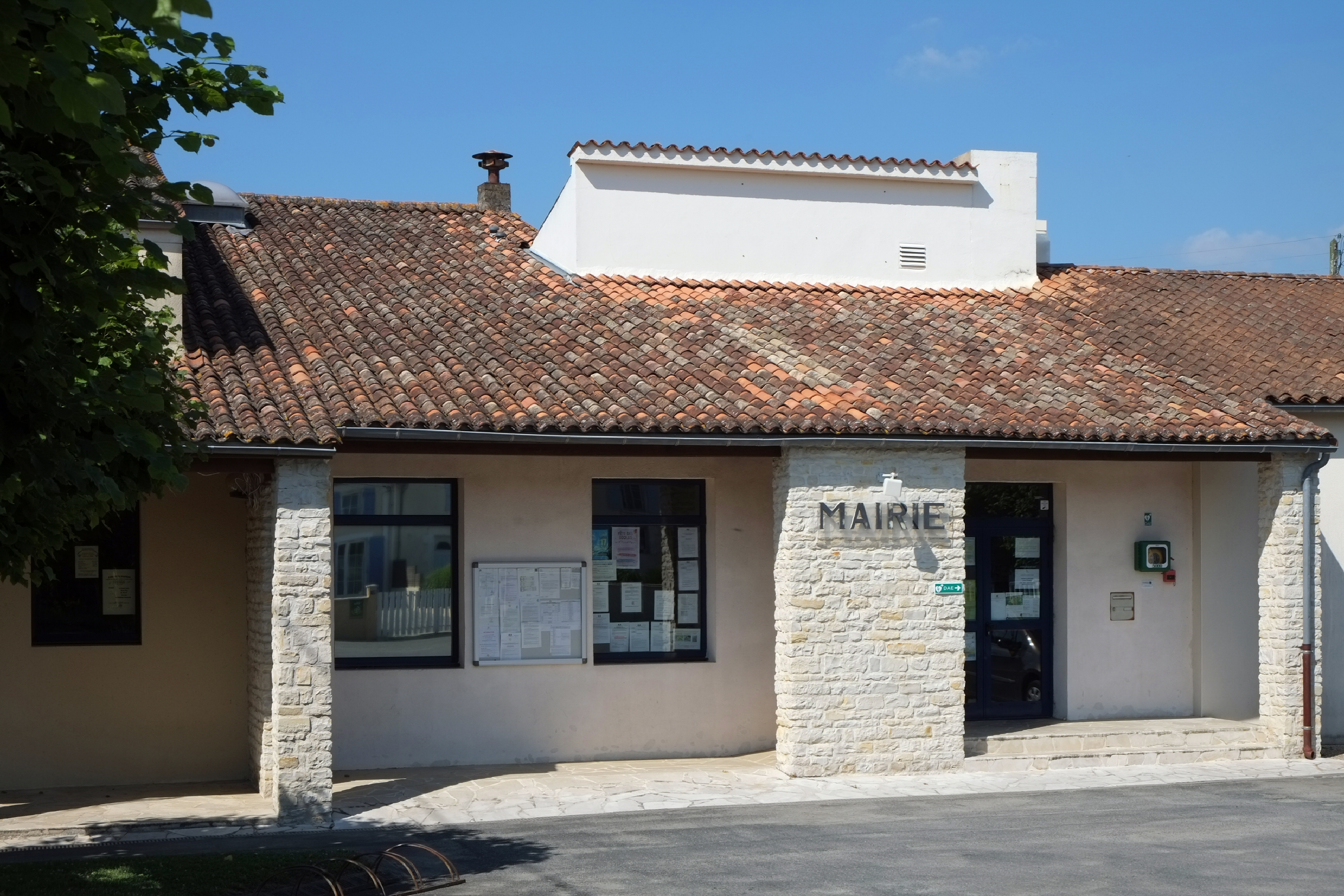
- The town hall in Cram-Chaban
- Location of Cram-Chaban
- Location within France Location within Nouvelle-Aquitaine
- Coordinates: 46°13′13″N 0°43′14″W
- Country: France
- Region: Nouvelle-Aquitaine
- Department: Charente-Maritime
- Arrondissement: La Rochelle
- Canton: Marans

Government
  - Mayor (2020–2026): Laurent Renaud
- Area^{1}: 16.06 km^{2} (6.20 sq mi)
- Elevation: 10 m (33 ft)
- Highest elevation: 33 m (108 ft)
- Lowest elevation: 1 m (3.3 ft)
- Population (2023): 654
  - Density: 40.7/km^{2} (105/sq mi)
- Time zone: UTC+01:00 (CET)
  - Summer (DST): UTC+02:00 (CEST)
- INSEE/Postal code: 17132 /17170
- ^{1} French Land Register data, which excludes lakes, ponds, glaciers > 1 km^{2} (0.386 sq mi or 247 acres) and river estuaries.

Cram-Chaban (French pronunciation: [kʁɑ̃ ʃabɑ̃]; known as Cramchaban until 31 December 2022) is a commune in the Charente-Maritime department, Nouvelle-Aquitaine, France.

== Population ==
Historical population
| Year | Pop. | ±% p.a. |
|---|---|---|
| 1968 | 619 | — |
| 1975 | 503 | −2.92% |
| 1982 | 534 | +0.86% |
| 1990 | 516 | −0.43% |
| 1999 | 515 | −0.02% |
| 2007 | 567 | +1.21% |
| 2012 | 631 | +2.16% |
| 2017 | 655 | +0.75% |
| 2023 | 654 | −0.03% |
Source: INSEE

Its inhabitants are known as Cramois or Cramchabanais in French.

== See also ==
- Communes of the Charente-Maritime department
