= Saint-Ouen-d'Aunis =

- Commune
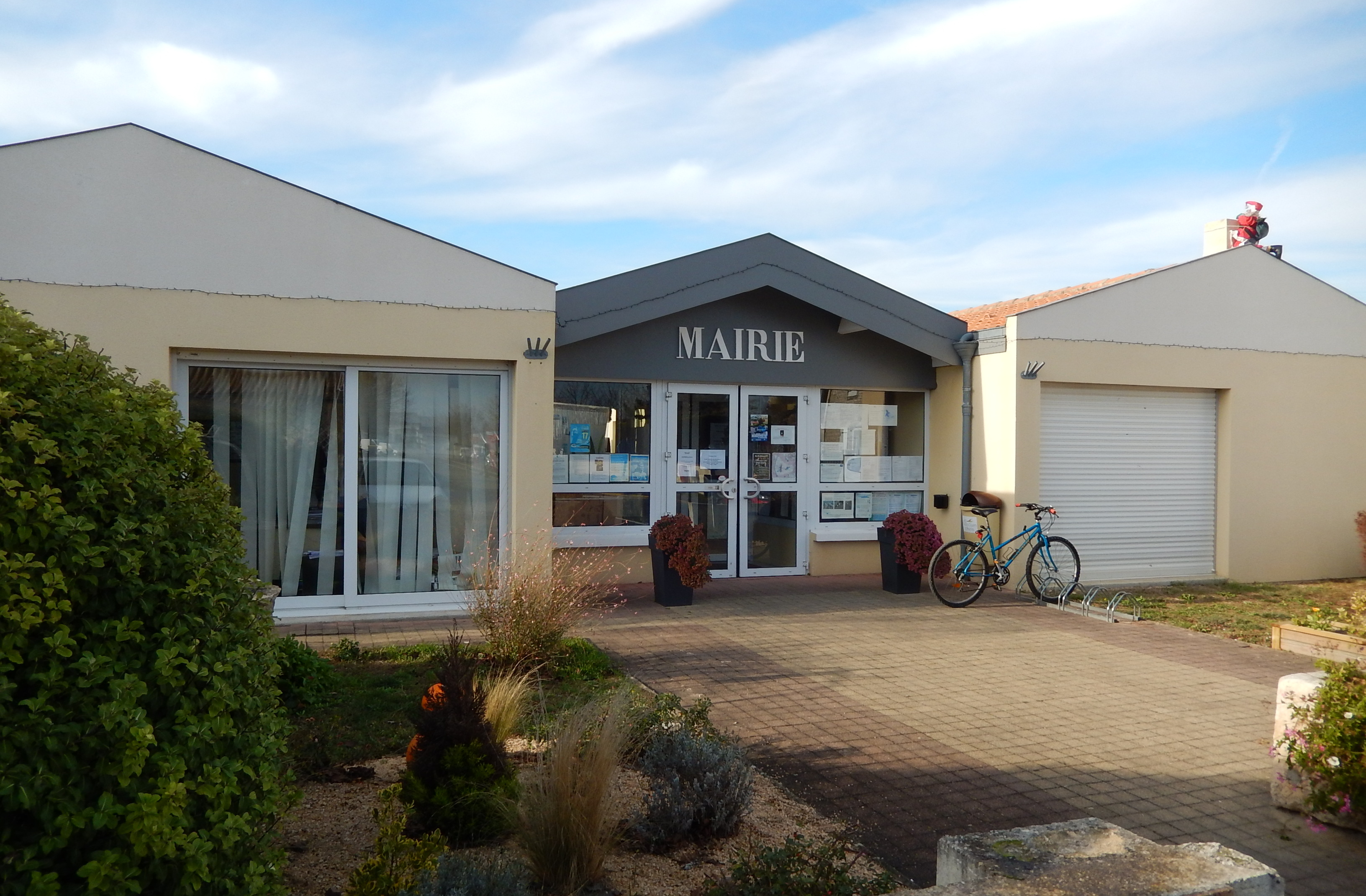
- The town hall in Saint-Ouen-d'Aunis
- Location of Saint-Ouen-d'Aunis
- Location within France Location within Nouvelle-Aquitaine
- Coordinates: 46°13′36″N 1°02′02″W
- Country: France
- Region: Nouvelle-Aquitaine
- Department: Charente-Maritime
- Arrondissement: La Rochelle
- Canton: Marans

Government
  - Mayor (2020–2026): Valérie Amy-Moie
- Area^{1}: 8.82 km^{2} (3.41 sq mi)
- Elevation: 4 m (13 ft)
- Highest elevation: 25 m (82 ft)
- Lowest elevation: 0 m (0 ft)
- Population (2023): 2,150
  - Density: 244/km^{2} (631/sq mi)
- Time zone: UTC+01:00 (CET)
  - Summer (DST): UTC+02:00 (CEST)
- INSEE/Postal code: 17376 /17230
- ^{1} French Land Register data, which excludes lakes, ponds, glaciers > 1 km^{2} (0.386 sq mi or 247 acres) and river estuaries.

Saint-Ouen-d'Aunis (French pronunciation: [sɛ̃.t‿wɛ̃ doni(s)], literally Saint-Ouen of Aunis) is a commune in the Charente-Maritime department in the Nouvelle-Aquitaine region in southwestern France.

== Population ==
Historical population
Year	Pop.	±% p.a.
1968	246	—
1975	339	+4.69%
1982	524	+6.42%
1990	612	+1.96%
1999	692	+1.37%
2007	1,200	+7.12%
2012	1,301	+1.63%
2017	1,730	+5.87%
2023	2,150	+3.69%
Source: INSEE

== See also ==
- Communes of the Charente-Maritime department
