= Courçon =

- Commune
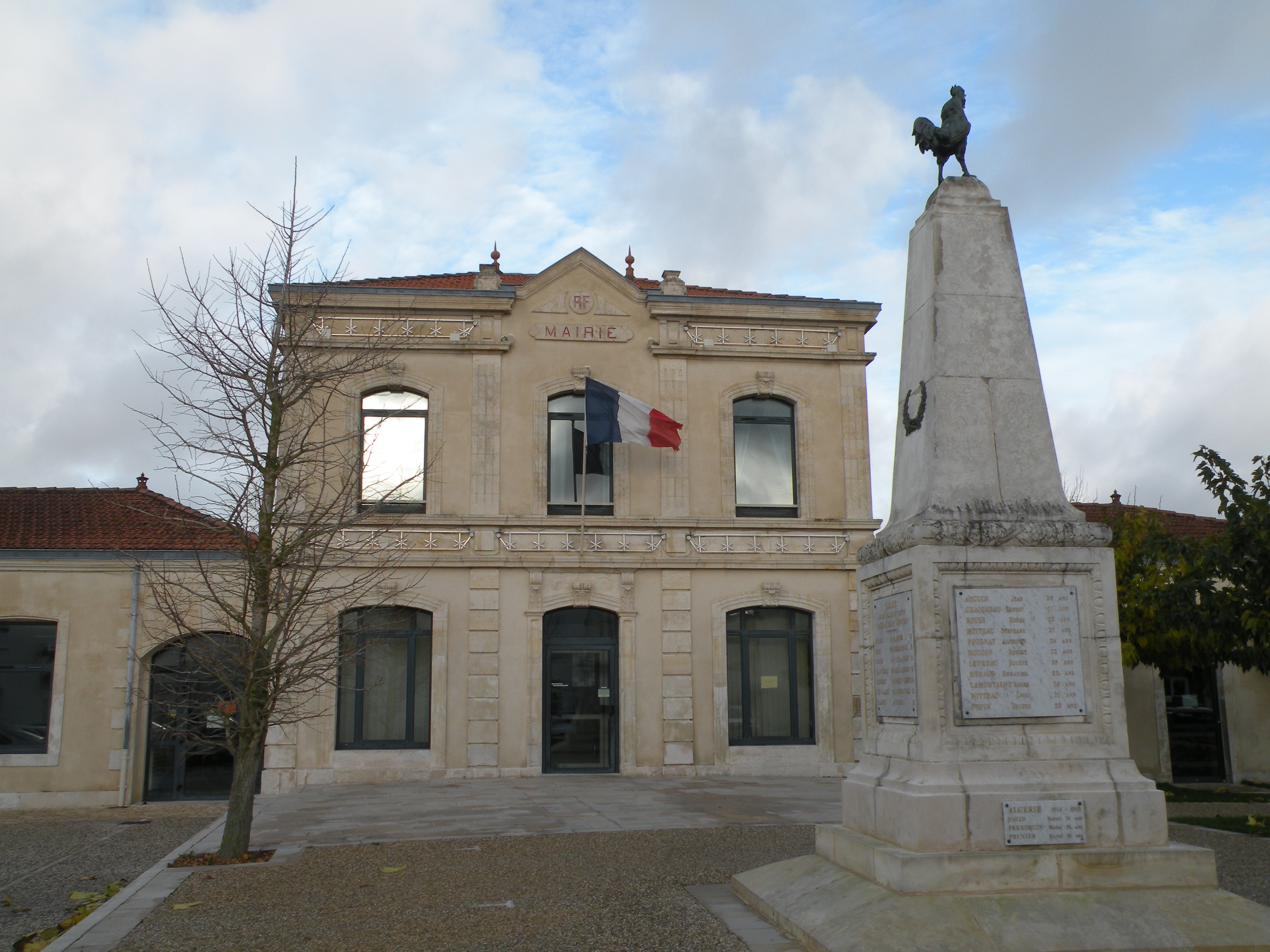
- Town hall
- Location of Courçon
- Location within France Location within Nouvelle-Aquitaine
- Coordinates: 46°14′41″N 0°48′38″W
- Country: France
- Region: Nouvelle-Aquitaine
- Department: Charente-Maritime
- Arrondissement: La Rochelle
- Canton: Marans

Government
  - Mayor (2020–2026): Nadia Boireau
- Area^{1}: 19.11 km^{2} (7.38 sq mi)
- Elevation: 25 m (82 ft)
- Highest elevation: 43 m (141 ft)
- Lowest elevation: 1 m (3.3 ft)
- Population (2023): 2,091
  - Density: 109.4/km^{2} (283.4/sq mi)
- Time zone: UTC+01:00 (CET)
  - Summer (DST): UTC+02:00 (CEST)
- INSEE/Postal code: 17127 /17170
- ^{1} French Land Register data, which excludes lakes, ponds, glaciers > 1 km^{2} (0.386 sq mi or 247 acres) and river estuaries.

Courçon (French pronunciation: [kuʁsɔ̃]) is a commune in the Charente-Maritime department in southwestern France.

== Population ==
Historical population
Year	Pop.	±% p.a.
1968	946	—
1975	956	+0.15%
1982	991	+0.51%
1990	990	−0.01%
1999	1,097	+1.15%
2007	1,499	+3.98%
2012	1,719	+2.78%
2017	1,740	+0.24%
2023	2,091	+3.11%
Source: INSEE

== See also ==
- Communes of the Charente-Maritime department
