= Canton of Marans =

Coordinates: 46°17′N 1°02′W

Marans
- Canton
- Interactive map of Marans
- Country: France
- Region: Nouvelle-Aquitaine
- Department: Charente-Maritime
- No. of communes: {{{nbcomm}}}
- Area: 440.48 km^{2} (170.07 sq mi)
- Population (2023): 32,847
  - Density: 74.571/km^{2} (193.14/sq mi)
- INSEE code: 1709

The Canton of Marans is a canton of the Charente-Maritime département, in France. At the French canton reorganisation which came into effect in March 2015, the canton was expanded from 6 to 20 communes:

- Andilly
- Angliers
- Benon
- Charron
- Courçon
- Cramchaban
- Ferrières
- La Grève-sur-Mignon
- Le Gué-d'Alleré
- La Laigne
- Longèves
- Marans
- Nuaillé-d'Aunis
- La Ronde
- Saint-Cyr-du-Doret
- Saint-Jean-de-Liversay
- Saint-Ouen-d'Aunis
- Saint-Sauveur-d'Aunis
- Taugon
- Villedoux

== Population history ==
Historical population
| Year | Pop. | ±% p.a. |
|---|---|---|
| 2013 | 28,363 | — |
| 2018 | 30,188 | +1.25% |
Source: INSEE

== See also ==
- Arrondissements of the Charente-Maritime department
- Cantons of the Charente-Maritime department
- Communes of the Charente-Maritime department
