= Longèves, Charente-Maritime =

Longèves
- Commune
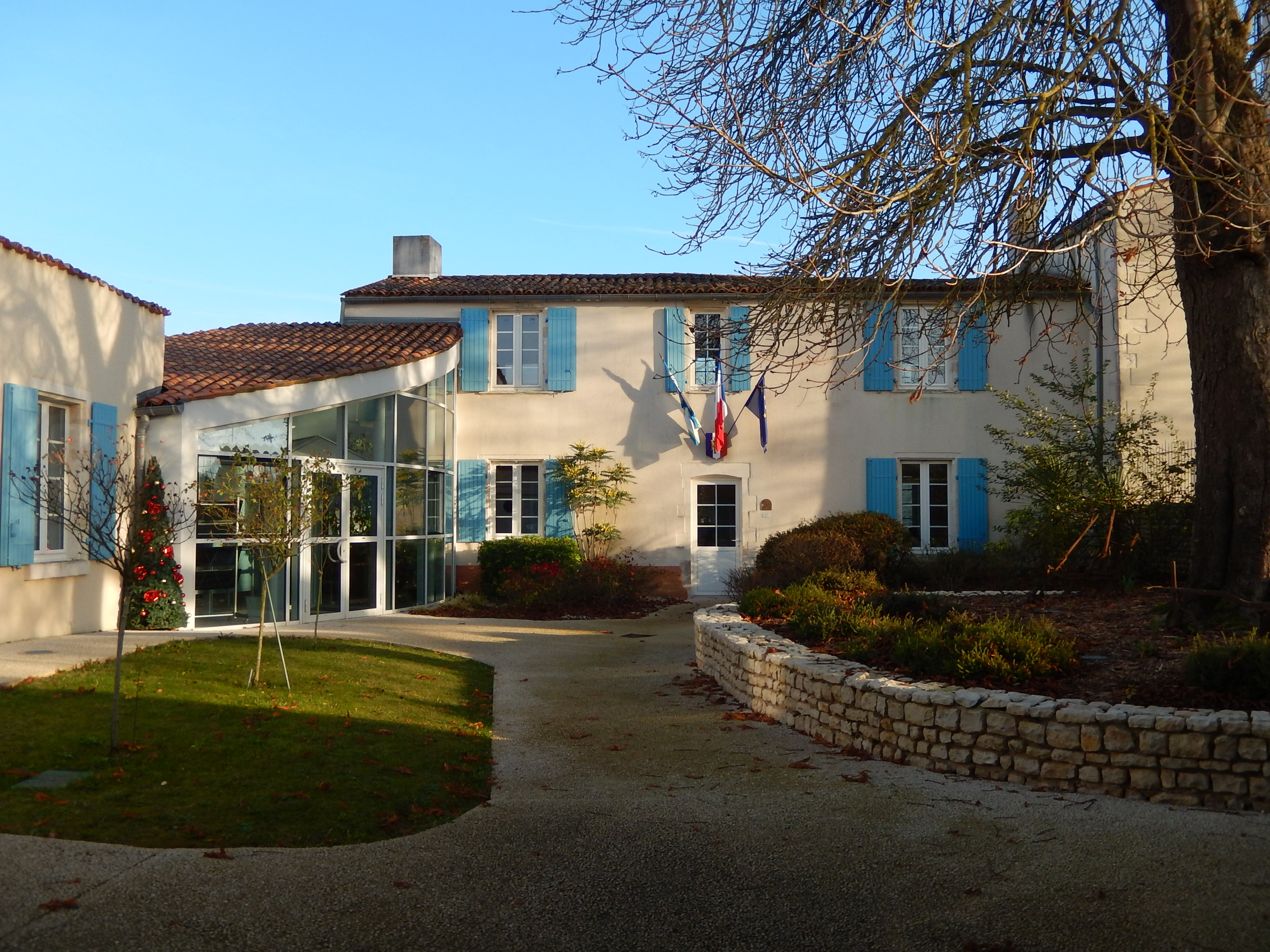
- The town hall in Longèves
- Location of Longèves
- Location within France Location within Nouvelle-Aquitaine
- Coordinates: 46°13′48″N 0°59′17″W
- Country: France
- Region: Nouvelle-Aquitaine
- Department: Charente-Maritime
- Arrondissement: La Rochelle
- Canton: Marans

Government
  - Mayor (2020–2026): Dominique Lecorgne
- Area^{1}: 12.63 km^{2} (4.88 sq mi)
- Elevation: 7 m (23 ft)
- Highest elevation: 19 m (62 ft)
- Lowest elevation: 0 m (0 ft)
- Population (2023): 1,052
  - Density: 83.29/km^{2} (215.7/sq mi)
- Time zone: UTC+01:00 (CET)
  - Summer (DST): UTC+02:00 (CEST)
- INSEE/Postal code: 17208 /17230
- ^{1} French Land Register data, which excludes lakes, ponds, glaciers > 1 km^{2} (0.386 sq mi or 247 acres) and river estuaries.

Longèves (French pronunciation: [lɔ̃ʒɛv]) is a commune in the Charente-Maritime department in southwestern France.

== Population ==
Historical population
Year	Pop.	±% p.a.
1968	321	—
1975	371	+2.09%
1982	416	+1.65%
1990	417	+0.03%
1999	515	+2.37%
2007	720	+4.28%
2012	868	+3.81%
2017	975	+2.35%
2023	1,052	+1.27%
Source: INSEE

== See also ==
- Communes of the Charente-Maritime department
