= Benon =

- Commune
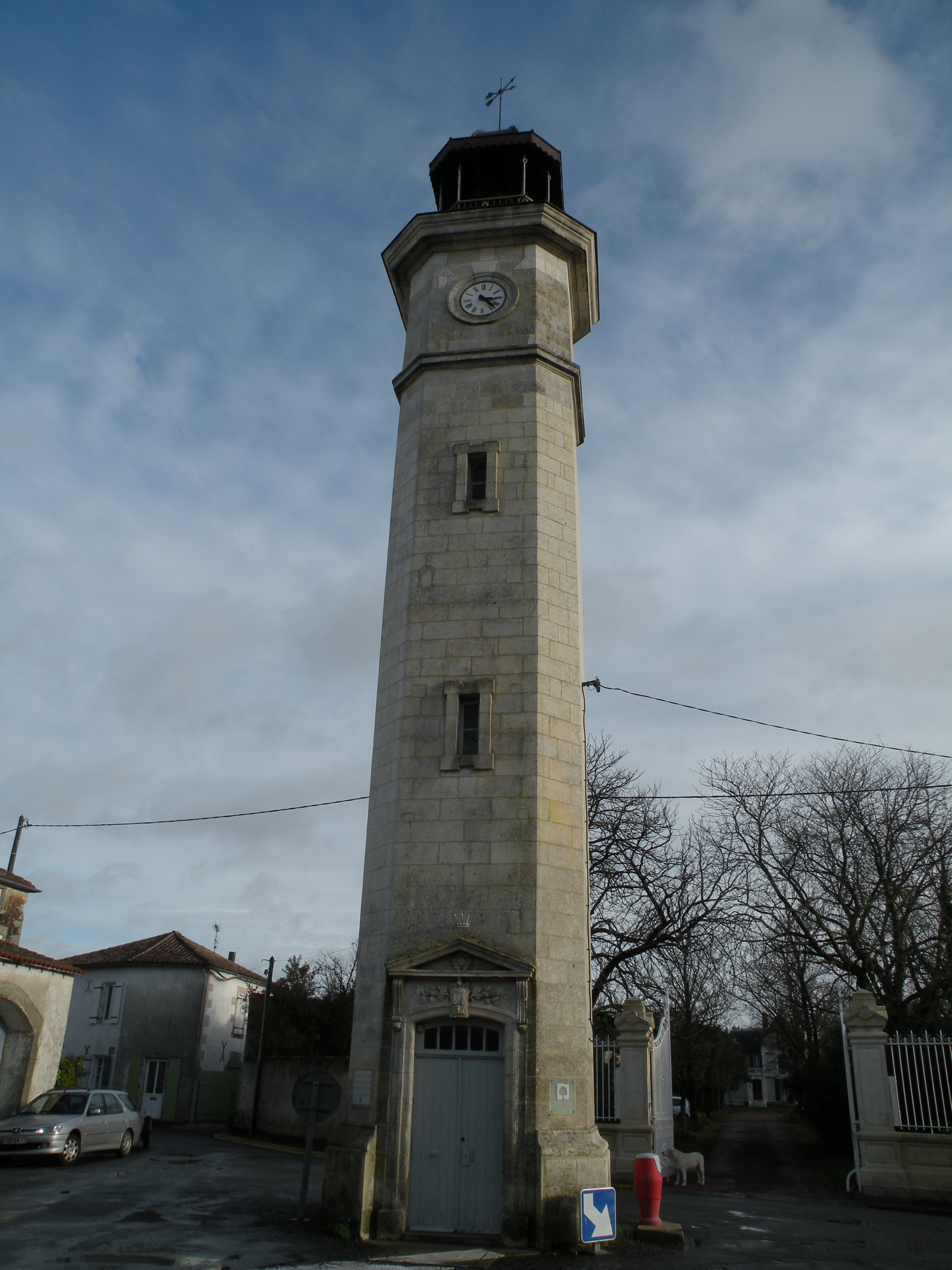
- Clock tower
- Location of Benon
- Location within France Location within Nouvelle-Aquitaine
- Coordinates: 46°12′20″N 0°48′51″W
- Country: France
- Region: Nouvelle-Aquitaine
- Department: Charente-Maritime
- Arrondissement: La Rochelle
- Canton: Marans

Government
  - Mayor (2022–2026): Christophe Vinatier
- Area^{1}: 46.62 km^{2} (18.00 sq mi)
- Elevation: 22 m (72 ft)
- Highest elevation: 56 m (184 ft)
- Lowest elevation: 7 m (23 ft)
- Population (2023): 1,859
  - Density: 39.88/km^{2} (103.3/sq mi)
- Time zone: UTC+01:00 (CET)
  - Summer (DST): UTC+02:00 (CEST)
- INSEE/Postal code: 17041 /17170
- ^{1} French Land Register data, which excludes lakes, ponds, glaciers > 1 km^{2} (0.386 sq mi or 247 acres) and river estuaries.

Benon (French pronunciation: [bənɔ̃]) is a commune in the Charente-Maritime department in the Nouvelle-Aquitaine region in southwestern France.

== Population ==
Historical population
Year	Pop.	±% p.a.
1968	504	—
1975	416	−2.70%
1982	400	−0.56%
1990	426	+0.79%
1999	514	+2.11%
2007	684	+3.64%
2012	1,377	+15.02%
2017	1,625	+3.37%
2023	1,859	+2.27%
Source: INSEE

Its population saw a rapid increase after 2007.

== See also ==
- Communes of the Charente-Maritime department
