= Cantons of La Rochelle =

French Administrative Division

Coordinates: 46.16°N 1.15°W

The cantons of La Rochelle are administrative divisions of the Charente-Maritime department, in western France. Since the French canton reorganisation which came into effect in March 2015, the town of La Rochelle is subdivided into 3 cantons. Their seat is in La Rochelle.

== Population ==
Name	Population (2019)	Cantonal Code
Canton of La Rochelle-1	26,574	1714
Canton of La Rochelle-2	25,444	1715
Canton of La Rochelle-3	25,187	1716
