= European route E3 =

Road in trans-European E-road network

E3

Route information
- Length: 459 km (285 mi)

Major junctions
- North end: Cherbourg
- South end: La Rochelle

Location
- Countries: France

Highway system
- International E-road network; A Class; B Class
← E1	→ E4

European route E3 is a series of roads in France, part of the United Nations International E-road network. It runs from Cherbourg to La Rochelle.

== Route ==
The road is 459 km (285 mi) long, and travels along the French routes nationales. From Cherbourg to Carentan, it travels along the Route nationale 13. At Carentan, it changes to the Route nationale 174. It then moves onto the autoroute, mainly the A84 (which it joins at Junction 40) until it reaches Saint-Lô at Junction 16. It then rejoins the RN, mainly Route nationale 136 at Rennes before finally travelling along the Route nationale 137 to its final destination of La Rochelle. It also comes close to the outskirts of Nantes.

== Historical trajectory ==
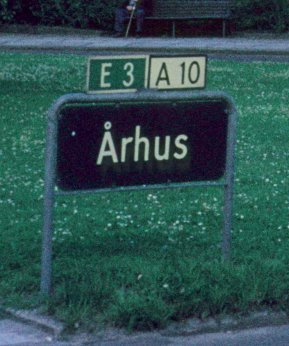
The E3 in Århus, Denmark, before 1975: Changed to E45.

The original trajectory of the E3 ran from Lisbon, Portugal to Stockholm, Sweden, and later to Helsinki, Finland. It was a series of existing secondary roads and highways, officially bundled under the name E3 by European decree on 16 September 1950. In 1975 the numbering system of European roads changed drastically. The name E3 was applied to the part from Cherbourg-La Rochelle to Carentan, which was part of the original E3. The name of the historical trajectory lives on in E3 Harelbeke, a cycling race in Belgium.

== Detailed route ==
Department	National road number	Section	Junction	Northbound destinations	Southbound destinations
(European Union) (France) Normandy Manche	National Route 13	Cherbourg-Octeville – Les Veys	Rue Aristide Cherbourg-Octeville-Centre D116 Cherbourg-Octeville-Centre, Bretteville D901 Saint-Pierre-Église, Digosville, Barfleur N13, D901 Rennes, Caen, Saint-Lô, Cherbourg-Octeville, Tourlaville N13, N2013, D352 Rennes, Caen, Saint-Lô, Cherbourg-Octeville, Valognes, Martinvast, Tollevast D56 Brix, Saint-Martin-le-Gréard, Couville D119 Brix, Saussemesnil D262 Sottevast D146 Saint-Joseph, Rocheville D974 Valognes D62 Valognes, Sottevast D2 Valognes, Coutances, Lieusaint D520 Montebourg, Saint-Cyr, Quinéville D69 Joganville, Écausseville, Émondeville D214 Fresville D974 Sainte-Mère-Église, Neuville-au-Plain, Ravenoville D67 Sainte-Mère-Église, Utah Beach D70 Blosville, Picauville, Sainte-Marie-du-Mont D913 Sainte-Marie-du-Mont, Vierville, Utah Beach D971 Carentan-Nord, Coutances, Périers D974 Carentan-Sud, Saint-Hilaire-Petitville, Catz N174 Bayeux, Caen, Le Havre, Isigny-sur-Mer, Rennes, Saint-Lô, Saint-Jean-de-Daye	Cherbourg-Octeville	Saint-Lô Caen Rennes
(European Union) (France) Normandy Manche	National Route 174	Les Veys – Guilberville	9 D9 Saint-Jean-de-Daye, Saint-Fromond, Le Dézert 8 D377 Pont-Hébert, Cavigny, La Meauffe 7 D900 Périers, Hébécrevon, Amigny 6 D900, D972 Saint-Lô-Ouest, Coutances, Agneaux 5 D999 Saint-Lô-Centre, Bourgvallées, Percy 4 D972 Saint-Lô-Centre, Bayeux 3 D974 Saint-Lô-Est, Bayeux (only northbound) 2 D551 Condé-sur-Vire, Saint-Jean-d'Elle, Sainte-Suzanne-sur-Vire (only southbound) 1 D53 Torigni-sur-Vire, Condé-sur-Vire, Saint-Amand	Cherbourg-Octeville	Saint-Lô Rennes
(European Union) (France) Normandy Manche	A84 motorway Autoroute des Estuaires	Guilberville – Pont-Farcy	40 N174, D974 Cherbourg-Octeville, Saint-Lô, Vire, Flers	Cherbourg-Octeville Saint-Lô Caen	Rennes Mont-Saint-Michel
Calvados	A84 motorway Autoroute des Estuaires	Pont-Farcy	39 D21 Tessy-sur-Vire, Pont-Farcy, Fourneaux	Caen	Rennes Mont-Saint-Michel
Manche	A84 motorway Autoroute des Estuaires	Pont-Farcy – Avranches	Aire de la Vallée de la Vire Gouvets 38 D999 Saint-Lô, Villedieu-les-Poêles, Percy 37 D924 Granville, Villedieu-les-Poêles, Coutances, Vire Aire de la Baie 36 D975, D911 Le Parc, Chavoy, Tirepied	Caen	Rennes Mont-Saint-Michel
Manche	National Route 175	Avranches – Poilley	D7 Avranches, Ponts, La Haye-Pesnel D973 Avranches, Granville, Sartilly D456 Avranches, Le Val-Saint-Père D43E2 Pontaubault, Le Val-Saint-Père	Caen	Rennes Mont-Saint-Michel
Manche	A84 motorway Autoroute des Estuaires	Poilley – Carnet	34 N175 Brest, Saint-Malo, Saint-Brieuc, Mont Saint-Michel 33 D976 Saint-Hilaire-du-Harcouët, Ducey Aire de Mont Saint-Michel 32 D30, D230 Saint-James, Pontorson, Saint-Georges-de-Reintembault	Caen Mont-Saint-Michel	Rennes Fougères
(European Union) (France) Brittany Ille-et-Vilaine	A84 motorway Autoroute des Estuaires	Carnet – Rennes	31 D15 Coglès, Antrain, Montours 30 D155, Fougères-Nord, Saint-Étienne-en-Coglès 29 N12 Fougères-Sud, Romagné, Saint-Sauveur-des-Landes Aire de la Lande 28 D794 Vitré, Saint-Aubin-du-Cormier, Combourg 27 D92 Liffré, Ercé-près-Liffré, Gahard 26 D528 Liffré, Saint-Sulpice-la-Forêt 25 D812 Thorigné-Fouillard N136 Rennes-Centre, Rennes-Ouest, Le Mans, Angers, Nantes, Brest, Lorient, Saint-Malo	Caen Mont-Saint-Michel	Rennes
(European Union) (France) Brittany Ille-et-Vilaine	National Route 136 Ring road around Rennes	Rennes	17 D86 Rennes-Centre, Cesson-Sévigné, Acigné N157 Laval, Le Mans, Paris 1 Centre commercial 2 Cesson-Sévigné 3a Rennes-Centre, Cesson-Sévigné-Sud 3b Zone Industrielle Sud Est 4 Rennes-Centre, Chantepie, Châteaugiron 5a Rennes-Centre 5b D173 Angers, Vern-sur-Seiche, Châteaubriant, Janzé 6b Rennes-Centre 6a Nantes, Chartres-de-Bretagne, Noyal-Châtillon-sur-Seiche, Bain-de-Bretagne	Caen	Nantes
(European Union) (France) Brittany Ille-et-Vilaine	National Route 137	Rennes – Grand-Fougeray	N136 Le Mans, Angers, Caen Aire du Hil D34 Chartres-de-Bretagne, Noyal-Châtillon-sur-Seiche, Vern-sur-Seiche D36 Bruz, Pont-Péan, Saint-Erblon Pont-Péan, Orgères D41 Laillé, Chanteloup, Corps-Nuds D101, D48 Crevin, Bourg-des-Comptes, Janzé Aire de la Berlaudais D47 Poligné, Pléchâtel, Bourg-des-Comptes D777 Bain-de-Bretagne, Messac, Pancé D737 Bain-de-Bretagne Aire de Pommeniac D52 La Dominelais, La Noë-Blanche D57 La Dominelais, Grand-Fougeray	Rennes	Nantes
(European Union) (France) Pays de la Loire Loire-Atlantique	National Route 137	Grand-Fougeray – Nantes	D56 Grand-Fougeray D46, D537 Châteaubriant, Pierric, Guémené-Penfao, Derval-Nord D537 Châteaubriant, Guémené-Penfao, Derval-Sud D39 Jans, Marsac-sur-Don D771 Châteaubriant, Nozay, Vay, Issé, Treffieux D2 Nozay, Vay N171 Saint-Nazaire, Blain, La Grigonnais Aire de Puceul D35 Puceul, La Grigonnais, Abbaretz D33 Saffré, La Chevallerais D164 Nort-sur-Erdre, Blain D16 Héric, Nort-sur-Erdre, Casson D237 Héric, Blain D537 Treillières, Grandchamps-des-Fontaines, Casson Aire de Treillières D75 Orvault, La Chapelle-sur-Erdre A844 Nantes, Angers, Paris, Cholet, Poitiers, Bordeaux, Saint-Nazaire, La Roche-sur-Yon	Rennes	Nantes
(European Union) (France) Pays de la Loire Loire-Atlantique	National Route 844 Ring road around Nantes	Nantes	N165 Saint-Nazaire, Vannes, Lorient, Brest, Quimper, Sautron 36 D75 Orvault, Saint-Herblain (only northbound) 35 D965 Nantes-Centre, Orvault, Sautron 34 Avenue Louis Guilloux Nantes-Centre, Saint-Herblain-Nord 33 N444 Nantes-Centre, Saint-Nazaire, Vannes, Brest, Lorient, Quimper, Sautron 32 Boulevard Salvador Allende Nantes-Ouest, Saint-Herblain-Centre (only northbound) 31 D17, Boulevard Charles de Gaulle Nantes-Centre, Saint-Herblain-Centre 30 D417 Nantes-Ouest, Saint-Herblain, Indre 52a D723 Saint-Nazaire, Noirmoutier-en-l'Île, Bouguenais 52b D723 Nantes-Centre, Rezé 51 D85 Rezé, Nantes Atlantique Airport, Saint-Aignan-Grandlieu 50 D823 Nantes-Sud, Rezé, Nantes Atlantique Airport 49 D137 Nantes-Centre, Rezé, Les Sorinières 48a A83 Bordeaux, La Roche-sur-Yon, La Rochelle, Niort, Poitiers	Rennes	Bordeaux La Rochelle Niort La Roche-sur-Yon
(European Union) (France) Pays de la Loire Loire-Atlantique	A83 motorway Autoroute des Estuaires	Nantes – Boufféré	Aire de la Grassinière 1 D178 La Roche-sur-Yon, Challans, Saint-Philbert-de-Grand-Lieu, Noirmoutier-en-l'Île (only southbound) 2 D137 Niort, Le Bignon, Les Sorinières, La Roche-sur-Yon, Challans, Saint-Philbert-de-Grand-Lieu, Noirmoutier-en-l'Île Péage du Bignon 3 D117 Clisson, Aigrefeuille-sur-Maine, Montbert Aire de Remouillé	Nantes	Bordeaux La Rochelle Niort La Roche-sur-Yon
Vendée	A83 motorway Autoroute des Estuaires	Boufféré – Saint-Jean-de-Beugné	4 D763 La Roche-sur-Yon, Challans, Cholet, Montaigu, Boufféré Aire des Brouzils A87 Cholet, Angers, La Roche-sur-Yon, Les Sables-d'Olonne, Le Mans, Paris 5 D160 La Roche-sur-Yon, Cholet, Essarts-en-Bocage, Les Herbiers, Sainte-Florence Aire de Grissay 6 D948 La Roche-sur-Yon, Bournezeau, Chantonnay, Pouzauges Aire de la Vendée 7 D137 La Rochelle, Sainte-Hermine, Saint-Jean-de-Beugné, Luçon, Chantonnay	Nantes	Bordeaux La Rochelle Niort La Roche-sur-Yon
Vendée	Departement Route 137	Saint-Jean-de-Beugné – Luçon	Saint-Jean-de-Beugné D88 Saint-Aubin-la-Plaine, Nalliers D88 Bessay Sainte-Gemme-la-Plaine D14 Saint-Aubin-la-Plaine, Sainte-Gemme-la-Plaine-Centre D949 Luçon, La Roche-sur-Yon, Les Sables-d'Olonne, Nalliers, Fontenay-le-Comte	Nantes La Roche-sur-Yon	La Rochelle Luçon
Vendée	Departement Route 137	Luçon – Chaillé-les-Marais	D10A Puyravault Moreilles D10 Sainte-Radégonde-des-Noyers, Nalliers, Mouzeuil-Saint-Martin Chaillé-les-Marais D30 Chaillé-les-Marais-Centre, Vouillé-les-Marais, La Taillée, Le Gué-de-Velluire, Le Langon D25 Sainte-Radégonde-des-Noyers, Puyravault, Champagné-les-Marais D25A Vouillé-les-Marais	Nantes La Roche-sur-Yon Luçon	La Rochelle Marans
(European Union) (France) Nouvelle-Aquitaine Charente-Maritime	Departement Route 137	Chaillé-les-Marais – Marans	D938TER L'Île-d'Elle, Fontenay-le-Comte Marans	Nantes La Roche-sur-Yon Luçon	La Rochelle Marans
(European Union) (France) Nouvelle-Aquitaine Charente-Maritime	Departement Route 137	Marans – Sainte-Soulle	D114 Marans-Centre, Charron, Saint-Jean-de-Liversay, Courçon, Mauzé-sur-le-Mignon D20 Andilly, Villedoux D112 Andilly, Longèves, Nuaillé-d'Aunis N11, D110 Sainte-Soulle, La Rochelle, Niort, Bordeaux	Nantes La Roche-sur-Yon Marans	La Rochelle
(European Union) (France) Nouvelle-Aquitaine Charente-Maritime	National Route 11	Sainte-Soulle – La Rochelle	D202 Saint-Ouen-d'Aunis (only southbound) D107 Dompierre-sur-Mer (only entrances) D9 Luçon, Saint-Xandre, Villedoux Puilboreau Aire de Puilboreau D263 Puilboreau, Périgny N237, N137 La Rochelle-Centre, Île de Ré, Bordeaux, Rochefort, La Rochelle – Île de Ré Airport	Niort La Roche-sur-Yon Nantes	La Rochelle Rochefort Bordeaux
