= A83 autoroute =

Road in France

A83 autoroute

Route information
- Part of E3
- Maintained by DIR Ouest and ASF
- Length: 152.5 km (94.8 mi)
- Existed: 2001–present

Major junctions
- North end: E3 / N 844 in Vertou near Nantes

- A 87 in Les Essarts

- South end: E5 / A 10 in La Crèche

Location
- Country: France

Highway system
- Roads in France; Autoroutes; Routes nationales

The A83 autoroute is a motorway in France. It is in the departments of Pays-de-la-Loire and Poitou-Charentes operated by ASF. It connects Nantes to Niort via Fontenay-le-Comte. The motorway has a junction with the A10 at Niort which gives access to the north and to Bordeaux connection. The A83 forms part of the Autoroute des Estuaires. The total length is 152.5 km. It is also part of the European route E3.

== Opposition ==
The A83 was only finally opened in 2001 with the opening of the section between Oulmes and Niort. This last part of the route put an end to a long debate since 1987. The A83 was originally to join the A10 by circumventing Niort to the south passing close to Coulon and Magné. This route was more direct but crossed the Poitevin Marsh (Marais Poitevin) – disturbing fauna, flora, and the landscapes of this wet marshland.

A83 was opened between Nantes and Oulmes while a more environmentally friendly route was sought. The southern layout close to Niort had two problems wet marsh and the urbanized district of Saint-Liguaire. Finally, in 1992, a longer route to the north of Niort was selected. This was supported by the Local authority as it served more of its district. The last 34.4 km between Oulmes and Niort were opened by Ségolène Royal in 2001, then deputy of Deux-Sèvres. She had had to campaign to ensure the marshland is preserved. Arbitration had been provided by President François Mitterrand.

== List of exits and junctions ==
Region	Department	Junctions	Destinations	Notes
Pays de la Loire	Loire-Atlantique	Périphérique de Nantes (RN 844) - A83	Périphérique Intérieur : Noirmoutier, Brest, Vannes (A82), Rennes, Rezé, Les Sorinières, Nantes-Atlantique	
Pays de la Loire	Loire-Atlantique	Périphérique de Nantes (RN 844) - A83	Périphérique Extérieur : Poitiers, Paris (A11), Vertou	
Pays de la Loire	Loire-Atlantique	Aire de la Grassinière		
Pays de la Loire	Loire-Atlantique	1 : La Roulière	Les Sorinières, Saint-Philbert-de-Grand-Lieu, La Roche-sur-Yon	Entry and exit from Nantes
Pays de la Loire	Loire-Atlantique	2 : La Cour Neuve	Les Sorinières, Aigrefeuille-sur-Maine, La Rochelle, Niort	
Pays de la Loire	Loire-Atlantique	Péage du Bignon		
Pays de la Loire	Loire-Atlantique	3 : Aigrefeuille	Aigrefeuille-sur-Maine, Montbert, Saint-Philbert-de-Grand-Lieu, Clisson	
Pays de la Loire	Loire-Atlantique	Aire de Remouillé		
Pays de la Loire	Loire-Atlantique	4 : Montaigu	Montaigu, Boufféré, La Roche-sur-Yon, Les Sables-d'Olonne	
Pays de la Loire	Vendée	Aire des Brouzils (Southbound); Aire de Chavagnes-en-Paillers (Northbound)		
Pays de la Loire	Vendée	A87 - A83	La Roche-sur-Yon, Les Sables-d'Olonne, Angers, Cholet, Les Herbiers	
Pays de la Loire	Vendée	5 : Les Essarts	Les Essarts	
Pays de la Loire	Vendée	Aire de Sainte-Florence		
Pays de la Loire	Vendée	6 : Chantonnay	Bournezeau, Chantonnay, Pouzauges, La Roche-sur-Yon, Les Sables-d'Olonne	
Pays de la Loire	Vendée	Aire de la Vendée		
Pays de la Loire	Vendée	7 : Sainte-Hermine	Luçon, Sainte-Hermine, La Rochelle	
Pays de la Loire	Vendée	E3 / A 83 becomes A 83		
Pays de la Loire	Vendée	7.1 : Fontenay-le-Comte - ouest	Fontenay-le-Comte, la Châtaigneraie, Luçon, Pouzauges	
Pays de la Loire	Vendée	Aire d'Auzay		
Pays de la Loire	Vendée	8 : Fontenay-le-Comte - centre	Marans, Fontenay-le-Comte	
Pays de la Loire	Vendée	9 : Niort - ouest	Niort - centre, Marais Poitevin	
Nouvelle-Aquitaine	Deux-Sèvres	Aire de la Chateaudrie (Southbound); Aire de la Canepetière (Northbound)		
Nouvelle-Aquitaine	Deux-Sèvres	10 : Niort - nord	Niort - nord, Parthenay, Bressuire, Angers, Saumur	
Nouvelle-Aquitaine	Deux-Sèvres	11 : Niort - est	Niort, Saint-Maixent-l'École, La Crèche, Chauray	
Nouvelle-Aquitaine	Deux-Sèvres	A10 - A83	Paris, Poitiers, Bordeaux, Saintes, Limoges, Angoulême	
1.000 mi = 1.609 km; 1.000 km = 0.621 mi

== A831 ==
The autoroute aims to shorten the journey from Nantes to Bordeaux which currently uses the A83/A10, this adds 25 km to the journey (Sainte-Hermine à Saintes RN137 & A837 autoroute).

The A831, will connect Rochefort (A837) with Fontenay-le-Comte (A83). The route between Nantes and Bordeaux will be via A83 between Nantes and Fontenay-le-Comte, the A831 between Fontenay-le-Comte and Rochefort, the A837 between Rochefort and Saintes and the A10 between Saintes and Bordeaux. In spite of the many different motorways involved the route will be shorter.

A831 is currently only a proposal declared by a Public Utility Decree by the State Council on July 12, 2005. The next stage is the awarding of the concession to run the motorway. The road will however have to cross the Poitevin Marsh and Rochefort Marshes, the two great wetlands of the Atlantic Coast, which probably be challenged.
