= Puyravault =

Puyravault is the name of 2 communes in France:

- Puyravault, Charente-Maritime, in the Charente-Maritime department
- Puyravault, Vendée, in the Vendée department
