= Vouillé =

Vouillé may refer to the following places in France:

- Vouillé, Deux-Sèvres, a commune in the Deux-Sèvres department
- Vouillé, Vienne, a commune in the Vienne department
- Vouillé-les-Marais, a commune in the Vendée department

== See also ==
- Battle of Vouillé
