= Carnett =

Carnett is a surname. Notable people with the surname include:

- Eddie Carnett (1916–2016), American baseball player
- John Berton Carnett (1890–1988), American surgeon
  - Carnett's sign, a medical sign

== See also ==
- Carnet (disambiguation)
