= Carnet =

A carnet may refer to:

In international law:

- A legal authorisation, usually in the context of document allowing the importation of certain goods to countries without paying customs duty. Three types exist:
  - ATA Carnet, for temporary importation of goods and equipment
  - Carnet de Passages en Douane, for motor vehicles
  - TIR Carnet, to simplify administrative formalities of transiting commercial goods carried by international road transport
- It can also mean a legal authorisation to provide services in other contexts, such as the carnet of the IFMGA. The carnet of the IFMGA allows the holder to legally provide mountain skills training and leadership on glaciated terrain.

== Other ==
- Carnet, archaic name of Bordeaux wine producer Château La Tour Carnet
- CARNET, the Croatian Academic and Research Network
- Carnet (ticket), a booklet of tickets used on public transport systems
- Carnets de Géologie, a scientific electronic journal dealing with earth sciences

== Places ==
- Carnet, County Londonderry, a townland in County Londonderry, Northern Ireland
- Carnet, Manche, a commune in France

== See also ==
- Cornet (disambiguation)
