= Percy-en-Normandie =

- Commune
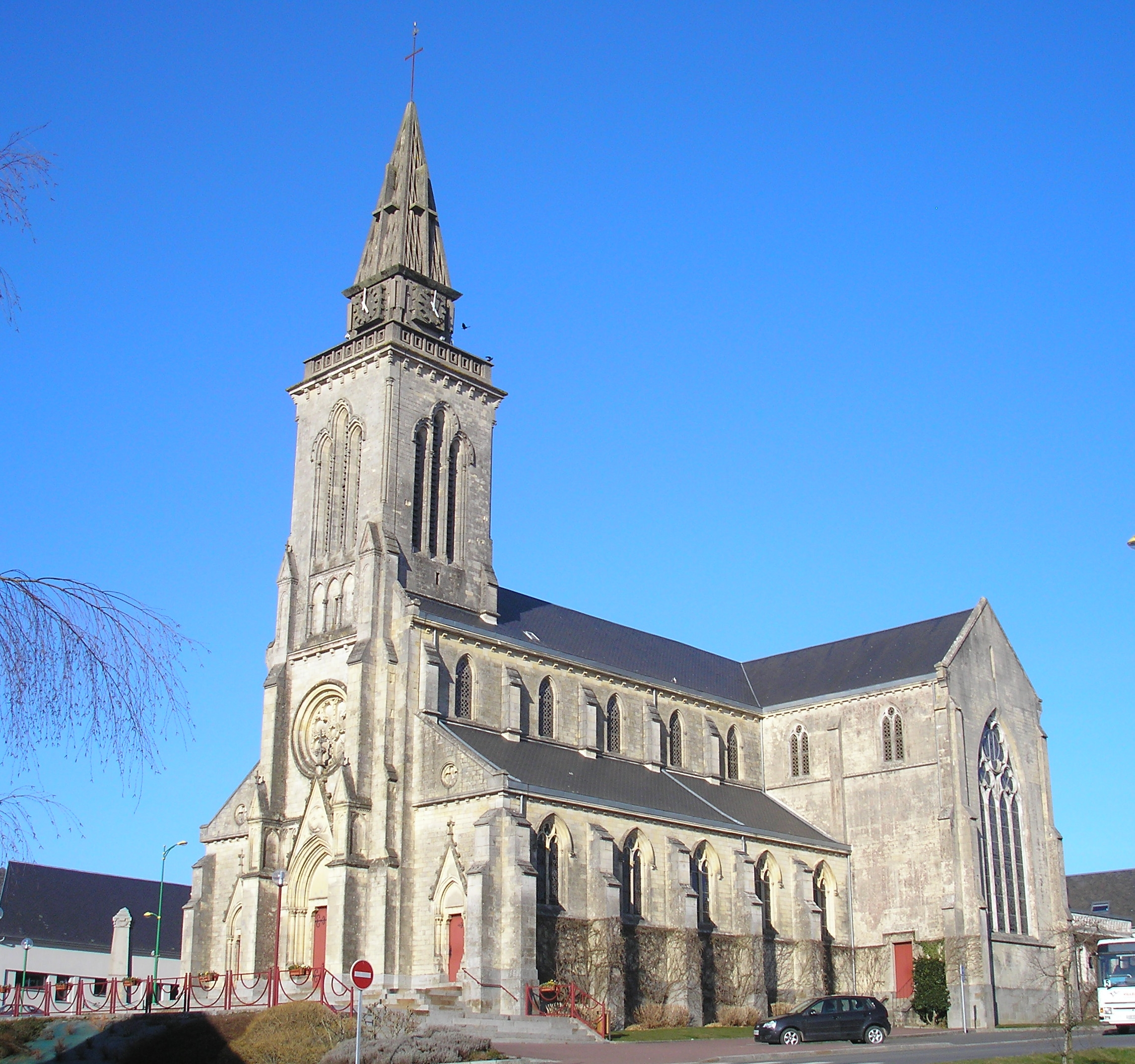
- The church in Percy
- Location of Percy-en-Normandie
- Location within France Location within Normandy
- Coordinates: 48°54′58″N 1°11′24″W
- Country: France
- Region: Normandy
- Department: Manche
- Arrondissement: Saint-Lô
- Canton: Villedieu-les-Poêles-Rouffigny
- Area^{1}: 48.32 km^{2} (18.66 sq mi)
- Population (2023): 2,641
  - Density: 54.66/km^{2} (141.6/sq mi)
- Time zone: UTC+01:00 (CET)
  - Summer (DST): UTC+02:00 (CEST)
- INSEE/Postal code: 50393 /50410
- ^{1} French Land Register data, which excludes lakes, ponds, glaciers > 1 km^{2} (0.386 sq mi or 247 acres) and river estuaries.

Percy-en-Normandie (French pronunciation: [pɛʁsi ɑ̃ nɔʁmɑ̃di], literally Percy in Normandy) is a commune in the department of Manche, northwestern France. The municipality was established on 1 January 2016 by merger of the former communes of Percy and Le Chefresne.

== Population ==
Population data refer to the area corresponding with the commune as of January 2025.

Historical population
Year	Pop.	±% p.a.
1968	2,823	—
1975	2,579	−1.28%
1982	2,555	−0.13%
1990	2,407	−0.74%
1999	2,408	+0.00%
2007	2,516	+0.55%
2012	2,600	+0.66%
2017	2,583	−0.13%
2023	2,641	+0.37%
Source: INSEE

== See also ==
- Communes of the Manche department
