= Château de Brix =

Castle in Manche, Normandy, France

- Château d'Adam
- Brix, Normandy, France

Location
- Coordinates: 49°32′45″N 1°34′40″W

The Château de Brix, also known as the Château d’Adam, was a castle in Brix, Normandy, France.

== History ==
Adam de Brix, Seigneur of Brix, began construction of a castle at Brix in the 11th century. The castle was built on a rocky spur above the village.

Richard I of England visited the castle in 1194 and John of England in 1203. After the loss of the Plantagenet's lands in Normandy by John, following their conquest by the French Crown in 1204, Philip II of France ordered the demolition of the castle at Brix.
