= Saint-Jean-d'Hermine =

- Commune
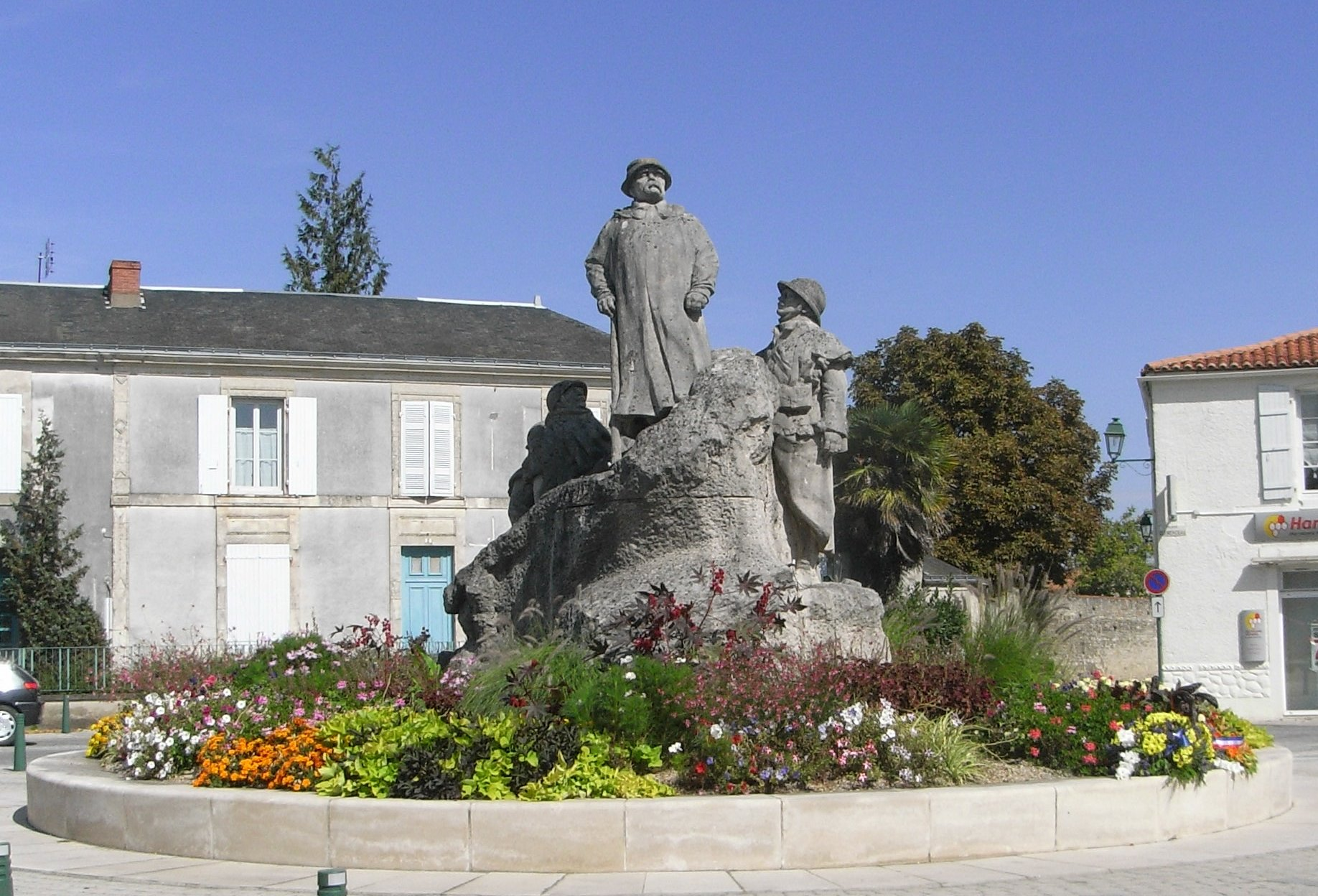
- A statue of Georges Clemenceau, in Sainte-Hermine
- Location of Saint-Jean-d'Hermine
- Location within France Location within Pays de la Loire
- Coordinates: 46°33′25″N 1°03′16″W
- Country: France
- Region: Pays de la Loire
- Department: Vendée
- Arrondissement: Fontenay-le-Comte
- Canton: La Châtaigneraie
- Intercommunality: CC Sud-Vendée-Littoral

Government
  - Mayor (2025–2026): Philippe Barré
- Area^{1}: 47.83 km^{2} (18.47 sq mi)
- Highest elevation: 83 m (272 ft)
- Lowest elevation: 9 m (30 ft)
- Population (2023): 3,611
  - Density: 75.50/km^{2} (195.5/sq mi)
- Time zone: UTC+01:00 (CET)
  - Summer (DST): UTC+02:00 (CEST)
- INSEE/Postal code: 85223 /85210
- ^{1} French Land Register data, which excludes lakes, ponds, glaciers > 1 km^{2} (0.386 sq mi or 247 acres) and river estuaries.

Saint-Jean-d'Hermine (French pronunciation: [sɛ̃ ʒɑ̃ dɛʁmin]) is a commune in the Vendée department in the Pays de la Loire region in western France. It was formed on 1 January 2025, with the merger of Sainte-Hermine and Saint-Jean-de-Beugné.

== Population ==
Population data refer to the area corresponding with the commune as of January 2025.

Historical population
| Year | Pop. | ±% p.a. |
|---|---|---|
| 1968 | 2,593 | — |
| 1975 | 2,656 | +0.34% |
| 1982 | 2,686 | +0.16% |
| 1990 | 2,673 | −0.06% |
| 1999 | 2,673 | +0.00% |
| 2007 | 3,072 | +1.75% |
| 2012 | 3,417 | +2.15% |
| 2017 | 3,519 | +0.59% |
| 2023 | 3,611 | +0.43% |
Source: INSEE

== See also ==
- Communes of the Vendée department
