= Théodore Tiffereau =

French photographer and alchemist

Théodore Cyprien Tiffereau, born in Sainte-Radégonde-des-Noyers, on June 23, 1819, and died in Arvert (Charente-Maritime) on March 9, 1909, was a French photographer and alchemist.

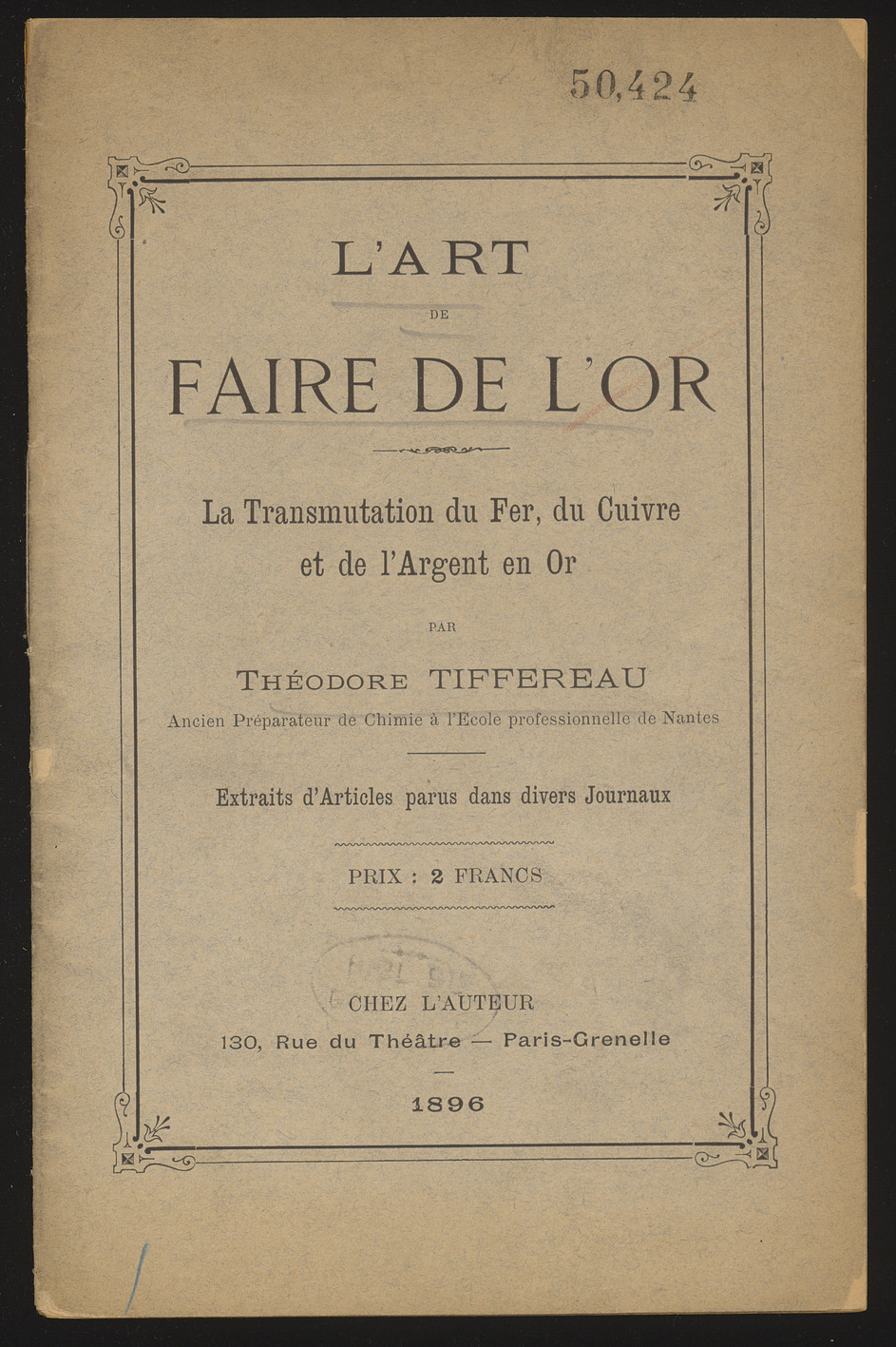
First page of L'Art Faire De L'Or by Théodore Tiffereau

He studied chemistry and physics at the Professional School 2 of Nantes, he is also a chemistry trainer there.

Tiffereau traveled to Mexico from 1842 to 1847, from where he brought back daguerreotypes of landscapes and native Mexicans.

Between 1854 and 1855, he presented six memoirs to the French Academy of Sciences concerning the transmutation of silver into gold. In particular, he claimed that silver from Mexico possessed specific chemical properties allowing this transmutation.

His claims were described in the contemporary chemical theories, and were deemed important enough and plausible enough that the Academy of Sciences made a committee to investigate his claims.
