= Canton of Aytré =

Coordinates: 46°06′N 1°06′W

Aytré
- Canton
- Interactive map of Aytré
- Country: France
- Region: Nouvelle-Aquitaine
- Department: Charente-Maritime
- No. of communes: {{{nbcomm}}}
- Area: 49.23 km^{2} (19.01 sq mi)
- Population (2023): 31,703
  - Density: 644.0/km^{2} (1,668/sq mi)
- INSEE code: 1701

The Canton of Aytré is a canton of the Charente-Maritime département, in France. After the French canton reorganisation which came into effect in March 2015, the canton was expanded from 3 to 4 communes:

- Aytré
- Dompierre-sur-Mer
- Périgny
- Puilboreau

== Population history ==
Historical population
Year	Pop.	±% p.a.
2013	27,782	—
2018	29,709	+1.35%
Source: INSEE

== See also ==
- Cantons of the Charente-Maritime department
