= Tirepied-sur-Sée =

- Commune
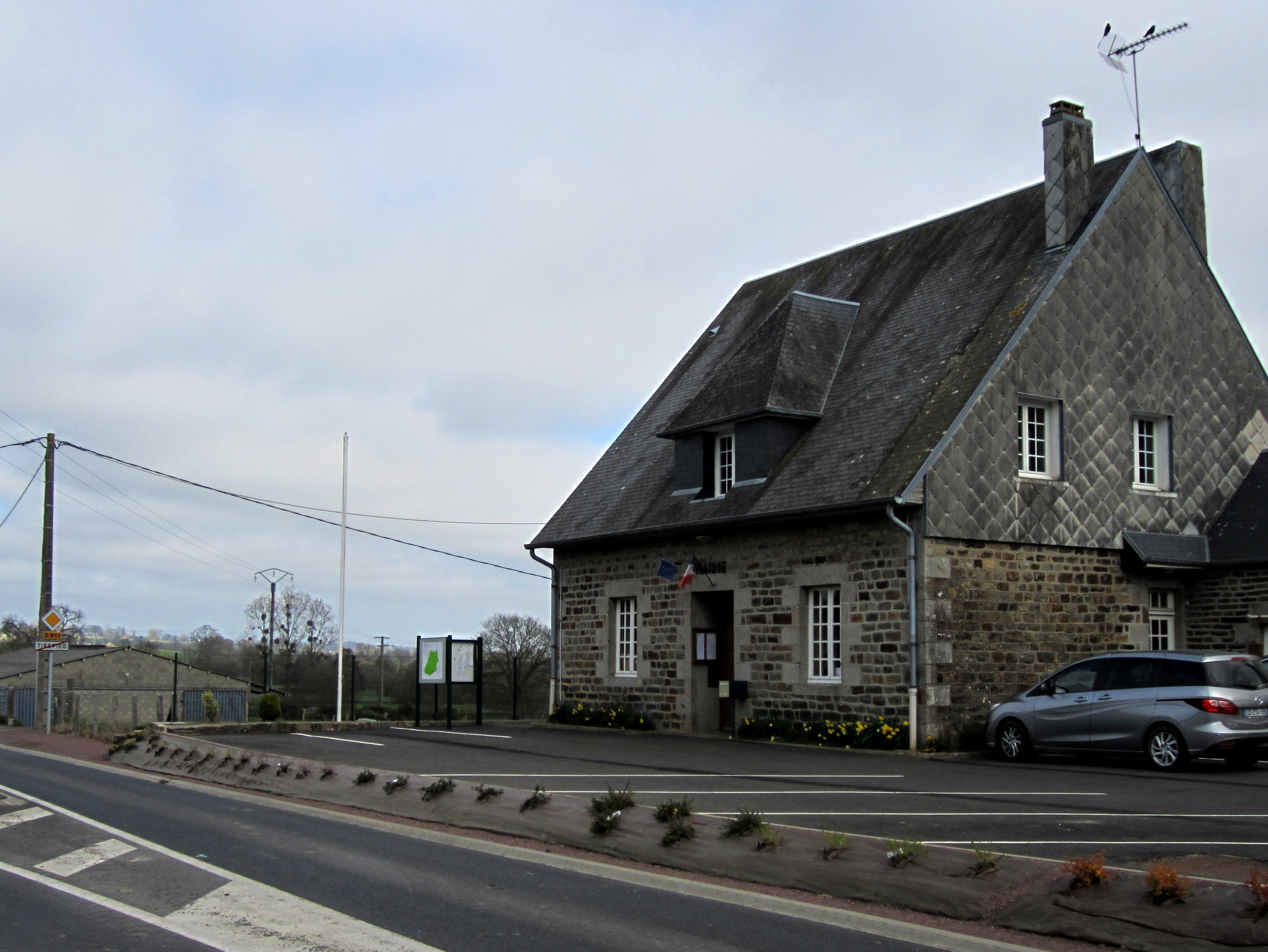
- Town hall
- Location of Tirepied-sur-Sée
- Location within France Location within Normandy
- Coordinates: 48°42′34″N 1°16′12″W
- Country: France
- Region: Normandy
- Department: Manche
- Arrondissement: Avranches
- Canton: Isigny-le-Buat
- Intercommunality: CA Mont-Saint-Michel-Normandie

Government
  - Mayor (2020–2026): Thierry Lemoine
- Area^{1}: 22.55 km^{2} (8.71 sq mi)
- Highest elevation: 149 m (489 ft)
- Lowest elevation: 8 m (26 ft)
- Population (2023): 957
  - Density: 42.4/km^{2} (110/sq mi)
- Time zone: UTC+01:00 (CET)
  - Summer (DST): UTC+02:00 (CEST)
- INSEE/Postal code: 50597 /50870
- ^{1} French Land Register data, which excludes lakes, ponds, glaciers > 1 km^{2} (0.386 sq mi or 247 acres) and river estuaries.

Tirepied-sur-Sée (French pronunciation: [tiʁpje syʁ se], literally Tirepied on Sée) is a commune in the Manche department in Normandy in north-western France. It is the result of the merger, on 1 January 2019, of the communes of Tirepied and La Gohannière.

== See also ==
- Communes of the Manche department
