= La Gohannière =

- Part of Tirepied-sur-Sée
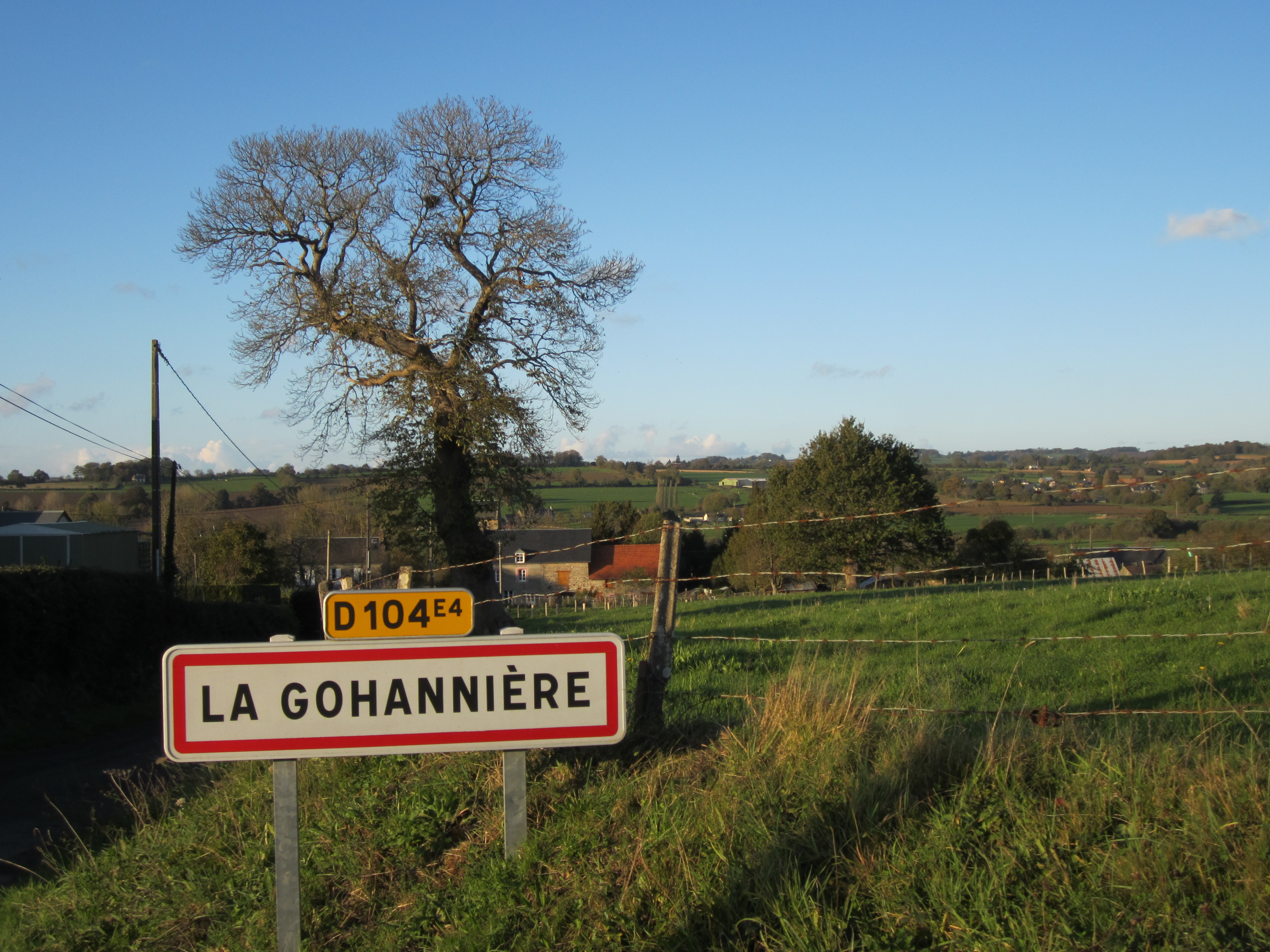
- Village entrance
- Location of La Gohannière
- Location within France Location within Normandy
- Coordinates: 48°42′25″N 1°15′13″W
- Country: France
- Region: Normandy
- Department: Manche
- Arrondissement: Avranches
- Canton: Isigny-le-Buat
- Commune: Tirepied-sur-Sée
- Area^{1}: 3.78 km^{2} (1.46 sq mi)
- Elevation: 40 m (130 ft)
- Highest elevation: 137 m (449 ft)
- Lowest elevation: 12 m (39 ft)
- Population (2016): 118
  - Density: 31.2/km^{2} (80.9/sq mi)
- Time zone: UTC+01:00 (CET)
  - Summer (DST): UTC+02:00 (CEST)
- Postal code: 50300
- ^{1} French Land Register data, which excludes lakes, ponds, glaciers > 1 km^{2} (0.386 sq mi or 247 acres) and river estuaries.

La Gohannière (French pronunciation: [la ɡɔanjɛʁ]) is a former commune in the Manche department in north-western France. On 1 January 2019, it was merged into the new commune of Tirepied-sur-Sée.

== See also ==
- Communes of the Manche department
