= Le Chefresne =

- Part of Percy-en-Normandie
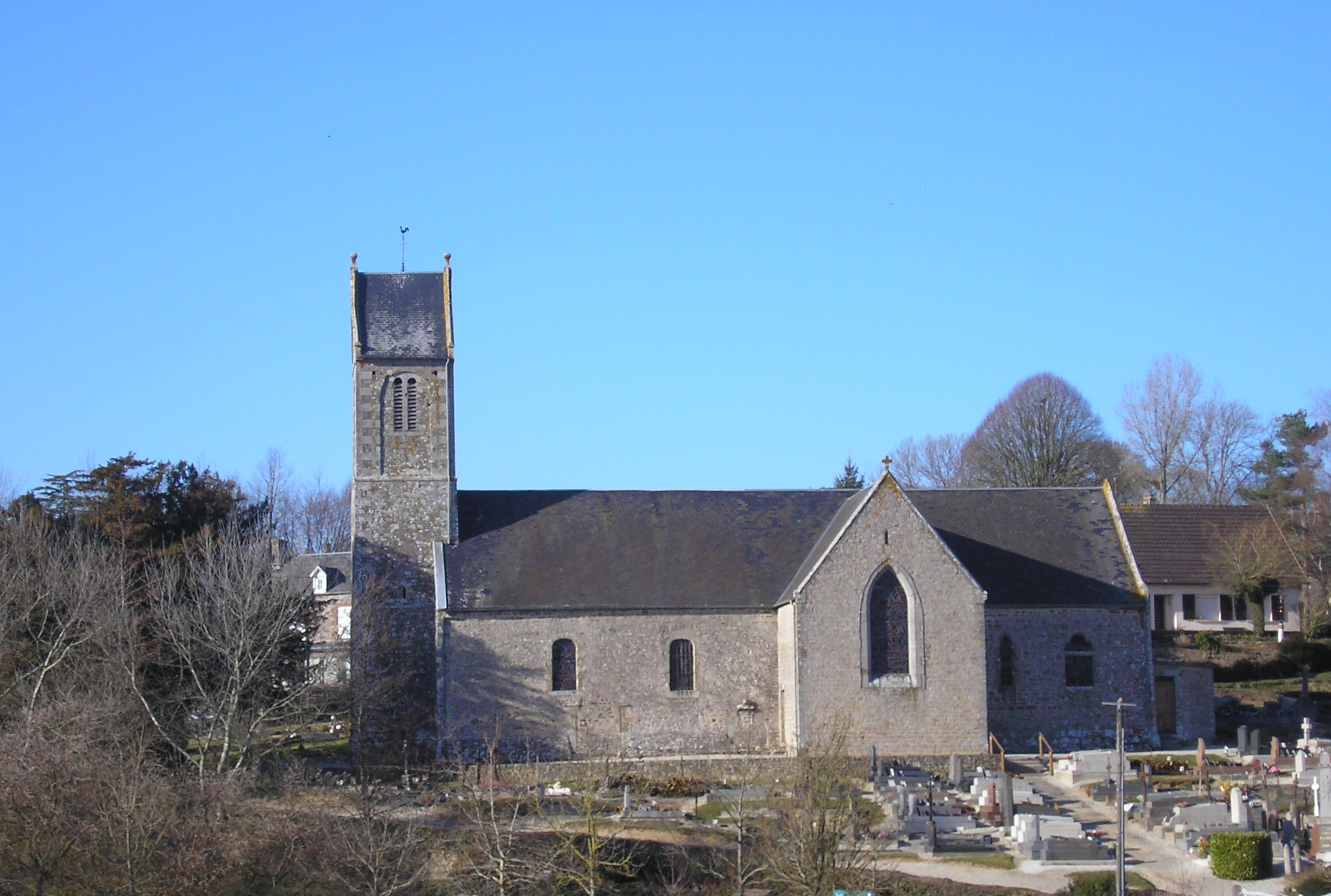
- The church of Saint-Pierre

- Coat of arms
- Location of Le Chefresne
- Location within France Location within Normandy
- Coordinates: 48°54′14″N 1°09′11″W
- Country: France
- Region: Normandy
- Department: Manche
- Arrondissement: Saint-Lô
- Canton: Villedieu-les-Poêles
- Commune: Percy-en-Normandie
- Area^{1}: 11.28 km^{2} (4.36 sq mi)
- Highest elevation: 228 m (748 ft)
- Lowest elevation: 115 m (377 ft)
- Population (2022): 258
  - Density: 22.9/km^{2} (59.2/sq mi)
- Demonym: Chefresnais
- Time zone: UTC+01:00 (CET)
  - Summer (DST): UTC+02:00 (CEST)
- Postal code: 50410
- ^{1} French Land Register data, which excludes lakes, ponds, glaciers > 1 km^{2} (0.386 sq mi or 247 acres) and river estuaries.

Le Chefresne (French pronunciation: [lə ʃəfʁɛn]) is a former commune in the Manche department in Normandy in north-western France. On 1 January 2016, it was merged into the new commune of Percy-en-Normandie.

== Heraldry ==
Arms of Le Chefresne	The arms of Le Chefresne are blazoned : Per pale argent and azure, a ash vert and a huguenot cross Or, and on a chief gules a leopard Or armed and langued azure.

== See also ==
- Communes of the Manche department
