= Saint-Aubin-la-Plaine =

- Commune
- Location of Saint-Aubin-la-Plaine
- Location within France Location within Pays de la Loire
- Coordinates: 46°30′25″N 1°03′29″W
- Country: France
- Region: Pays de la Loire
- Department: Vendée
- Arrondissement: Fontenay-le-Comte
- Canton: La Châtaigneraie
- Intercommunality: Sud Vendée Littoral

Government
  - Mayor (2020–2026): Dominique Gauvreau
- Area^{1}: 11.63 km^{2} (4.49 sq mi)
- Highest elevation: 52 m (171 ft)
- Lowest elevation: 4 m (13 ft)
- Population (2023): 529
  - Density: 45.5/km^{2} (118/sq mi)
- Time zone: UTC+01:00 (CET)
  - Summer (DST): UTC+02:00 (CEST)
- INSEE/Postal code: 85199 /85210
- ^{1} French Land Register data, which excludes lakes, ponds, glaciers > 1 km^{2} (0.386 sq mi or 247 acres) and river estuaries.

Saint-Aubin-la-Plaine (French pronunciation: [sɛ̃.t‿obɛ̃ la plɛn]) is a commune in the Vendée department in the Pays de la Loire region in western France.

== See also ==
- Communes of the Vendée department
