= Sainte-Radégonde-des-Noyers =

- Commune
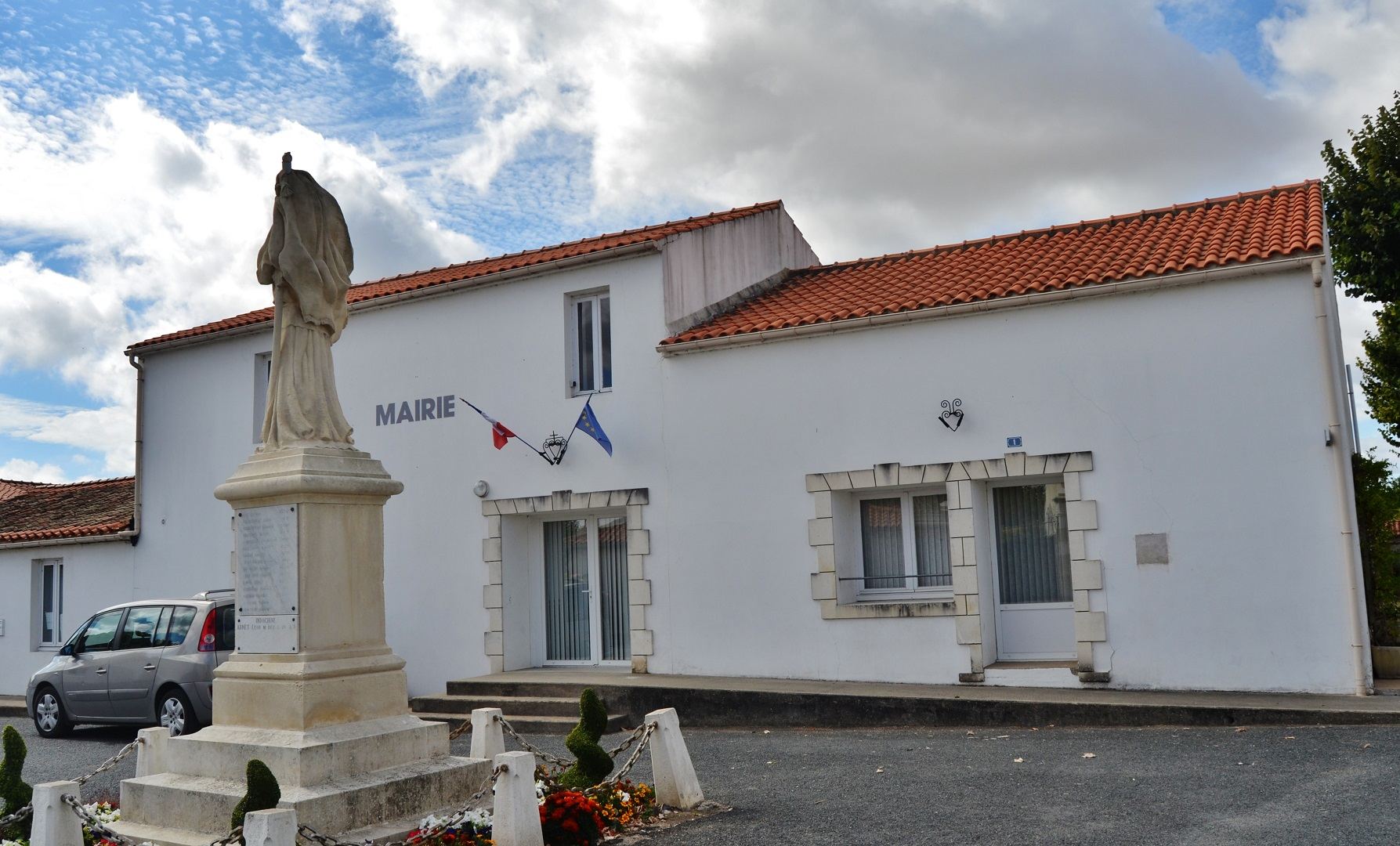
- The town hall in Sainte-Radégonde-des-Noyers

- Coat of arms
- Location of Sainte-Radégonde-des-Noyers
- Location within France Location within Pays de la Loire
- Coordinates: 46°22′32″N 1°03′35″W
- Country: France
- Region: Pays de la Loire
- Department: Vendée
- Arrondissement: Fontenay-le-Comte
- Canton: Luçon

Government
  - Mayor (2020–2026): René Froment
- Area^{1}: 31.13 km^{2} (12.02 sq mi)
- Highest elevation: 7 m (23 ft)
- Lowest elevation: 0 m (0 ft)
- Population (2023): 990
  - Density: 32/km^{2} (82/sq mi)
- Time zone: UTC+01:00 (CET)
  - Summer (DST): UTC+02:00 (CEST)
- INSEE/Postal code: 85267 /85450
- ^{1} French Land Register data, which excludes lakes, ponds, glaciers > 1 km^{2} (0.386 sq mi or 247 acres) and river estuaries.

Sainte-Radégonde-des-Noyers (French pronunciation: [sɛ̃t ʁadeɡɔ̃d de nwaje]) is a commune in the Vendée department in the Pays de la Loire region in western France.

== Notable people ==
- Théodore Tiffereau (1819–1909), photographer and alchemist

== See also ==
- Communes of the Vendée department
