= Vay, Loire-Atlantique =

Vay Vaï (Gallo) Gwez (Breton)
- Commune
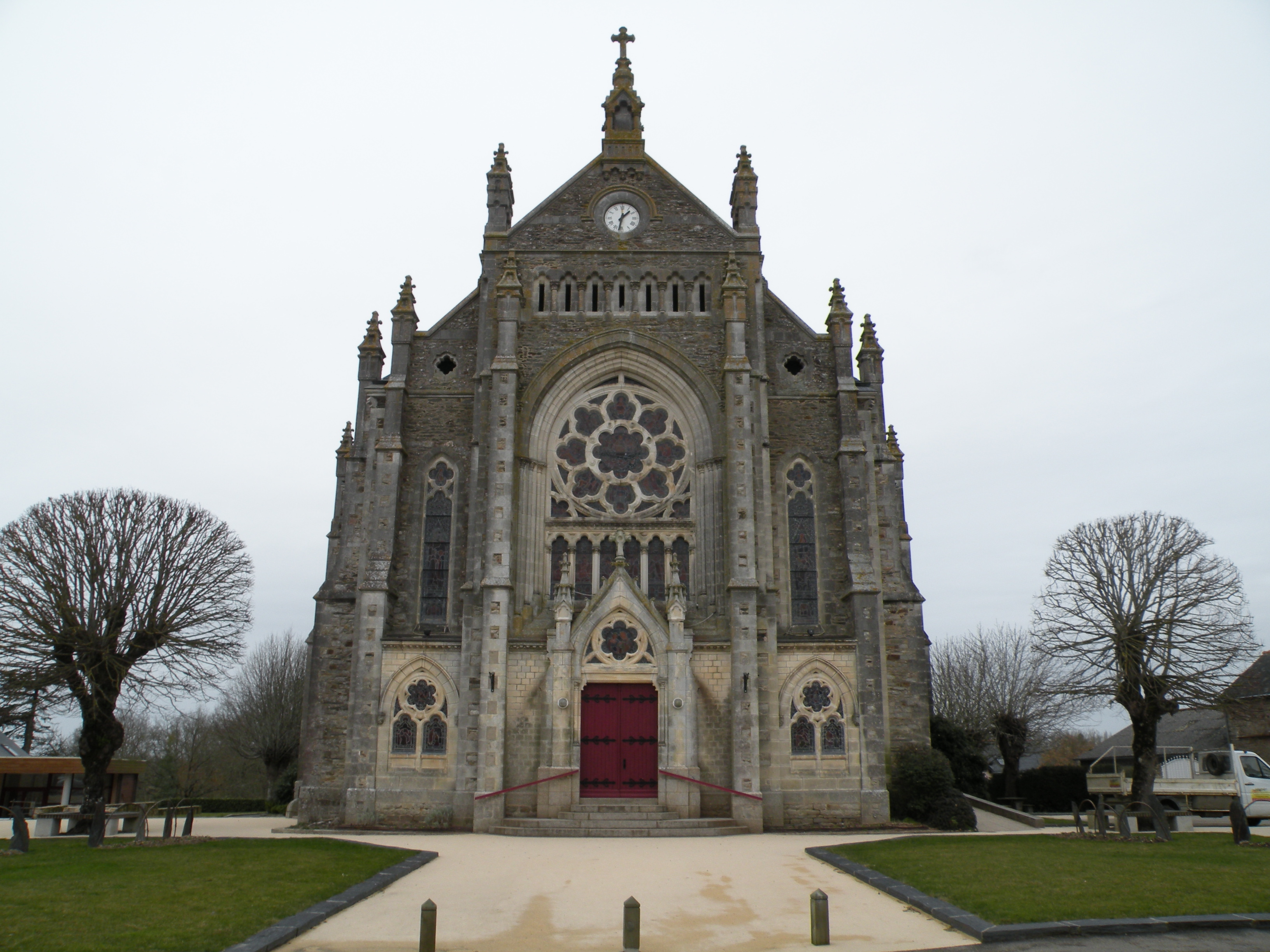
- The church in Vay

- Coat of arms
- Location of Vay
- Location within France Location within Pays de la Loire
- Coordinates: 47°33′20″N 1°42′00″W
- Country: France
- Region: Pays de la Loire
- Department: Loire-Atlantique
- Arrondissement: Châteaubriant-Ancenis
- Canton: Guémené-Penfao
- Intercommunality: CC de Nozay

Government
  - Mayor (2020–2026): Marie-Chantal Gautier
- Area^{1}: 36.13 km^{2} (13.95 sq mi)
- Highest elevation: 96 m (315 ft)
- Lowest elevation: 21 m (69 ft)
- Population (2023): 2,120
  - Density: 58.7/km^{2} (152/sq mi)
- Demonym(s): Vayennes, Vayens
- Time zone: UTC+01:00 (CET)
  - Summer (DST): UTC+02:00 (CEST)
- INSEE/Postal code: 44214 /44170
- Website: www.vay.fr
- ^{1} French Land Register data, which excludes lakes, ponds, glaciers > 1 km^{2} (0.386 sq mi or 247 acres) and river estuaries.

Vay (French pronunciation: [vɛ]; Gallo: Vaï, Breton: Gwez) is a commune in the Loire-Atlantique department in western France.

== Population ==
Historical population
Year	Pop.	±% p.a.
1968	1,219	—
1975	1,099	−1.47%
1982	1,119	+0.26%
1990	1,122	+0.03%
1999	1,228	+1.01%
2007	1,798	+4.88%
2012	2,012	+2.27%
2017	2,046	+0.34%
2023	2,120	+0.59%
Source: INSEE

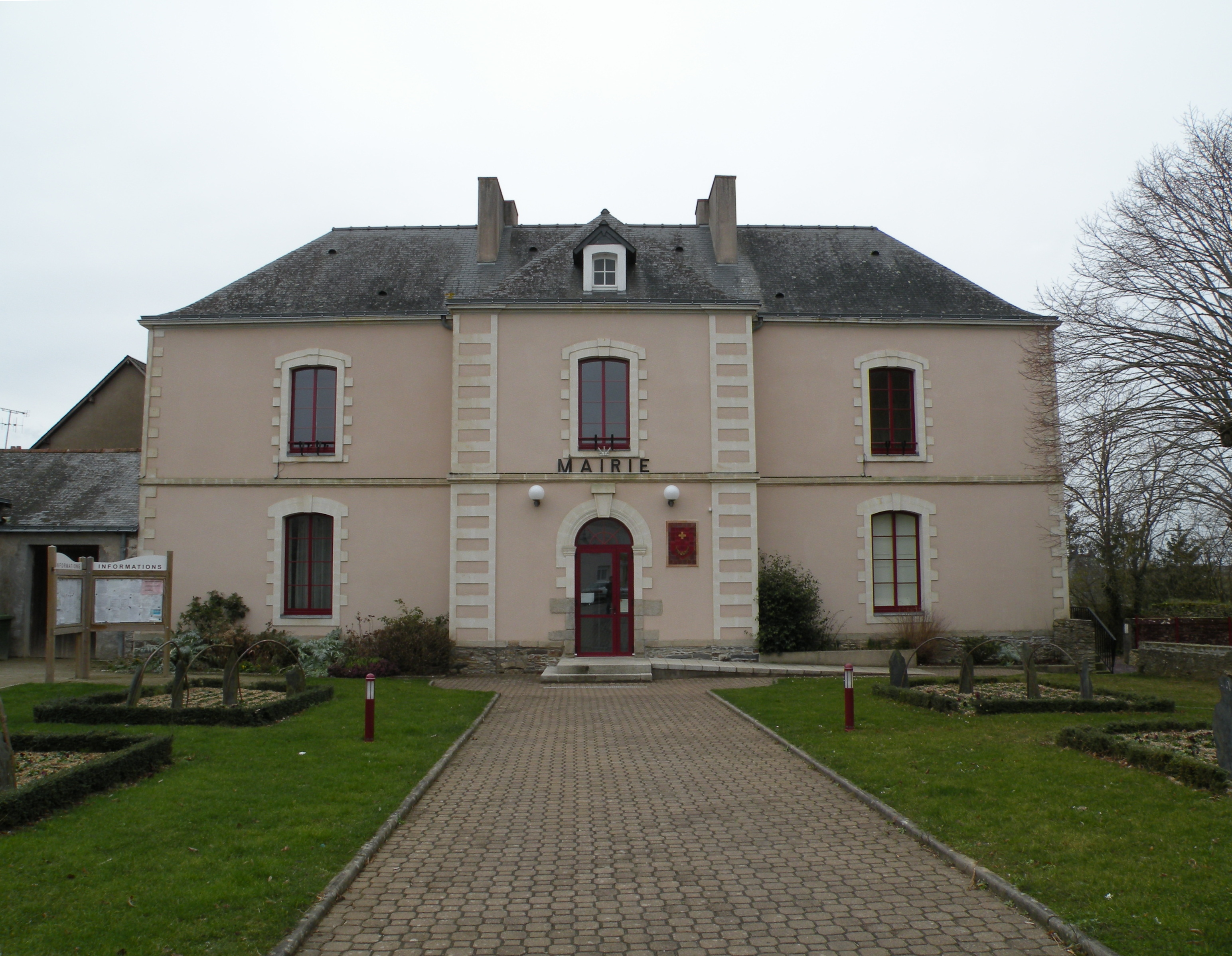
The town hall

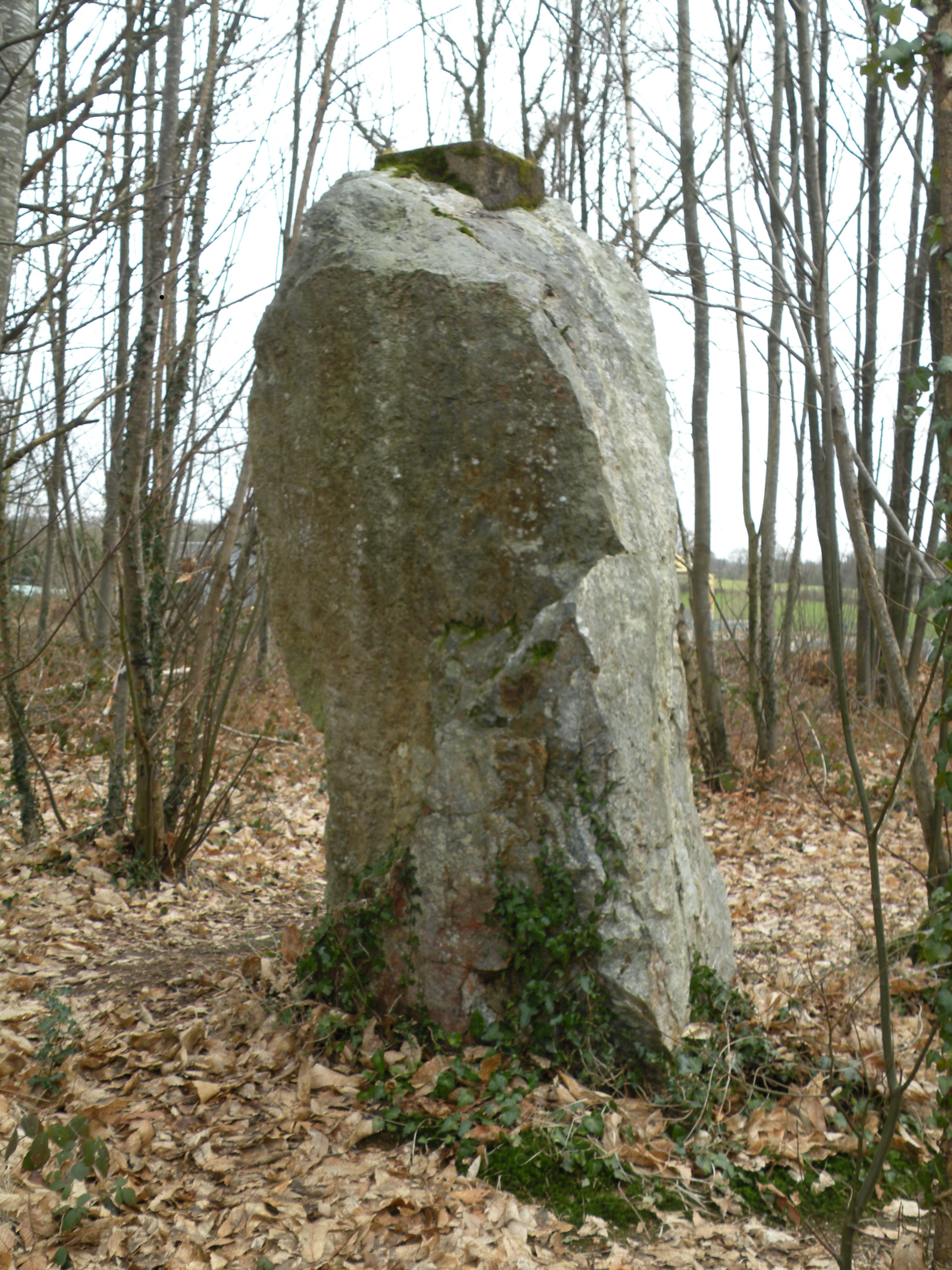
Drouetterie menhir (MH)

== See also ==
- Communes of the Loire-Atlantique department
