= Tirepied =

Commune in Manche, France

- Part of Tirepied-sur-Sée
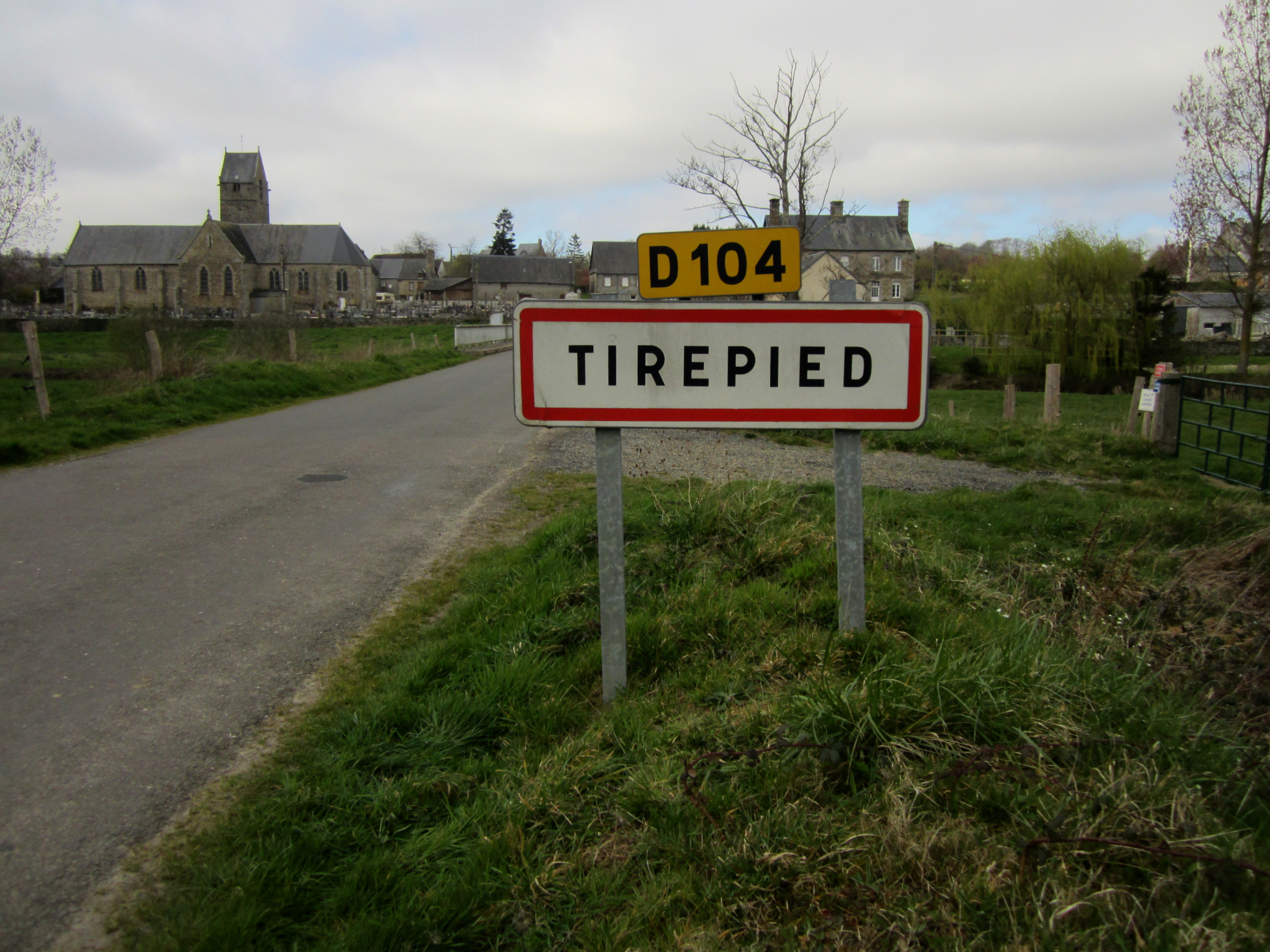
- Village entrance
- Location of Tirepied
- Location within France Location within Normandy
- Coordinates: 48°42′34″N 1°16′12″W
- Country: France
- Region: Normandy
- Department: Manche
- Arrondissement: Avranches
- Canton: Isigny-le-Buat
- Commune: Tirepied-sur-Sée
- Area^{1}: 18.77 km^{2} (7.25 sq mi)
- Highest elevation: 149 m (489 ft)
- Lowest elevation: 8 m (26 ft)
- Population (2016): 818
  - Density: 43.6/km^{2} (113/sq mi)
- Time zone: UTC+01:00 (CET)
  - Summer (DST): UTC+02:00 (CEST)
- Postal code: 50870
- ^{1} French Land Register data, which excludes lakes, ponds, glaciers > 1 km^{2} (0.386 sq mi or 247 acres) and river estuaries.

Tirepied (French pronunciation: [tiʁpje]) is a former commune in the Manche department in Normandy in north-western France. On 1 January 2019, it was merged into the new commune of Tirepied-sur-Sée.

== See also ==
- Communes of the Manche department
