= Puilboreau =

- Commune
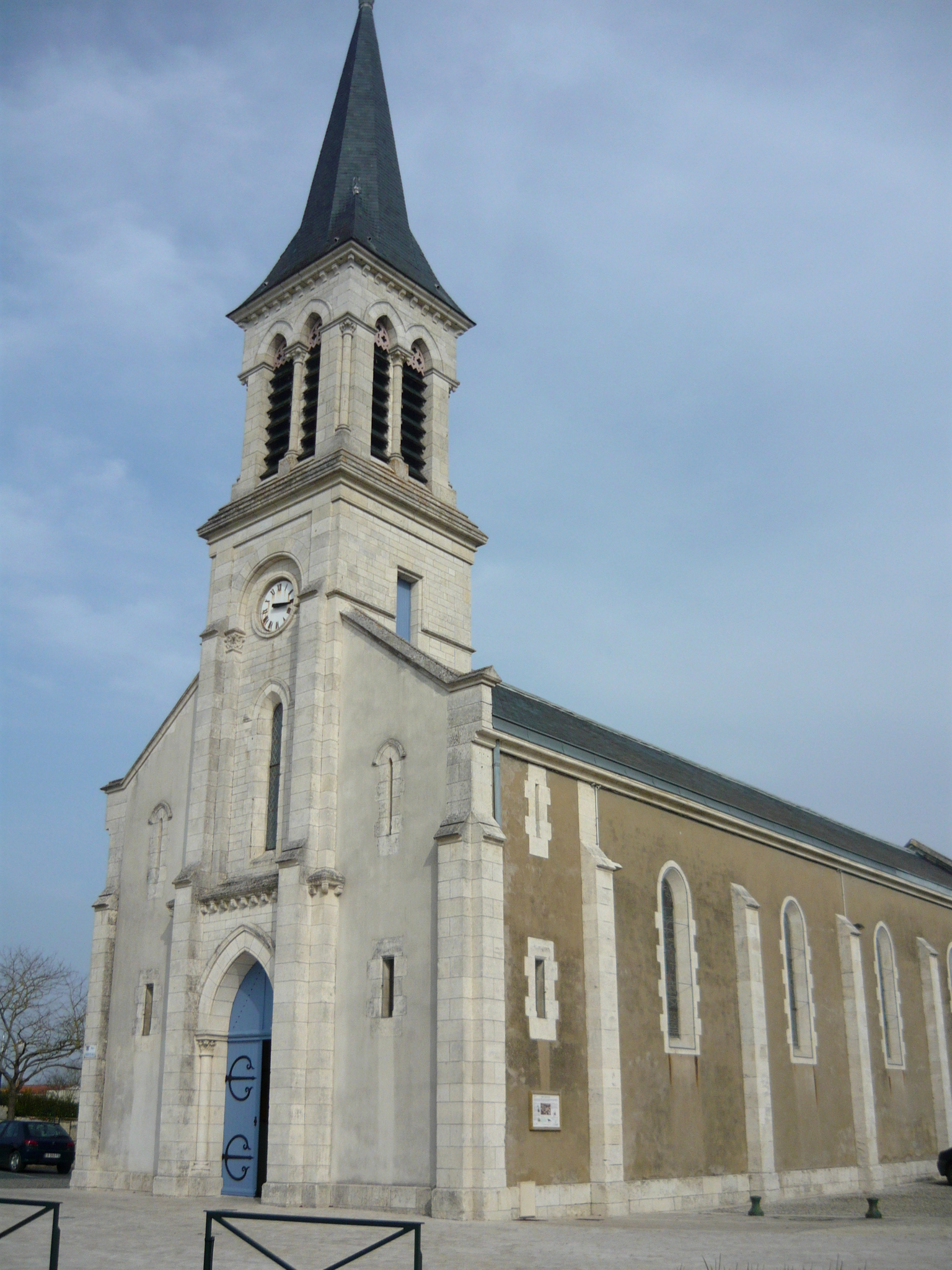
- The church in Puilboreau

- Coat of arms
- Location of Puilboreau
- Location within France Location within Nouvelle-Aquitaine
- Coordinates: 46°11′11″N 1°06′57″W
- Country: France
- Region: Nouvelle-Aquitaine
- Department: Charente-Maritime
- Arrondissement: La Rochelle
- Canton: Aytré
- Intercommunality: CA La Rochelle

Government
  - Mayor (2020–2026): Alain Drapeau
- Area^{1}: 7.88 km^{2} (3.04 sq mi)
- Highest elevation: 35 m (115 ft)
- Lowest elevation: 7 m (23 ft)
- Population (2023): 6,765
  - Density: 859/km^{2} (2,220/sq mi)
- Time zone: UTC+01:00 (CET)
  - Summer (DST): UTC+02:00 (CEST)
- INSEE/Postal code: 17291 /17138
- ^{1} French Land Register data, which excludes lakes, ponds, glaciers > 1 km^{2} (0.386 sq mi or 247 acres) and river estuaries.

Puilboreau (French pronunciation: [pɥilbɔʁo]) is a commune in the Charente-Maritime department in southwestern France.

== Population ==
Its residents are called Puilborains (male) and Puilboraines (female) in French.

Historical population

Year	Pop.	±% p.a.
1901	859	—
1921	832	−0.16%
1946	1,056	+0.96%
1962	1,342	+1.51%
1968	1,484	+1.69%
1975	2,109	+5.15%
1982	2,634	+3.23%

Year	Pop.	±% p.a.
1990	4,067	+5.58%
1999	4,622	+1.43%
2007	5,101	+1.24%
2012	5,651	+2.07%
2017	6,182	+1.81%
2023	6,765	+1.51%

Source: EHESS and INSEE (1968-2023)

== See also ==
- Communes of the Charente-Maritime department
