= Poilley, Manche =

Poilley
- Commune
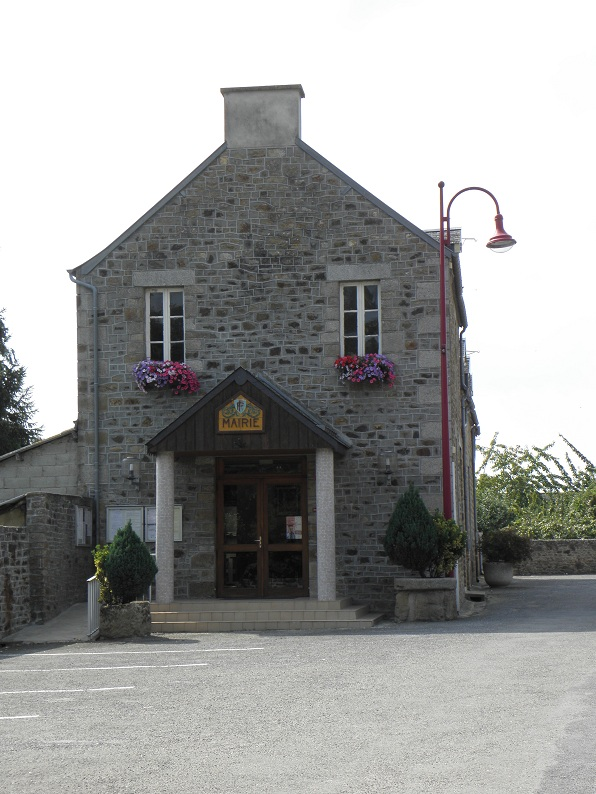
- Town hall
- Location of Poilley
- Location within France Location within Normandy
- Coordinates: 48°37′09″N 1°18′32″W
- Country: France
- Region: Normandy
- Department: Manche
- Arrondissement: Avranches
- Canton: Pontorson
- Intercommunality: CA Mont-Saint-Michel-Normandie

Government
  - Mayor (2020–2026): Pierre Michel Viel
- Area^{1}: 12.65 km^{2} (4.88 sq mi)
- Elevation: 15 m (49 ft)
- Highest elevation: 72 m (236 ft)
- Lowest elevation: 5 m (16 ft)
- Population (2023): 969
  - Density: 76.6/km^{2} (198/sq mi)
- Demonym: Polucéens
- Time zone: UTC+01:00 (CET)
  - Summer (DST): UTC+02:00 (CEST)
- INSEE/Postal code: 50407 /50220
- ^{1} French Land Register data, which excludes lakes, ponds, glaciers > 1 km^{2} (0.386 sq mi or 247 acres) and river estuaries.

Poilley (French pronunciation: [pɔjɛ]) is a commune in the Manche department in Normandy in north-western France.

== See also ==
- Communes of the Manche department
