= Percy, Manche =

Percy
- Part of Percy-en-Normandie
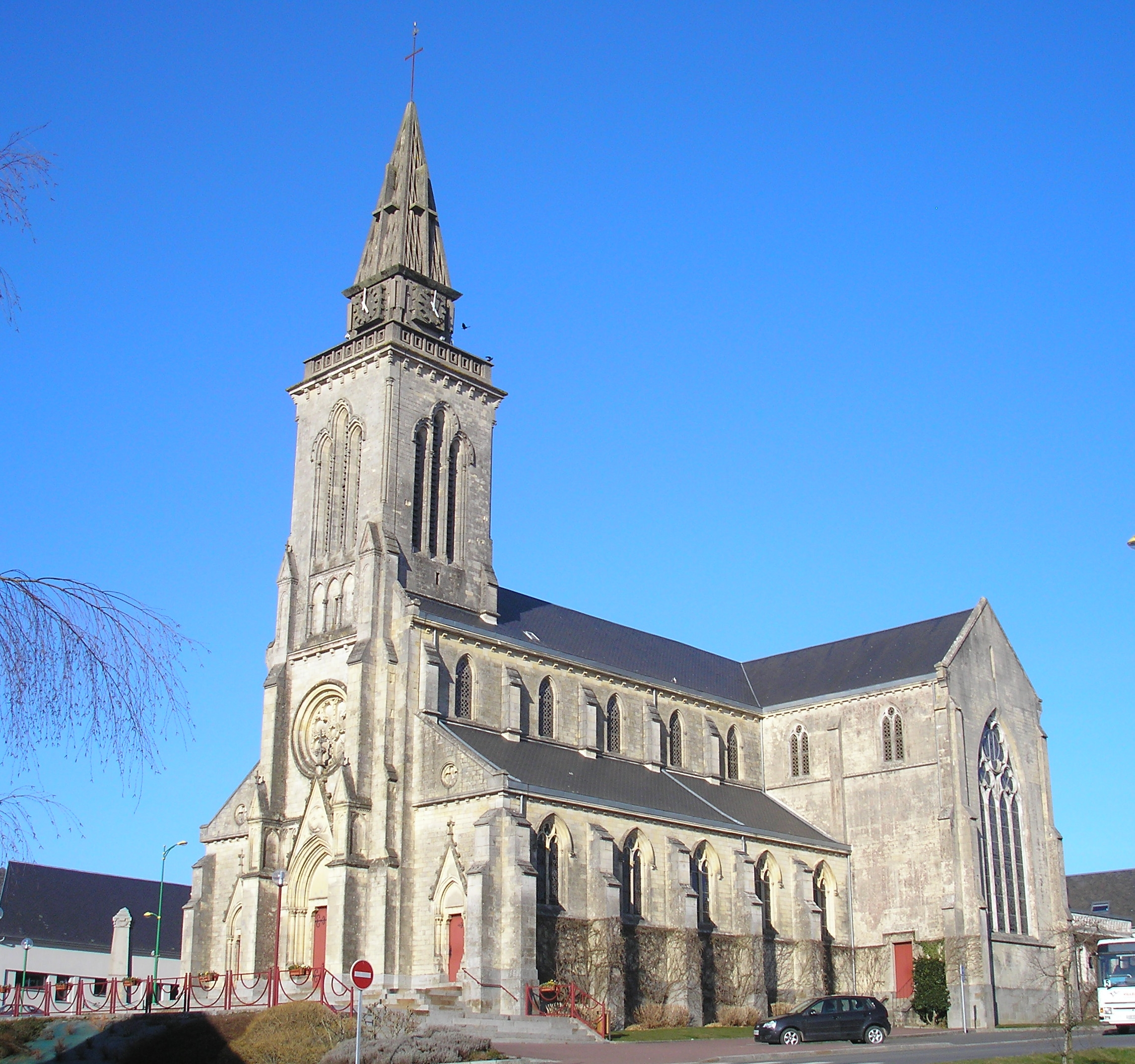
- The church of Saint-Jean-Baptiste
- Location of Percy
- Location within France Location within Normandy
- Coordinates: 48°55′03″N 1°11′17″W
- Country: France
- Region: Normandy
- Department: Manche
- Arrondissement: Saint-Lô
- Canton: Villedieu-les-Poêles
- Commune: Percy-en-Normandie
- Area^{1}: 37.04 km^{2} (14.30 sq mi)
- Elevation: 105 m (344 ft)
- Highest elevation: 275 m (902 ft)
- Lowest elevation: 60 m (200 ft)
- Population (2022): 2,370
  - Density: 64.0/km^{2} (166/sq mi)
- Demonym: Percyais
- Time zone: UTC+01:00 (CET)
  - Summer (DST): UTC+02:00 (CEST)
- Postal code: 50410
- Website: percy.fr
- ^{1} French Land Register data, which excludes lakes, ponds, glaciers > 1 km^{2} (0.386 sq mi or 247 acres) and river estuaries.

Percy (French pronunciation: [pɛʁsi]) is a village and former commune in the Manche department in Normandy in north-western France. On 1 January 2016, it was merged into the new commune of Percy-en-Normandie.

== Heraldry ==
Arms of Percy	The arms of Percy are blazoned : Sable, a chief indented Or. these arms are borrowed from the de Percy family, lords of Montchamps, Maisoncelle etc.

== See also ==
- Communes of the Manche department
