= Brix, Manche =

Brix
- Commune
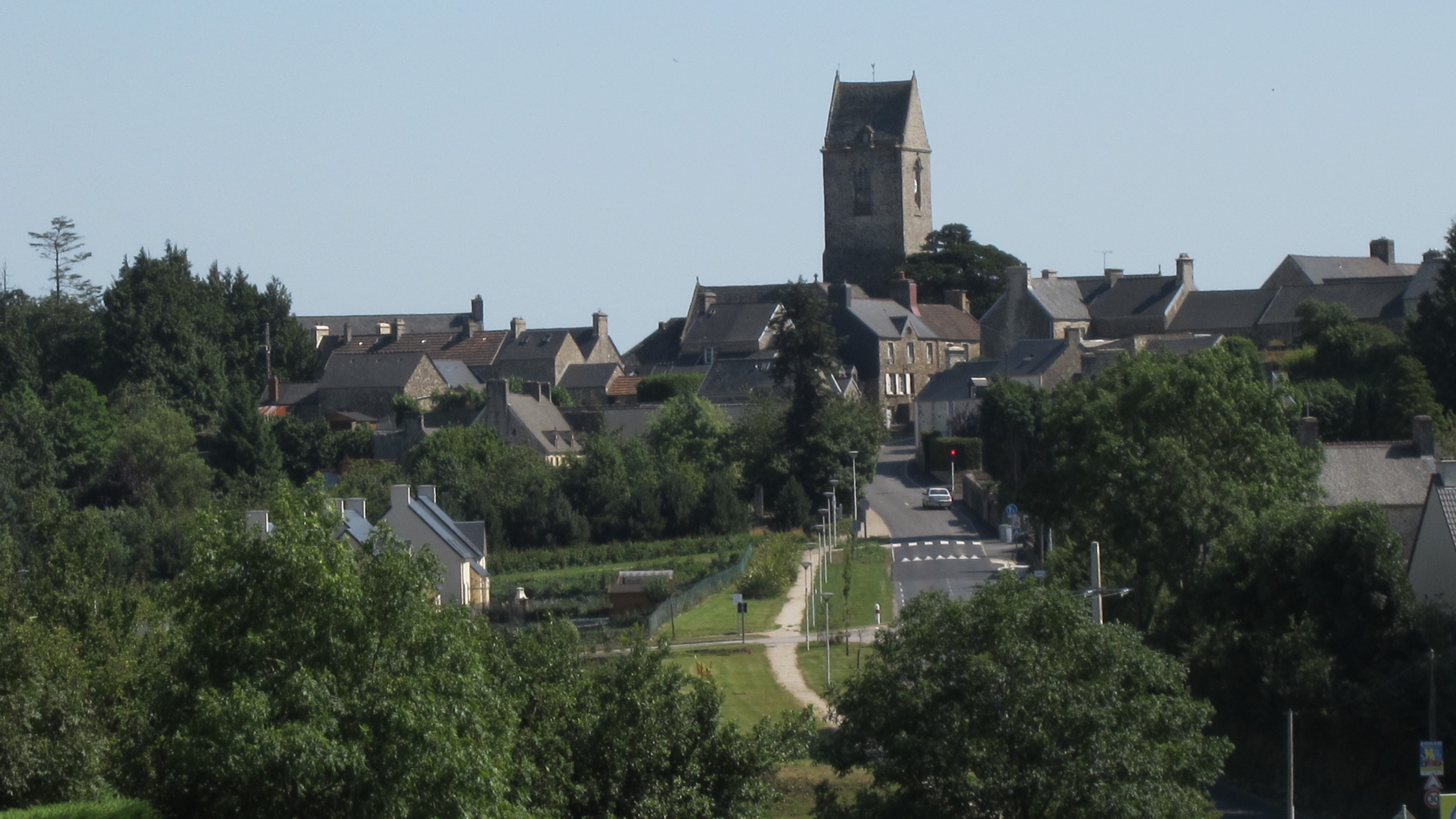
- View of the village
- Location of Brix
- Location within France Location within Normandy
- Coordinates: 49°32′45″N 1°34′40″W
- Country: France
- Region: Normandy
- Department: Manche
- Arrondissement: Cherbourg
- Canton: Valognes
- Intercommunality: CA Cotentin

Government
  - Mayor (2023–2026): Sophie Buhot
- Area^{1}: 32.16 km^{2} (12.42 sq mi)
- Elevation: 154 m (505 ft)
- Population (2023): 2,165
  - Density: 67.32/km^{2} (174.4/sq mi)
- Time zone: UTC+01:00 (CET)
  - Summer (DST): UTC+02:00 (CEST)
- INSEE/Postal code: 50087 /50700
- ^{1} French Land Register data, which excludes lakes, ponds, glaciers > 1 km^{2} (0.386 sq mi or 247 acres) and river estuaries.

Brix (French pronunciation: [bʁi]) is a commune in the Manche department in Normandy in northwestern France.

== History ==
The origin of the name derives from the Gaulish root brut-.

Brix is known primarily as being the assumed origin of the Bruce family, which emigrated to Britain in the Middle Ages and settled in northern England and then southern Scotland. The family became a royal house with the accession of Robert the Bruce in 1306.

The ruins of the castle of Brix are located near the village.

== Population ==
Historical population

Year	Pop.	±% p.a.
1793	2,653	—
1821	3,250	+0.73%
1846	2,807	−0.58%
1872	2,289	−0.78%
1901	1,931	−0.58%
1926	1,675	−0.57%
1946	1,503	−0.54%
1962	1,447	−0.24%
1968	1,357	−1.06%

Year	Pop.	±% p.a.
1975	1,323	−0.36%
1982	1,600	+2.75%
1990	1,828	+1.68%
1999	1,928	+0.59%
2007	2,001	+0.47%
2012	2,096	+0.93%
2017	2,131	+0.33%
2023	2,165	+0.26%

Source: EHESS and INSEE (1968-2023)

== Sights ==
A family known variously as Bruis, Brus, Bruz is said to be responsible for the Adam Castle, the oldest monument in Brix. Very little remains of the castle.

The main square of Brix is called Place Robert Bruce. Many prominent members of the family mentioned above were named "Robert", including: Robert de Brus (1078–1138), the first member of the family known to have resided in Britain, and his descendant Robert the Bruce (1274–1329), also known as Robert I, King of Scotland.

=== Events ===
On the first weekend of October, the commune holds the St. Denis Fair, a tradition of the Cotentin.

== See also ==
- Communes of the Manche department
