= Chaillé-les-Marais =

- Commune
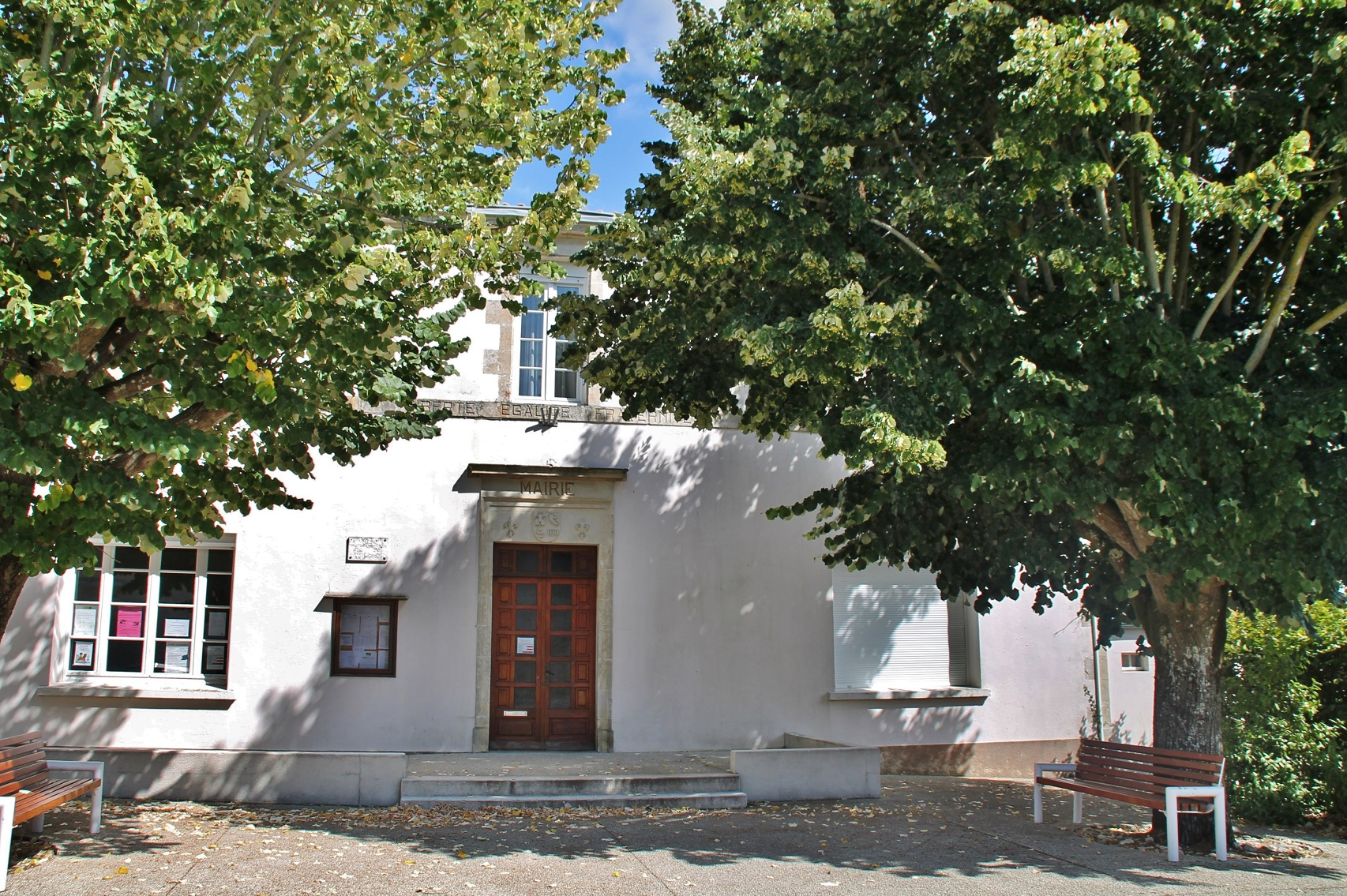
- The town hall in Chaillé-les-Marais

- Coat of arms
- Location of Chaillé-les-Marais
- Location within France Location within Pays de la Loire
- Coordinates: 46°23′51″N 1°01′17″W
- Country: France
- Region: Pays de la Loire
- Department: Vendée
- Arrondissement: Fontenay-le-Comte
- Canton: Luçon

Government
  - Mayor (2020–2026): Antoine Métais
- Area^{1}: 39.96 km^{2} (15.43 sq mi)
- Highest elevation: 23 m (75 ft)
- Lowest elevation: 0 m (0 ft)
- Population (2023): 1,924
  - Density: 48.15/km^{2} (124.7/sq mi)
- Time zone: UTC+01:00 (CET)
  - Summer (DST): UTC+02:00 (CEST)
- INSEE/Postal code: 85042 /85450
- ^{1} French Land Register data, which excludes lakes, ponds, glaciers > 1 km^{2} (0.386 sq mi or 247 acres) and river estuaries.

Chaillé-les-Marais (French pronunciation: [ʃaje le maʁɛ]) is a commune in the Vendée department in the region of Pays de la Loire, western France.

== See also ==
- Communes of the Vendée department
