= Saint-Jean-de-Beugné =

- Part of Saint-Jean-d'Hermine
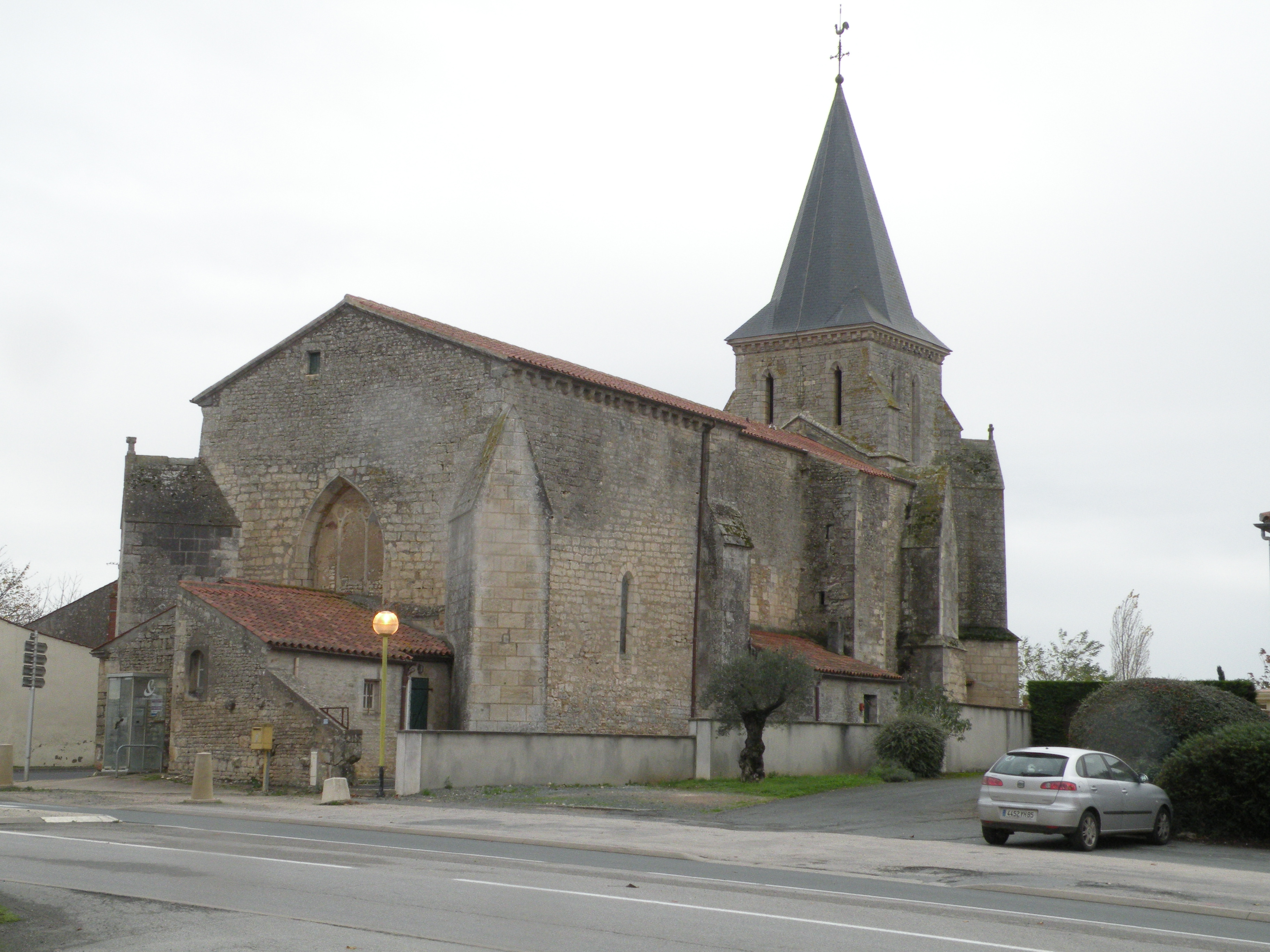
- The church in Saint-Jean-de-Beugné
- Location of Saint-Jean-de-Beugné
- Location within France Location within Pays de la Loire
- Coordinates: 46°31′21″N 1°05′10″W
- Country: France
- Region: Pays de la Loire
- Department: Vendée
- Arrondissement: Fontenay-le-Comte
- Canton: La Châtaigneraie
- Commune: Saint-Jean-d'Hermine
- Area^{1}: 13.36 km^{2} (5.16 sq mi)
- Highest elevation: 51 m (167 ft)
- Lowest elevation: 9 m (30 ft)
- Population (2022): 631
  - Density: 47.2/km^{2} (122/sq mi)
- Demonym: Beugnolais(e)
- Time zone: UTC+01:00 (CET)
  - Summer (DST): UTC+02:00 (CEST)
- Postal code: 85210
- ^{1} French Land Register data, which excludes lakes, ponds, glaciers > 1 km^{2} (0.386 sq mi or 247 acres) and river estuaries.

Saint-Jean-de-Beugné (French pronunciation: [sɛ̃ ʒɑ̃ də bøɲe]) is a former commune in the Vendée department, region of Pays de la Loire, western France. On 1 January 2025, it was merged into the new commune of Saint-Jean-d'Hermine.

It being known for the briochery Sicard, established 1973 by Roger Sicard.

== Geography ==
The river Smagne forms most of the commune's north-western border.

== See also ==
- Communes of the Vendée department
