= Sainte-Gemme-la-Plaine =

- Commune
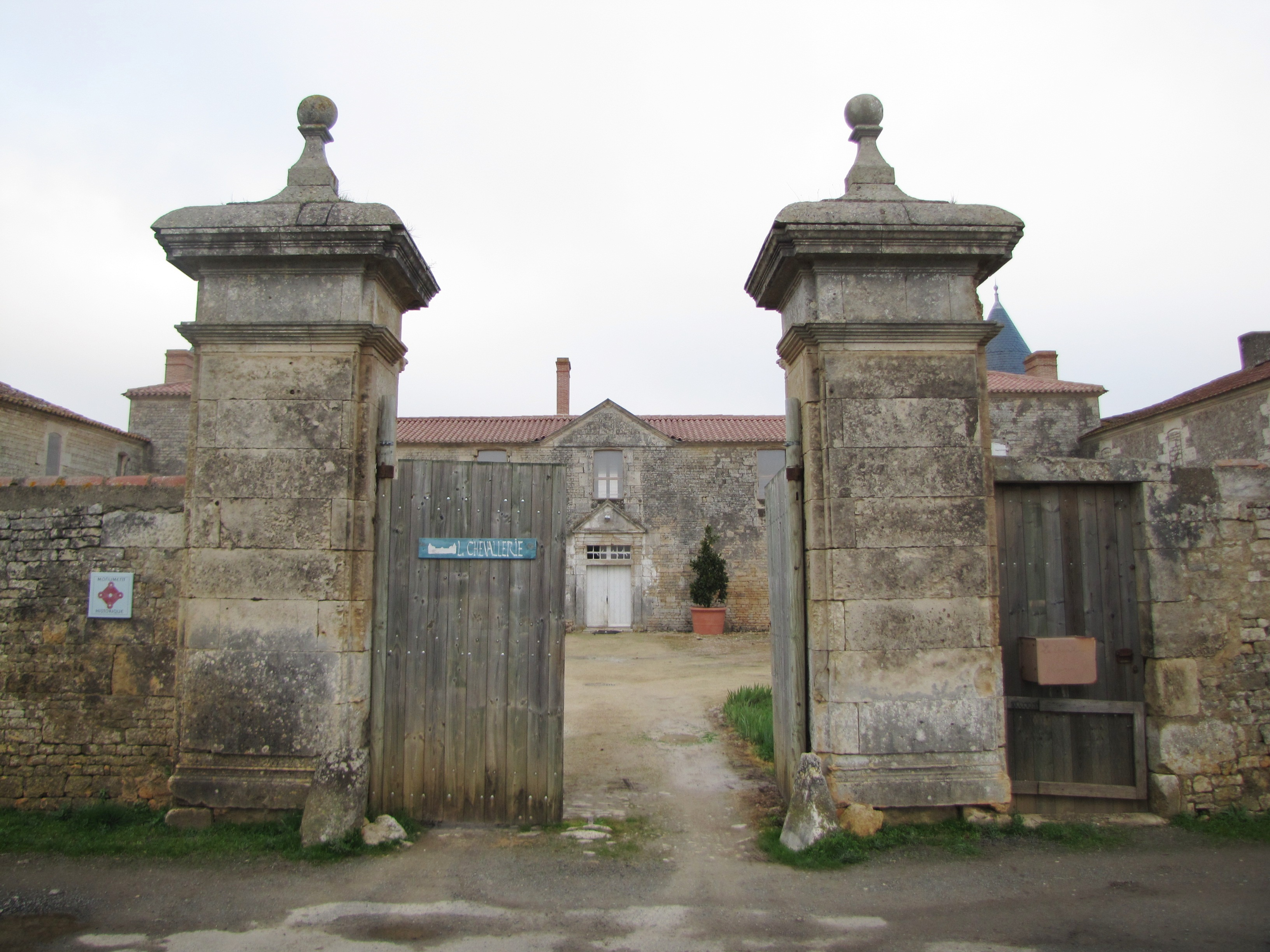
- The Château de la Chevallerie, in Sainte-Gemme-la-Plaine

- Coat of arms
- Location of Sainte-Gemme-la-Plaine
- Location within France Location within Pays de la Loire
- Coordinates: 46°29′06″N 1°06′37″W
- Country: France
- Region: Pays de la Loire
- Department: Vendée
- Arrondissement: Fontenay-le-Comte
- Canton: Luçon
- Intercommunality: Sud Vendée Littoral

Government
  - Mayor (2020–2026): Pierre Careil
- Area^{1}: 35.52 km^{2} (13.71 sq mi)
- Elevation: 13 m (43 ft)
- Highest elevation: 44 m (144 ft)
- Lowest elevation: 0 m (0 ft)
- Population (2023): 2,084
  - Density: 58.67/km^{2} (152.0/sq mi)
- Time zone: UTC+01:00 (CET)
  - Summer (DST): UTC+02:00 (CEST)
- INSEE/Postal code: 85216 /85400
- ^{1} French Land Register data, which excludes lakes, ponds, glaciers > 1 km^{2} (0.386 sq mi or 247 acres) and river estuaries.

Sainte-Gemme-la-Plaine (French pronunciation: [sɛ̃t ʒɛm la plɛn]) is a commune in the Vendée department in the Pays de la Loire region in western France.

== Geography ==
=== Climate ===
Sainte-Gemme-la-Plaine has an oceanic climate (Köppen climate classification Cfb). The average annual temperature in Sainte-Gemme-la-Plaine is 13.0 °C (55.4 °F). The average annual rainfall is 809.1 mm (31.85 in) with October as the wettest month. The temperatures are highest on average in August, at around 20.1 °C (68.2 °F), and lowest in January, at around 6.4 °C (43.5 °F). The highest temperature ever recorded in Sainte-Gemme-la-Plaine was 41.7 °C (107.1 °F) on 18 July 2022; the coldest temperature ever recorded was −15.0 °C (5.0 °F) on 15 January 1985.

Climate data for Sainte-Gemme-la-Plaine (1991−2020 normals, extremes 1952−present)
Month	Jan	Feb	Mar	Apr	May	Jun	Jul	Aug	Sep	Oct	Nov	Dec	Year
Record high °C (°F)	16.4 (61.5)	22.5 (72.5)	25.5 (77.9)	30.0 (86.0)	35.0 (95.0)	39.8 (103.6)	41.7 (107.1)	39.7 (103.5)	35.8 (96.4)	30.8 (87.4)	22.9 (73.2)	19.8 (67.6)	41.7 (107.1)
Mean daily maximum °C (°F)	9.6 (49.3)	10.8 (51.4)	14.1 (57.4)	16.8 (62.2)	20.5 (68.9)	24.0 (75.2)	26.1 (79.0)	26.3 (79.3)	23.3 (73.9)	18.5 (65.3)	13.4 (56.1)	10.1 (50.2)	17.8 (64.0)
Daily mean °C (°F)	6.4 (43.5)	6.8 (44.2)	9.4 (48.9)	11.6 (52.9)	15.2 (59.4)	18.4 (65.1)	20.1 (68.2)	20.1 (68.2)	17.3 (63.1)	14.0 (57.2)	9.6 (49.3)	6.8 (44.2)	13.0 (55.4)
Mean daily minimum °C (°F)	3.3 (37.9)	2.9 (37.2)	4.7 (40.5)	6.4 (43.5)	9.9 (49.8)	12.7 (54.9)	14.0 (57.2)	13.9 (57.0)	11.4 (52.5)	9.4 (48.9)	5.8 (42.4)	3.5 (38.3)	8.2 (46.8)
Record low °C (°F)	−15.0 (5.0)	−13.8 (7.2)	−9.1 (15.6)	−5.0 (23.0)	−1.8 (28.8)	1.9 (35.4)	4.0 (39.2)	4.5 (40.1)	0.5 (32.9)	−2.0 (28.4)	−8.0 (17.6)	−11.0 (12.2)	−15.0 (5.0)
Average precipitation mm (inches)	81.9 (3.22)	60.8 (2.39)	60.6 (2.39)	60.9 (2.40)	58.1 (2.29)	41.3 (1.63)	44.1 (1.74)	47.4 (1.87)	70.6 (2.78)	94.8 (3.73)	94.4 (3.72)	94.2 (3.71)	809.1 (31.85)
Average precipitation days (≥ 1.0 mm)	12.6	9.8	9.8	10.0	9.4	7.2	6.8	6.5	7.6	11.8	12.4	13.0	117.0
Source: Météo-France

== Population ==
Historical population
Year	Pop.	±% p.a.
1968	1,283	—
1975	1,170	−1.31%
1982	1,235	+0.78%
1990	1,350	+1.12%
1999	1,574	+1.72%
2007	1,817	+1.81%
2012	2,012	+2.06%
2017	2,044	+0.32%
2023	2,084	+0.32%
Source: INSEE

== See also ==
- Communes of the Vendée department
