= Périgny, Charente-Maritime =

Périgny
- Commune
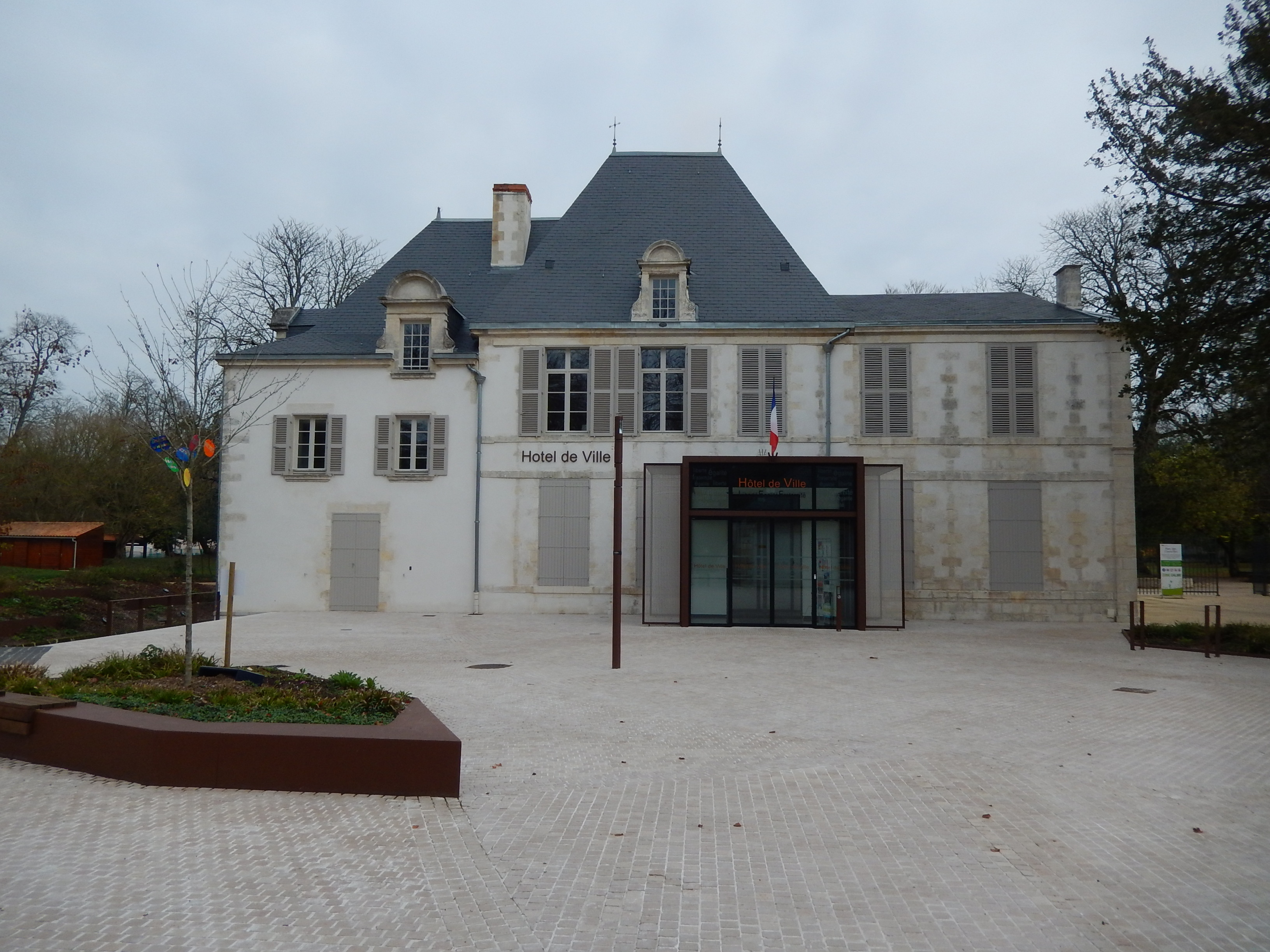
- The town hall in Périgny

- Coat of arms
- Location of Périgny
- Location within France Location within Nouvelle-Aquitaine
- Coordinates: 46°09′12″N 1°05′43″W
- Country: France
- Region: Nouvelle-Aquitaine
- Department: Charente-Maritime
- Arrondissement: La Rochelle
- Canton: Aytré
- Intercommunality: CA La Rochelle

Government
  - Mayor (2020–2026): Marie Ligonniere
- Area^{1}: 10.78 km^{2} (4.16 sq mi)
- Highest elevation: 36 m (118 ft)
- Lowest elevation: 2 m (6.6 ft)
- Population (2023): 8,877
  - Density: 823.5/km^{2} (2,133/sq mi)
- Time zone: UTC+01:00 (CET)
  - Summer (DST): UTC+02:00 (CEST)
- INSEE/Postal code: 17274 /17180
- ^{1} French Land Register data, which excludes lakes, ponds, glaciers > 1 km^{2} (0.386 sq mi or 247 acres) and river estuaries.

Périgny (French pronunciation: [peʁiɲi]) is a commune in the Charente-Maritime department, southwestern France. Its inhabitants are named the Pérignaciens and Pérignaciennes. Perigny is fully part of the unité urbaine of La Rochelle extending its eastern urban toward Dompierre-sur-Mer. Following the quick urban growth, it has become the 3rd town of the La Rochelle area and the 6th town of the Charente-Maritime department.

== Population ==
Historical population
| Year | Pop. | ±% p.a. |
|---|---|---|
| 1968 | 1,674 | — |
| 1975 | 2,445 | +5.56% |
| 1982 | 3,455 | +5.06% |
| 1990 | 4,129 | +2.25% |
| 1999 | 6,003 | +4.25% |
| 2007 | 6,709 | +1.40% |
| 2012 | 7,633 | +2.61% |
| 2017 | 8,428 | +2.00% |
| 2023 | 8,877 | +0.87% |
Source: INSEE

== See also ==
- Communes of the Charente-Maritime department
