= Bournezeau =

- Commune
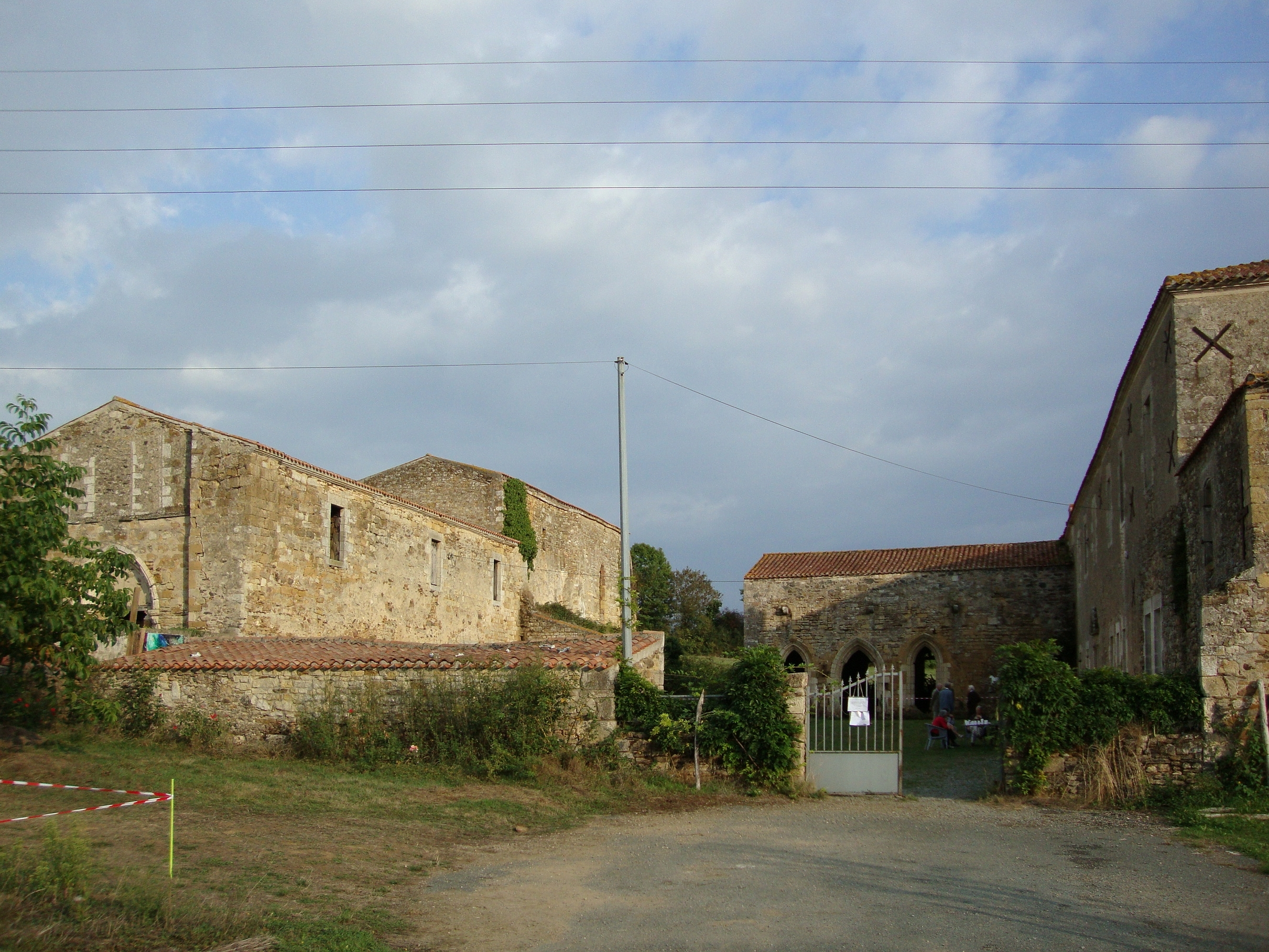
- The Abbey of Trizay, in Bournezeau

- Coat of arms
- Location of Bournezeau
- Location within France Location within Pays de la Loire
- Coordinates: 46°38′11″N 1°10′15″W
- Country: France
- Region: Pays de la Loire
- Department: Vendée
- Arrondissement: La Roche-sur-Yon
- Canton: Chantonnay
- Intercommunality: Pays de Chantonnay

Government
  - Mayor (2020–2026): Louisette Billaudeau
- Area^{1}: 60.49 km^{2} (23.36 sq mi)
- Highest elevation: 104 m (341 ft)
- Lowest elevation: 12 m (39 ft)
- Population (2023): 3,452
  - Density: 57.07/km^{2} (147.8/sq mi)
- Time zone: UTC+01:00 (CET)
  - Summer (DST): UTC+02:00 (CEST)
- INSEE/Postal code: 85034 /85480
- ^{1} French Land Register data, which excludes lakes, ponds, glaciers > 1 km^{2} (0.386 sq mi or 247 acres) and river estuaries.

Bournezeau (French pronunciation: [buʁnəzo]) is a commune in the Vendée department in the Pays de la Loire region in western France.

== Geography ==
The river Lay forms all of the commune's south-eastern border.

== Population ==
Historical population
Year	Pop.	±% p.a.
1968	2,301	—
1975	2,172	−0.82%
1982	2,168	−0.03%
1990	2,336	+0.94%
1999	2,439	+0.48%
2007	2,907	+2.22%
2012	3,206	+1.98%
2017	3,373	+1.02%
2023	3,452	+0.39%
Source: INSEE

== See also ==
- Communes of the Vendée department
