= Boufféré =

- Part of Montaigu-Vendée
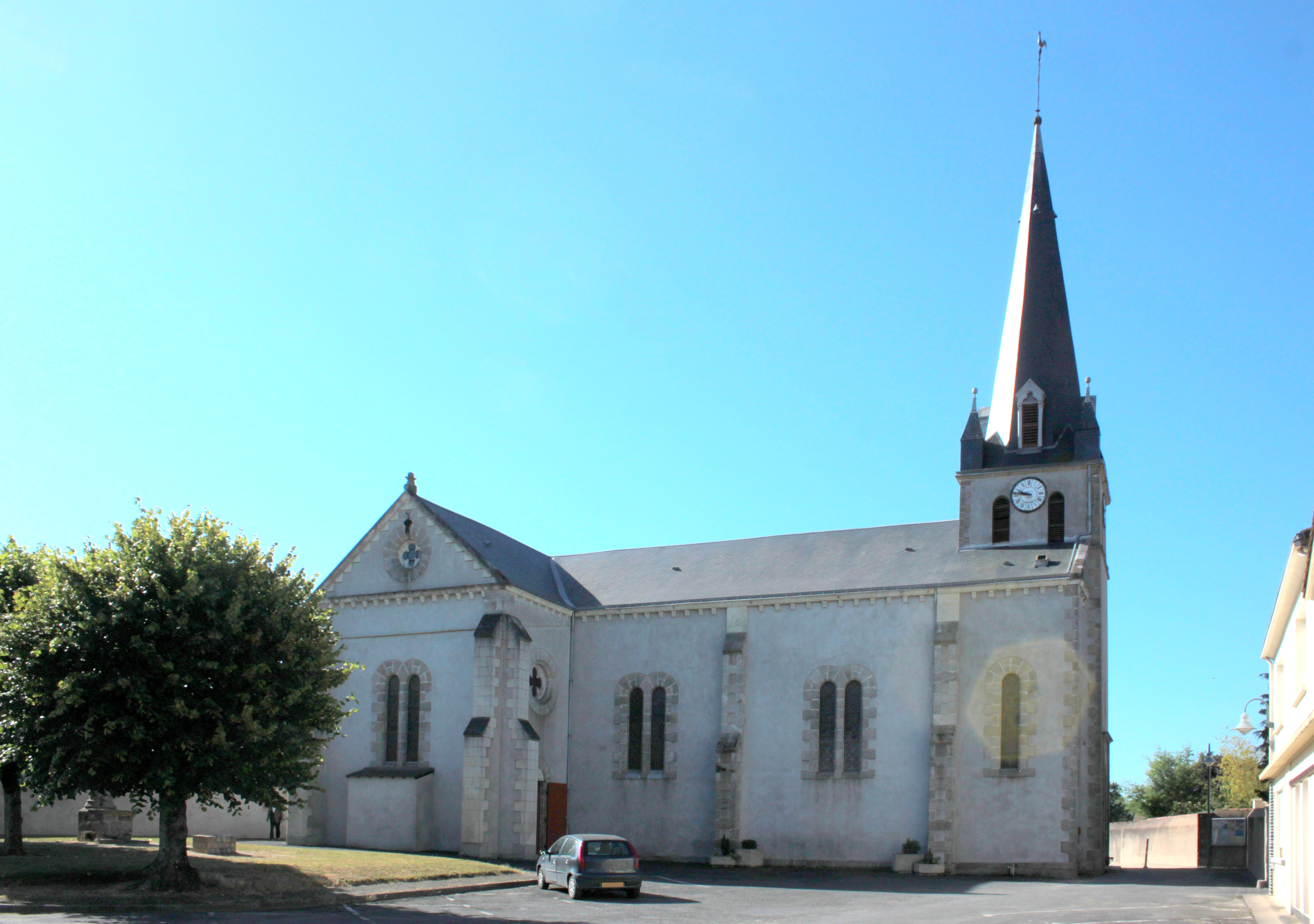
- The church of Our Lady of the Assumption, in Boufféré
- Location of Boufféré
- Location within France Location within Pays de la Loire
- Coordinates: 46°57′44″N 1°20′21″W
- Country: France
- Region: Pays de la Loire
- Department: Vendée
- Arrondissement: La Roche-sur-Yon
- Canton: Montaigu-Vendée
- Commune: Montaigu-Vendée
- Area^{1}: 16.55 km^{2} (6.39 sq mi)
- Highest elevation: 59 m (194 ft)
- Lowest elevation: 13 m (43 ft)
- Population (2022): 3,505
  - Density: 211.8/km^{2} (548.5/sq mi)
- Time zone: UTC+01:00 (CET)
  - Summer (DST): UTC+02:00 (CEST)
- Postal code: 85600
- ^{1} French Land Register data, which excludes lakes, ponds, glaciers > 1 km^{2} (0.386 sq mi or 247 acres) and river estuaries.

Boufféré (French pronunciation: [bufeʁe]) is a former commune in the Vendée department in the Pays de la Loire region in western France. On 1 January 2019, it was merged into the new commune Montaigu-Vendée.

== See also ==
- Communes of the Vendée department
