= Carnet, Manche =

Carnet
- Part of Saint-James
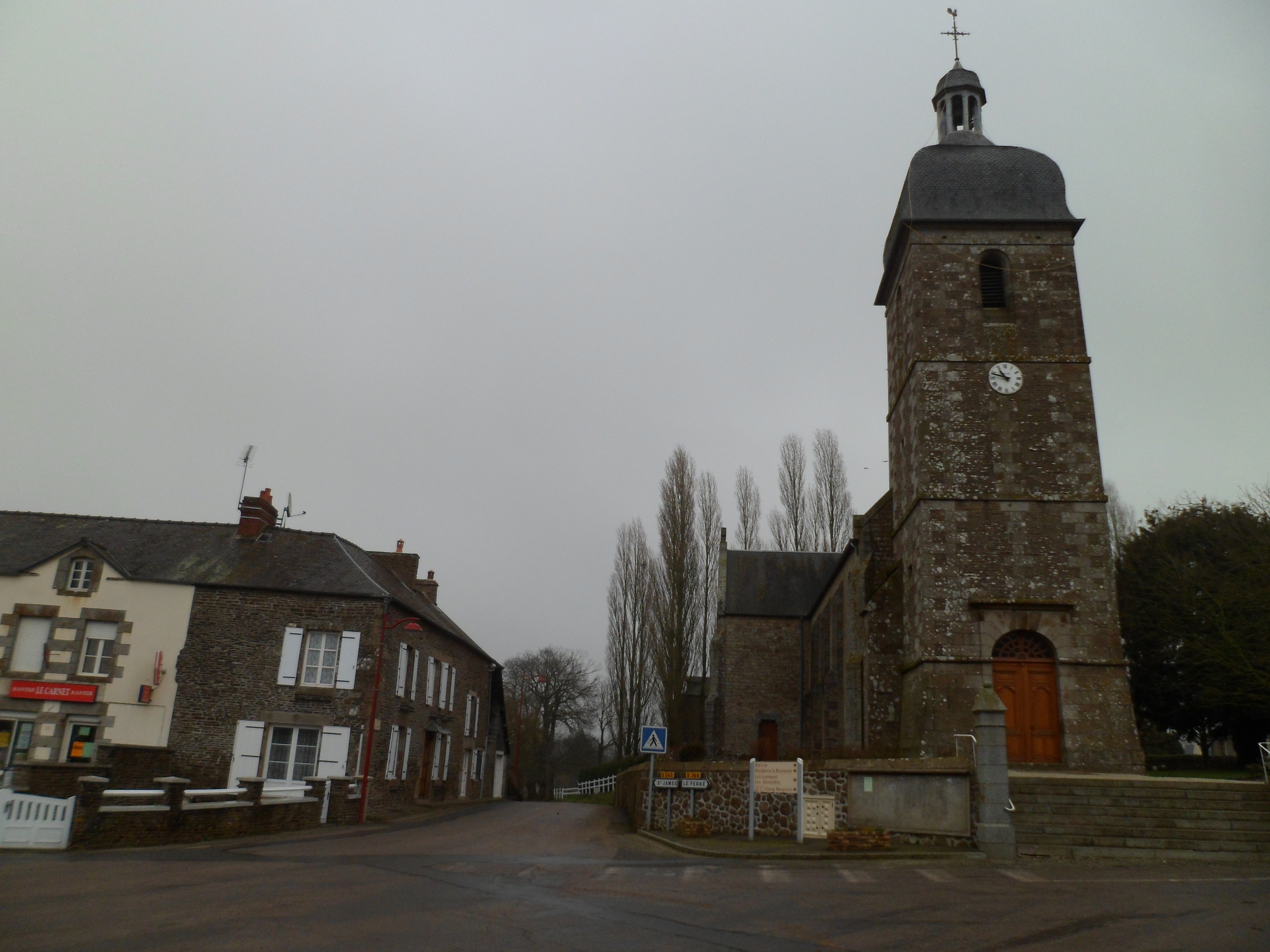
- The church of Notre-Dame
- Location of Carnet
- Location within France Location within Normandy
- Coordinates: 48°30′39″N 1°21′21″W
- Country: France
- Region: Normandy
- Department: Manche
- Arrondissement: Avranches
- Canton: Saint-Hilaire-du-Harcouët
- Commune: Saint-James
- Area^{1}: 10.18 km^{2} (3.93 sq mi)
- Elevation: 85 m (279 ft)
- Highest elevation: 138 m (453 ft)
- Lowest elevation: 40 m (130 ft)
- Population (2022): 471
  - Density: 46.3/km^{2} (120/sq mi)
- Time zone: UTC+01:00 (CET)
  - Summer (DST): UTC+02:00 (CEST)
- Postal code: 50240
- ^{1} French Land Register data, which excludes lakes, ponds, glaciers > 1 km^{2} (0.386 sq mi or 247 acres) and river estuaries.

Carnet (French pronunciation: [kaʁnɛ]) is a former commune in the Manche department in Normandy in north-western France. On 1 January 2017, it was merged into the commune Saint-James.

== See also ==
- Communes of the Manche department
