= Puyravault, Charente-Maritime =

Puyravault
- Commune
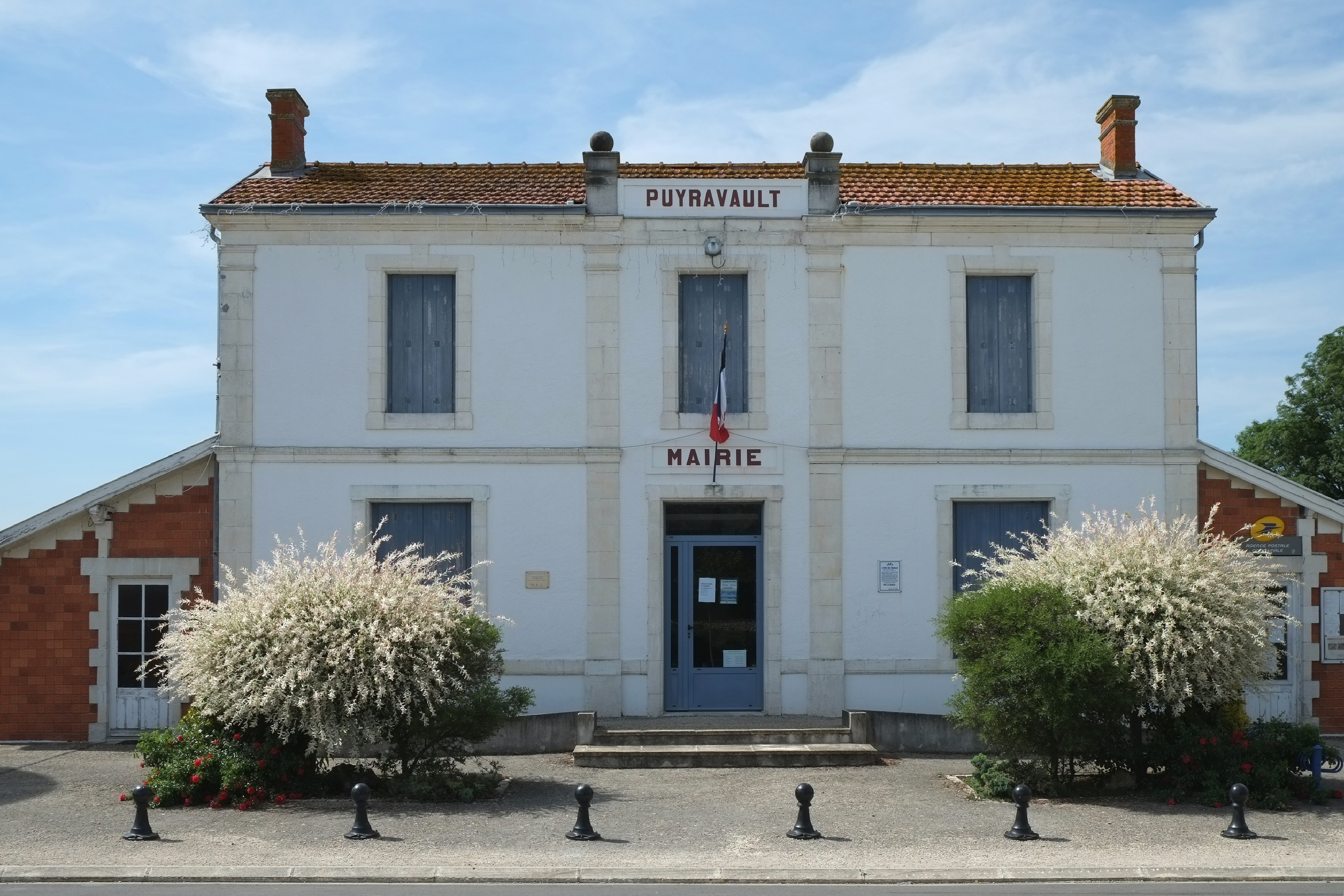
- The town hall in Puyravault
- Location of Puyravault
- Location within France Location within Nouvelle-Aquitaine
- Coordinates: 46°08′03″N 0°48′30″W
- Country: France
- Region: Nouvelle-Aquitaine
- Department: Charente-Maritime
- Arrondissement: Rochefort
- Canton: Surgères

Government
  - Mayor (2020–2026): Raymond Desille
- Area^{1}: 13.68 km^{2} (5.28 sq mi)
- Elevation: 39 m (128 ft)
- Highest elevation: 41 m (135 ft)
- Lowest elevation: 12 m (39 ft)
- Population (2023): 747
  - Density: 54.6/km^{2} (141/sq mi)
- Time zone: UTC+01:00 (CET)
  - Summer (DST): UTC+02:00 (CEST)
- INSEE/Postal code: 17293 /17700
- ^{1} French Land Register data, which excludes lakes, ponds, glaciers > 1 km^{2} (0.386 sq mi or 247 acres) and river estuaries.

Puyravault (French pronunciation: [pɥiʁavo]) is a commune in the Charente-Maritime department in southwestern France.

== Population ==
Historical population
Year	Pop.	±% p.a.
1968	433	—
1975	381	−1.81%
1982	414	+1.19%
1990	406	−0.24%
1999	467	+1.57%
2007	534	+1.69%
2012	630	+3.36%
2017	673	+1.33%
2023	747	+1.75%
Source: INSEE

== See also ==
- Communes of the Charente-Maritime department
