= Vouillé-les-Marais =

- Commune
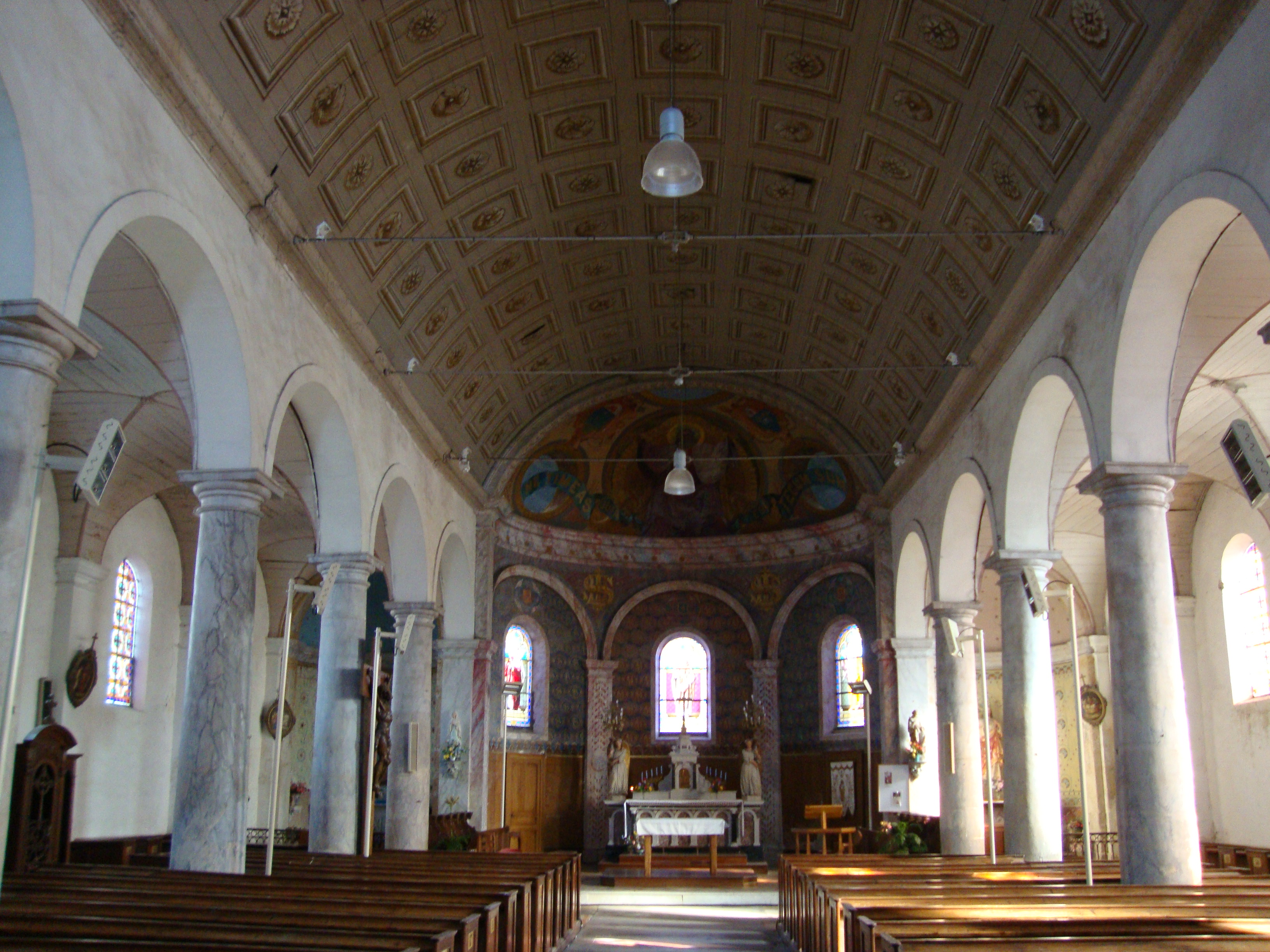
- The interior of the church of Saint-Maxent, in Vouillé-les-Marais
- Location of Vouillé-les-Marais
- Location within France Location within Pays de la Loire
- Coordinates: 46°23′18″N 0°57′45″W
- Country: France
- Region: Pays de la Loire
- Department: Vendée
- Arrondissement: Fontenay-le-Comte
- Canton: Luçon
- Intercommunality: Sud-Vendée-Littoral

Government
  - Mayor (2024–2026): Jacky Mothais
- Area^{1}: 9.14 km^{2} (3.53 sq mi)
- Highest elevation: 12 m (39 ft)
- Lowest elevation: 0 m (0 ft)
- Population (2023): 806
  - Density: 88.2/km^{2} (228/sq mi)
- Time zone: UTC+01:00 (CET)
  - Summer (DST): UTC+02:00 (CEST)
- INSEE/Postal code: 85304 /85450
- ^{1} French Land Register data, which excludes lakes, ponds, glaciers > 1 km^{2} (0.386 sq mi or 247 acres) and river estuaries.

Vouillé-les-Marais (French pronunciation: [vuje le maʁɛ]) is a commune in the Vendée department in the Pays de la Loire region in western France.

== See also ==
- Communes of the Vendée department
