= Sainte-Hermine =

- Part of Saint-Jean-d'Hermine
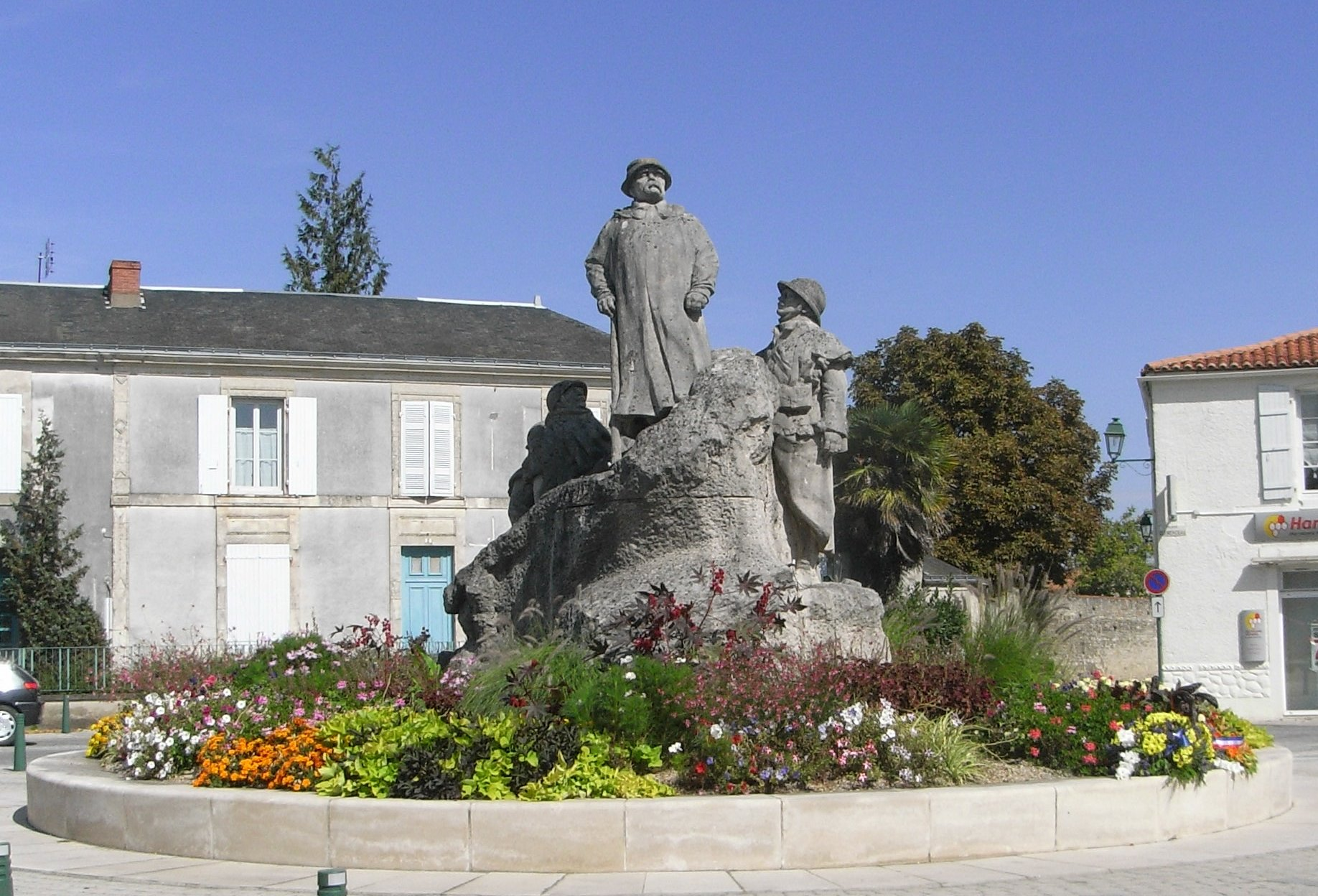
- A statue of Georges Clemenceau, in Sainte-Hermine

- Coat of arms
- Location of Sainte-Hermine
- Location within France Location within Pays de la Loire
- Coordinates: 46°33′25″N 1°03′16″W
- Country: France
- Region: Pays de la Loire
- Department: Vendée
- Arrondissement: Fontenay-le-Comte
- Canton: La Châtaigneraie
- Commune: Saint-Jean-d'Hermine
- Area^{1}: 34.47 km^{2} (13.31 sq mi)
- Highest elevation: 83 m (272 ft)
- Lowest elevation: 12 m (39 ft)
- Population (2022): 2,962
  - Density: 85.93/km^{2} (222.6/sq mi)
- Time zone: UTC+01:00 (CET)
  - Summer (DST): UTC+02:00 (CEST)
- Postal code: 85210
- ^{1} French Land Register data, which excludes lakes, ponds, glaciers > 1 km^{2} (0.386 sq mi or 247 acres) and river estuaries.

Sainte-Hermine (French pronunciation: [sɛ̃t ɛʁmin]) is a former commune in the Vendée department in the Pays de la Loire region in western France. On 1 January 2025, it was merged into the new commune of Saint-Jean-d'Hermine.

== Geography ==
The river Smagne flows southwestward through the commune and crosses the town. The river Lay forms most of the commune's northern border.

== Population ==
Historical population
Year	Pop.	±% p.a.
1968	2,216	—
1975	2,304	+0.56%
1982	2,339	+0.22%
1990	2,285	−0.29%
1999	2,256	−0.14%
2007	2,531	+1.45%
2012	2,839	+2.32%
2017	2,925	+0.60%
Source: INSEE

== See also ==
- Communes of the Vendée department
