= Aunis =

- Flag Coat of arms

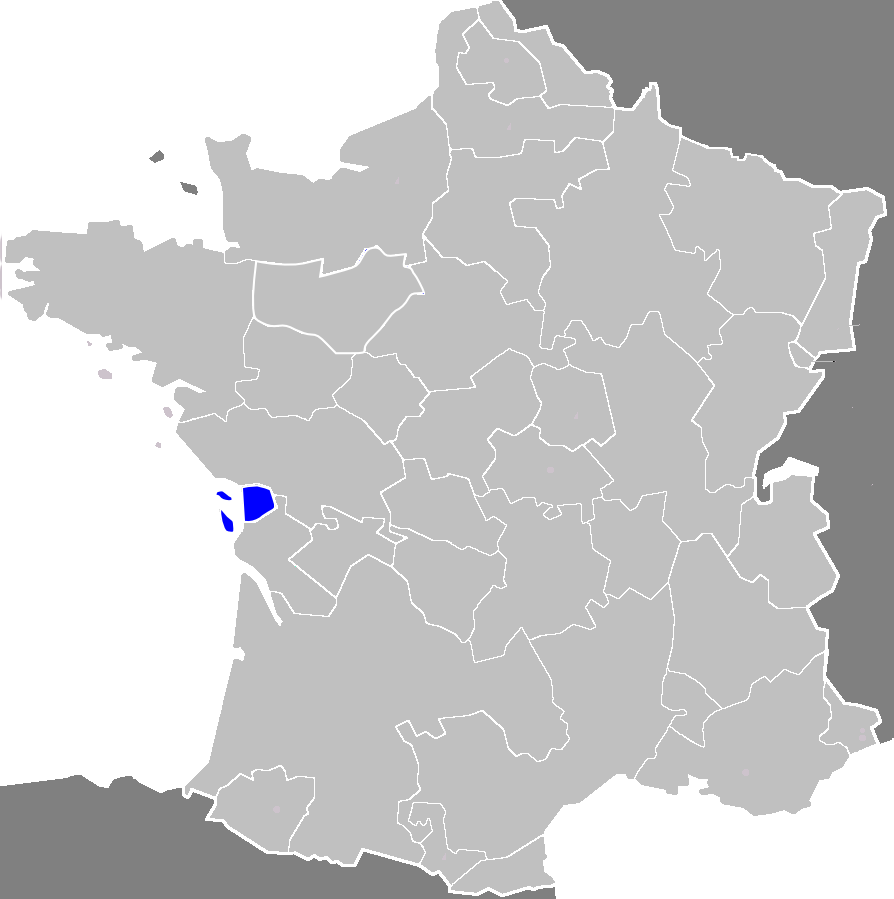
- Aunis in France.
- Coordinates: 46.5°N 0.5°W
- Country: France

Area
  - Land: 1,497.16 km^{2} (578.06 sq mi)

Population (2006) (Note: Source: INSEE. Population sans double comptes.)
  - Total: 286,872
  - Density: 192/km^{2} (500/sq mi)
- Time zone: UTC+1 (CET)
  - Summer (DST): UTC+1 (EDT)

Aunis (French: [onis, oni]) is a historical province of France, situated in the north-west of the department of Charente-Maritime. Its historic capital is La Rochelle, which took over from Castrum Allionis (Châtelaillon) the historic capital which gives its name to the province.

It was a fief of the Duchy of Aquitaine. It extended to Marais Poitevin in the north, Basse Saintonge (and Niortais) in the east, and Rochefortais in the south. Aunis had an influence approximately 20–25 km into the Isle of Ré (l'Île de Ré).

The province was officially recognised during the reign of Charles V of France in 1374: "In 1374, Charles V separated La Rochelle from Saintonge to set up a provincial government, comprising the jurisdictions of Rochefort, Marennes and, for a time, Benon. It was thus that Aunis legally became a separate province."

Aunis was the smallest province in France, in terms of area. Nowadays it is a part of the Charente-Maritime département together with Saintonge.

People from Aunis were called Aunisien (masculine) or Aunisienne (feminine). The English term is Aunisian.

== Geography ==
Aunis is mostly a rolling chalk plain, whose navigable rivers have always been important modes of communication, and from which came economic development and the urbanisation of the region.

The region is coastal, with varied seafronts and offshore islands, from which maritime activities diversified. Nowadays tourism is of great importance.

=== Geographic framework ===
Aunis has two river borders, those of the Sèvre Niortaise in the north, and the Charente in the south. To the west is the Atlantic Ocean and two islands, the Île de Ré and the Île d'Aix. To the east it is bordered by the valley of the Mignon (the main left tributary of the Sèvre Niortaise), by the hills of Saintonge around Saint-Félix, and by the valleys of the Trézence and Boutonne. (Note: The territorial boundaries of Aunis have changed a lot over time. Those described here omit enlargement eastwards; for practical reasons, the borders are "usually" confined to administrative limits of the cantons of Surgères and Tonnay-Charente)

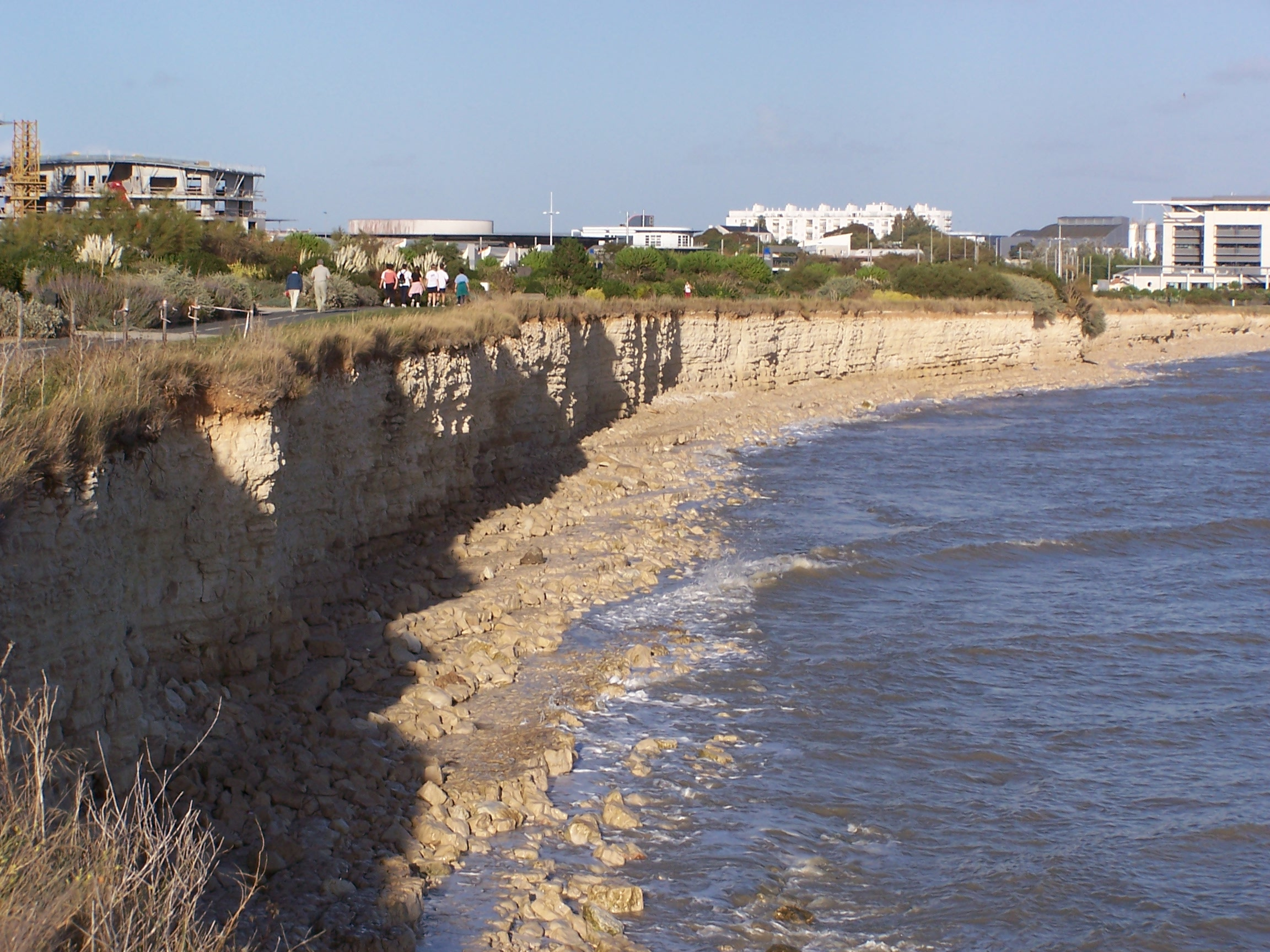
Chalk cliffs to the north and south of La Rochelle date from the Late Jurassic.

Aunis is a chalk plain of the Jurassic period, characterised by gently rolling hills, where no valley is completely enclosed, and where the land has a regular descent towards the sea. The islands of Ré and Aix were made at the same time and from the same type of rock. The chalk table completes the triangular promontory which juts into the Atlantic, forming the northern extremity of the Aquitaine Basin.

Large freshwater and seawater marshes have formed in places that have been drained, hardly altering the general relief. The seawater marshes correspond to ancient marine gulfs, made from marine or fluvial sediments. Since the Middle Ages they have been continuously drained by people. In the north, the Marais Poitevin dries up, at the centre there are the valleys of the small river Curé and its main tributary the Virson and in the east the valley of the Mignon. In the south is the marshland of "Little Flanders" (French: la Petite Flandre), drained since the 17th century. Together these constitute an important reservoir of fresh water, essential for the agricultural and snail-farming activities of the north of the department.

=== Transport ===
The geography of the plain was always very unfavourable for communications. The region was almost an enclave, and for a long time on the margins of the French kingdom politically as well as geographically. (Note: This regional enclave was even more isolated by the marshes (marais) – Marais Poitevin, Marais de Rochefort – which were for much of history obstacles for overland travel)

Huge efforts were made to break this geographical isolation. Without doubt the most spectacular was the coming of the railway in 1857, running from La Rochelle and Rochefort to Paris. This line has been repeatedly modernised (made double track, and electrified in 1993 for use by the TGV).

The regional railways connecting Nantes to Bordeaux also serve Aunis, passing through La Rochelle, Châtelaillon-Plage and Rochefort.

Roads have also been considerably modernised, notably the roads from La Rochelle to Rochefort, from La Rochelle to Niort, the A837 autoroute from Rochefort to Saintes, the viaduct over the Charente at Rochefort, the ring road around La Rochelle, and the bridge to the Île de Ré, all of which are now dual carriageways.

The modernisation of communication infrastructure had its heyday in the second half of the 19th century, at the end of the Second French Empire, and economic activity diversified.

=== Agricultural and maritime activities ===
The two principal agricultural resources are intensive arable farming (wheat, maize, oil seed) and livestock farming. Dairy cows have long been the mainstay, but more and more cows and bulls are raised for beef (principally in the marshy areas).

Vineyards were virtually abandoned after phylloxera wiped them out in 1876, although there are still some on the Île de Ré.

At sea, between the estuary of the Sèvre Niortaise and the north of La Rochelle, mussel farming (mytiliculture) has an important place, while Fouras and the Marais d'Yves Nature Reserve are the main centres for oyster farming. La Rochelle keeps its place as a fishing port thanks to its modern port of Chef-de-Baie, but even so fishing is in decline. (Note: The port of La Rochelle is no longer practically used for industrial-scale fishing, but was ranked the 4th largest French fishing port in the early 1970s. Nowadays it is the second fishing port of the Charente-Maritime department, behind Cotinière, on the Île d'Oléron)

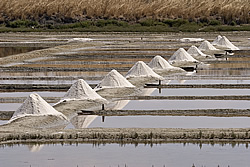
The salt marshes and l'or blanc ("White Gold") salt are important natural resources of the Île de Ré

Reclamation of sea salt from the marshes of Aunis brought the region its riches in the Middle Ages, but this has now completely disappeared from the coast of mainland Aunis. However, it still takes place on the Île de Ré and notably on the nearby Île d'Ars, and has lately achieved a certain notability for its small-volume craft production and minimal postprocessing.

In the north-east of Aunis there is a huge forest of hardwood trees, the Forest of Benon, which has been protected because it is unique to the region. With an area of 3,300 hectares (8,200 acres), it is the Aunisiens' "green belt".

=== Industrial diversification ===
- La Rochelle Chamber of Commerce
- Rochefort and Saintonge Chamber of Commerce and Industry

Aunis does not have the strong industrial tradition which is the trademark of regions of the North and of Lorraine, and it was only at the end of the 19th century that factories started to be developed. After World War II, industry in Aunis continued, was reinforced, diversified and brought up-to-date.

Three industrial hubs emerged in Aunis to bring together the industries of Charente-Maritime:

- La Rochelle specialised in railway construction (Alstom) and naval construction (Chantiers navals Gamelin), motor parts (Delphi Corporation), food industries (Senoble), chemicals and pharmaceuticals (Rhodia) and pleasure boats (Dufour, Fontaine-Pajot). It is by far the largest hub of the department. It is also a large commercial port, the eighth largest in all France. In 2007 it was granted the status of port autonome ("self-governing port").
- Rochefort and Tonnay-Charente developed port activities on the river Charente. The two towns have diverse industrial activities with aerospace (EADS, Simair), automotive industry, ferrous and non-ferrous metals, chemical and plastics industries, pleasure boating, among them. The industrial area of Rochefort-Tonnay-Charente is the second hub of the department.
- Surgères has become a hub for the food industry, augmented by metallurgical and plastic industries.

In addition there are two smaller, newer industrial areas: Aigrefeuille-d'Aunis and Marans, Charente-Maritime.

=== Tourism ===
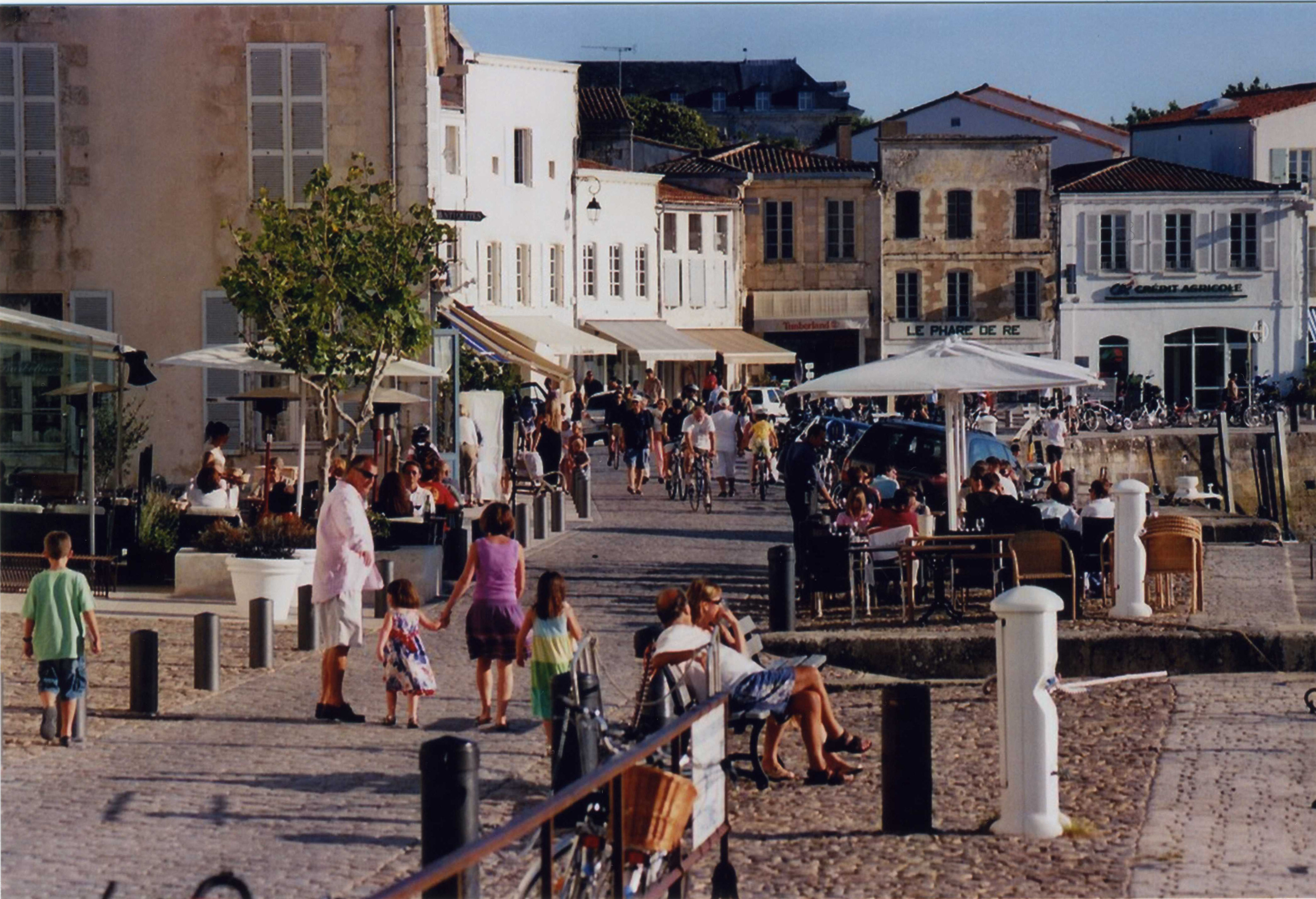
Quays at Saint-Martin-de-Ré

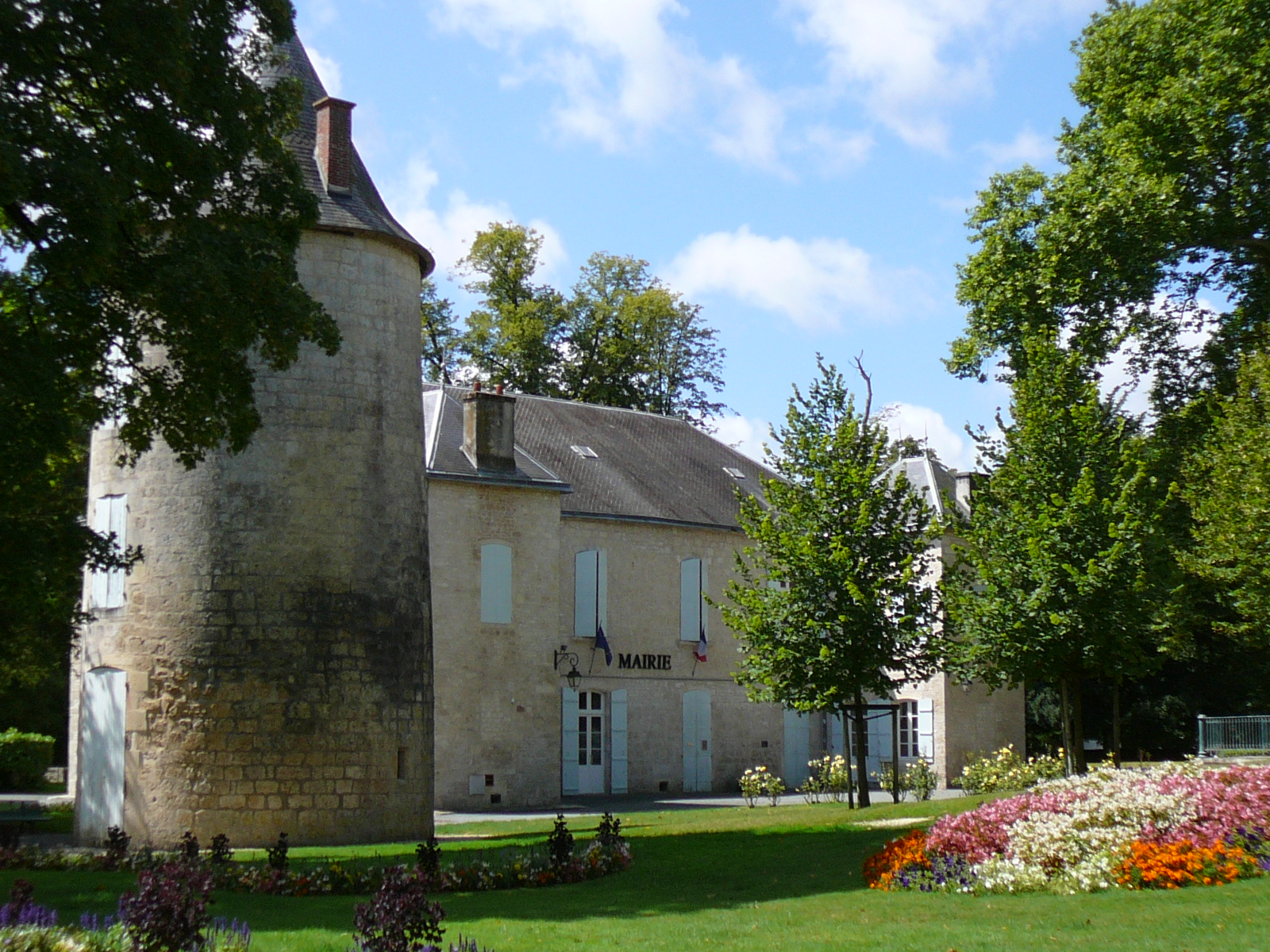
Surgères castle, now the town hall

Thanks to the sea, Aunis developed its tourist potential which, in the late 19th century, came to the fore with the trend for sea bathing. Bathing beaches such as Châtelaillon-Plage and Fouras gained notability, while the larger beaches such as those of the Île de Ré became national treasures from the 1960s. The Pertuis d'Antioche, which is effectively an inland sea, was popular for pleasure boating in the 1970s. La Rochelle, with its immense Port des Minimes, can hold 5,000 pleasure boats, and has become the largest pleasure boating port on the French Atlantic. Ars-en-Ré, La Flotte and Saint-Martin-de-Ré are also well-known pleasure ports, while the river ports of Marans on the Sèvre niortaise, and Rochefort, on the Charente, had disused port basins that have become home to pleasure boats, and can each take more than 200 craft.

The Île de Ré lives totally by tourism and can accommodate up to 250,000 tourists during the summer season. This "invasion" is even more pronounced on the Île d'Aix which accommodates up to 180,000 tourists each year, even though it does not have a car bridge.

Aunis has also developed its cultural and urban tourism with its two great historical towns of La Rochelle and Rochefort. The small towns of the interior are not without interest and have enhanced their heritage sites, like Surgères (Notre-Dame church, castle, renovated town centre) and Marans (port and river site), Tonnay-Charente (management of Charente quays). Aunis has made huge efforts to put in place green tourism and has developed, notably at Aigrefeuille-d'Aunis, quality tourist bases (lac de Frace, tourist complex of La Taillée).

== Demography ==
In 2006 the region had 286,872 inhabitants, (Note: That is, the urban area of La Rochelle and the "rural" areas of the Île de Ré, Aunis and Rochefortais) nearly half the total population of Charente-Maritime (47.9%).

In 2010, the northwest of the department had ten of the seventeen towns of over 5,000 inhabitants, and 31 of the department's 60 communes of over 2,000 inhabitants.

The region covers 1,497.16 km^{2} (578.06 sq mi), 21.8% of the whole department.

The population density of the region is more than twice that of the departmental average: 192/km^{2} (500/sq mi), compared to 87/km^{2} (230/sq mi) for Charente-Maritime as a whole. It is nearly thrice that of the Poitou-Charentes region at 67/km^{2} (170/sq mi) and is higher than the national average, which in 2006 was 113/km^{2} (290/sq mi).

The ratio of urban to rural population is comparable to the national average, which is 3:4. This is considerably different from Charente-Maritime as a whole, where the ratio is nearer 3:5.

The region became considerably more urban after World War II, though the population is unevenly distributed. Above all, the Aunis coastal towns have expanded to provide the larger part of employment and leisure.

La Rochelle and Rochefort are the most populous urban areas not just in Aunis but in all Charente-Maritime. The two towns are becoming twin cities with many suburbs, connected by regular railway trains. This heavily built-up area is now home to over 200,000 inhabitants (201,509 inhabitants in 2006). (Note: La Rochelle contributing 146,121 and Rochefort 55,388) This urban area is second in the region after the "Clain corridor", which runs between Poitiers and Châtellerault. Near the coast the towns have formed a dense urban web and the population density is particularly high: 288/km^{2} (750/sq mi) in the three cantons of Rochefort, (Note: The cantons of Rochefort Centre, North and South – 2006 census (municipal population)) 686/km^{2} (1,780/sq mi) in the canton of Aytré, (Note: This canton combines the communes of Angoulins-sur-Mer, Châtelaillon-Plage and Aytré – 2006 census (municipal population)) 919/km^{2} (2,380/sq mi) in the combined cantons of La Rochelle. (Note: La Rochelle cantons 1 – 9 and the canton of Aytré – 2006 census (municipal population)) The La Rochelle-Rochefort twin city area alone includes nine towns of the seventeen with more than 5,000 inhabitants, and twenty communes with more than 2,000 inhabitants, of the sixty in Charente-Maritime in 2006.

The concentration of the population is even greater in the immediate neighbours of La Rochelle, where the canton of La Jarrie had a population density of 149/km^{2} (390/sq mi) in 2006. (Note: In the community of communes of the Aunis Plain, where the small towns of Aigrefeuille-d'Aunis and La Jarrie are found, the density is nearly 100/km^{2} (260/sq mi) (98/km^{2} (250/sq mi) in 2006))

Beyond the La Rochelle-Rochefort twin city area, the population density is lower, and is indeed lower than the departmental average, which was 87/km^{2} (230/sq mi) in 2006. The cantons of Aigrefeuille-d'Aunis, Surgères and Marans had respectively 70/km^{2} (180/sq mi), 62/km^{2} (160/sq mi) and 62/km^{2} (160/sq mi). Only the Canton of Courçon had a density of less than 50/km^{2} (130/sq mi) (46/km^{2} (120/sq mi) in 2006), even though its population surged between 1999 and 2006 by 28.4%. The Pays d'Aunis, an administrative region comprising four communes (Courçon, Pays Marandais, Plaine d'Aunis and Surgères), returned a census in 2006 of 61,058 inhabitants in an area of 939 square kilometres (363 sq mi), giving a density of 65/km^{2} (170/sq mi). It is still a mostly rural region, but is rapidly becoming more built-up.

Urbanisation has been just as fast on the Île de Ré, especially in the east. In the Canton of Saint-Martin-de-Ré all the communes have over 2,000 inhabitants, and the population density is one of the highest of the entire department, at 299/km^{2} (770/sq mi) in 2006 compared to 87/km^{2} (230/sq mi) for the whole department and 242/km^{2} (630/sq mi) for the urban area of La Rochelle. In 2006 the population density of the Île de Ré was the highest of the entire French coast, being a record high of 207/km^{2} (540/sq mi).

The principal towns of Aunis are: (Note: For this purpose is meant the administrative area of La Rochelle and the "rural" areas of the Île de Ré, of Pays d'Aunis and of Rochefortais)

- La Rochelle with 77,196 inhabitants is by far the most populous town in the Charente-Maritime department. Including its suburbs its population is nearly 120,000, and in the Poitou-Charentes region it is second only to Poitiers.
- Rochefort is the third town of Charente-Maritime, after La Rochelle and Saintes, (Note: Saintes returned 26,531 inhabitants at the 2006 census and remained second in Charente-Maritime (municipal population)) but together with Tonnay-Charente it is the second largest urban area in the department with 37,095 inhabitants, making it equal fifth in the Poitou-Charentes region. (Note: In 2006 Châtellerault was the sixth largest urban area in the region. With the neighbouring commune of Cenon-sur-Vienne, it had a combined urban population of 36,422 inhabitants in 2006.)
- Surgères with 5,982 inhabitants, is the twelfth largest town in Charente-Maritime. (Note: In 2006, Surgères was one of the 17 towns in Charente-Maritime having over 5,000 inhabitants, of which the ten largest are (in order of municipal population) La Rochelle (1), Saintes (2), Rochefort (3), Royan (4), Aytré (5), Saint-Jean-d'Angély (6), Lagord (7), Tonnay-Charente (8), Périgny (9), Saujon (10))
- Marans, with 4,654 inhabitants, is the largest commune in the department by area, at 82.49 km^{2} (31.85 mi^{2}). It is nearly as large as the whole of the Île de Ré at 85.32 km^{2} (32.94 mi^{2}).

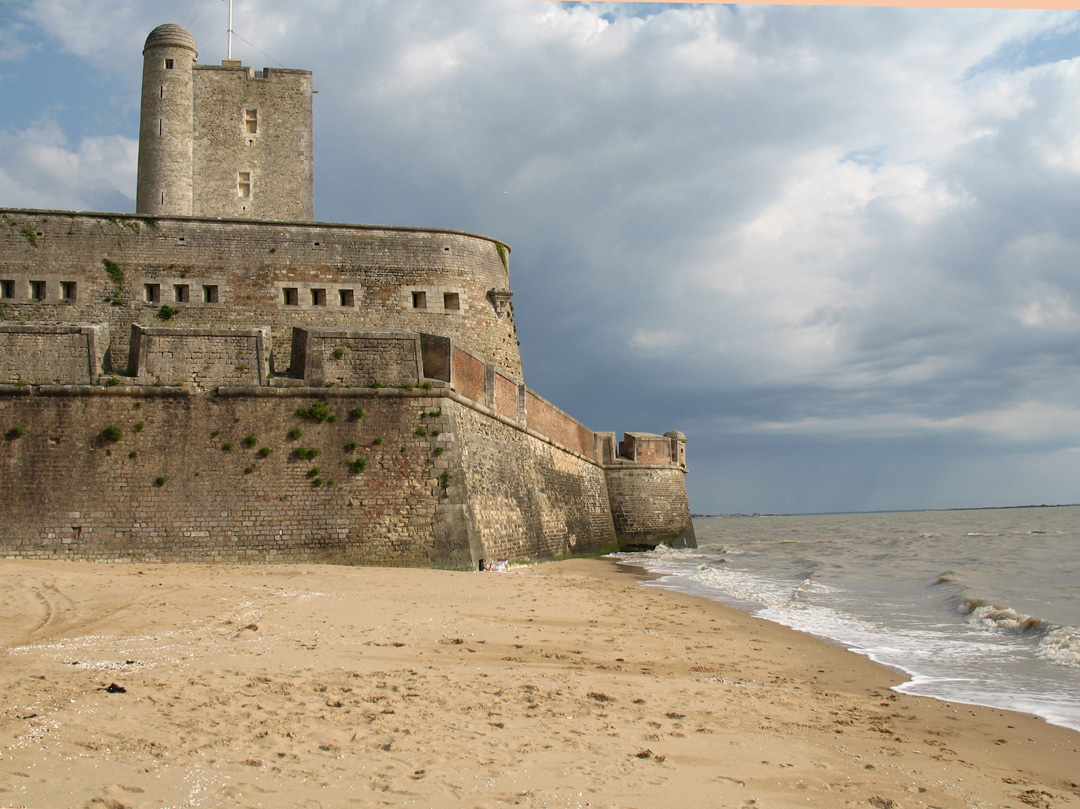
Vauban à Fouras fort has become a vibrant small seaside resort

- Fouras regenerated into a vibrant small seaside resort in the 1990s. The town now has about 4,000 inhabitants. (Note: It had 4,121 inhabitants in the 1962 census, its largest ever and a record still not surpassed)
- Aigrefeuille d'Aunis, with 3,523 inhabitants, leads the Communauté de communes Plaine d'Aunis which, with 20,987 inhabitants, is the most populated of the Pays d'Aunis. (Note: Do not confuse the territories of the Pays d'Aunis with those of the historical province of Aunis. The Pays d'Aunis groups together the four 4 "communautés de communes" of Courçon, Marans, Plaine d'Aunis and Surgères, whereas the historical province of Aunis, the subject of this article, constitutes all the north-west of the departement of Charente-Maritime, thus including La Rochelle, the Île de Ré, and Rochefort.)
- On the Île de Ré, Saint-Martin-de-Ré and La Flotte make up a small urban area with 5,504 inhabitants, but Sainte-Marie-de-Ré is the most populous single commune, with 3,027 inhabitants.

== Toponymy ==
The name of the province appears for the first time in history in 785 AD. Following the partition of Aquitaine into nine counties, as decreed by Charlemagne in 778, the name of Aunis, written as Latin: Pagus Alnensis, appeared in the last will and testament of Count Roger.

But the etymology of the name has been given many different interpretations and folk etymologies that are still used today. Even so, some people think "The most probable origin is that the town of Aulnay (Aulnay en Saintongeais), which was more important in the Middle Ages than it is today. Aulnay marked the frontier between Santones and Pictones. Little by little the province shrank until the frontier was situated a long way from Aulnay. It is the smallest province in France". This interpretation does not pass muster, because there is absolutely no connection between the original names of Aulnay which, in Latin, were written Odenaco (in 951) or Audeniaco (in 970), so that Aunis, with its older name as seen above, was written Pagus Alensis or instead Pagus Alienensis. Even now, there is no consensus among historians and etymologists.

Etymologists have proposed three possible interpretations which deserve consideration:

- the name should be linked to the forest, because the French: aulne (English: Alder) was very common in mediaeval times; the province became the French: pays des aulnes ("Alder Region").
- the etymology must be interpreted as being cognate with that of an ancient barbaric people. According to some historians, Aunis was populated by a tribe of Alani, who invaded Gaul in 406 AD. Delayant in his time described the idea that the Alani would have settled in Aunis: "Their attacks were at first aimed at looting rather than conquest. The Vandals had merely passed through. We must think of their stragglers. Some of them, turned back by the Visigoths, hid (so it is said) in this refuge between Sèvre and the Charente, and their name furnished one of numerous etymologies that have been given to the word Aunis."
- the name of Aunis is related to the eventful history of the town of Châtelaillon in mediaeval times. The first capital of Aunis was in practice Châtelaillon (today Châtelaillon-Plage), designated by its Latin name Castrum Allionis heard as French: château d'Aunis, English: Aunis castle. This last theory has found favour with a large number of historians.

== History ==
In ancient times the region was a long way from civilisation. It was not until the Middle Ages that the province entered history, when La Rochelle sealed its fate and became its capital.

=== The "pays des aulnes" in antiquity ===
In Celtic and Gallo-Roman times, the northern part of Santonie, (Note: Latin: Pagus Santonum, "Santone Country") which became called "Aunis", was a long-neglected region far from civilisation, with no communications.

The old "Forest of Argenson" covered the entire region. For many centuries this large forest made a near-impenetrable natural frontier stretching from the Boutonne and Charente to the east, which kept it apart from the ancient province of the Pictones. This was the pays des aulnes (English: Alder Region), where the trees had established themselves on riverbanks and in the marshy valleys, and where beeches and oaks also formed a dense forest that was associated with superstition. (Note: Some of these feelings and superstitions are still around)

Moreover, the deep sea gulfs (Gulf of Pictones, to the north, Gulf of Santones, to the south) made it a slender peninsula. Its seclusion lent its name as Pagus Santonum, now Saintonge. This geographic isolation made communications and trade very poor. One can see from a road map of Gallo-Roman times, Aunis is entirely absent. The old Roman road which ran from Mediolanum Santonum (now the town of Saintes) to Juliomagus (now the town of Angers) was routed entirely to the east of Aunis. The name of this Roman road remains in some modern place names as La Chaussée de Saint-Félix ("St Felix's Way") and La Chaussée de Marsais ("Marshland Way"): this is Route départmentale D.120, which runs from Saint-Jean-d'Angély until the department's border with Deux-Sèvres. This Roman road is found in the "Table de Peutinger", where again no Roman road goes into Aunis.

Finally, the valleys of the rivers Curé, Virson, Mignon, and Gères, which were much larger than today, cut deeply through the region's invading forest. But they had the inconvenience of being marshy and prone to floods that turned them into real marshes and bogs, making the region particularly difficult to reach.

All these natural phenomena combined, so that it has been said "this region [...], often flooded and marshy, has its riches, is easy to defend, but cannot become the fulcrum for an attack".

The coast was occupied by the Celts, even during the time of Pagus Santonum – they preferred to call the area Saintonge and themselves Santones – and then the Romans in the 1st century BC. Saintonge offered better living and working conditions than the northern area (Aunis) thanks to the large valleys of the river Charente and its two principal tributaries, the Seugne and the Boutonne. The huge Gironde Estuary of the Seudre allowed direct contact with the more advanced civilisation of the Roman Empire to the south, via the Garonne valley. Transport was largely on the waterways, even after the Romans had built their more advanced – and more expensive – roads.

Before the Roman conquest around the middle of the 1st century AD, the Celts had a stronghold over the northern shores of the Gulf of Santones. They had even colonised some of the islands in the gulf, which today are part of the Marais (English: marsh) de Rochefort. (Note: These comprise the marsh of "la Petite Flandre", drained in the 17th century) The Santones had worked laboriously to perfect a technique of saltwater extraction, and their ancient production sites were put right on the shoreline. These are sites à sel ("salt sites"). (Note: Thanks to archaeology, dozens of sites à sel have been found along the ancient shoreline of Aunis, mainly in the area that is now the Marais de Rochefort) These small-scale production sites were particularly numerous in the north of the Gulf of Santones, equally along the coastline, in the deep estuaries, and all around the islands (notably the Île d'Albe). (Note: Commune of Muron)

The salt sites were quickly abandoned after the Roman conquest, because the new colonists brought with them a better-performing and more-productive technique for producing salt. Nevertheless, the Romans preferred to have their first salt marshes in the south, notably at Marennes, and on the banks of the river Seudre. Salt production, which before had been driven by profit, could be done faster around the Gironde, (Note: where the great port of Portus Santonum lies) which became an important arterial river for the transport of goods to and from the southern provinces of the Roman Empire.

During the first three centuries of the Gallo-Roman period, the Romans were especially keen to colonise the area between the coastline of Aunis and the ancient sylve d'Argenson ("Forest of Argenson"), taking lands latterly in Santone hands. The new colonists, somewhat turning their backs to the sea, set up their villae – large farms of some dozens of acres, predating the towns themselves – at Ardillières, Le Thou, Ballon, and Thairé. All these sites left numerous archaeological finds: at Ballon, the remains of a Gallo-Roman villa have been found; at Ardillières, tombs with Gallo-Roman objects have been recovered; at Thou, a Gallo-Roman villa and some coins were discovered in the 19th century.

However, near the end of the 3rd century AD, the Pagus Santonum entered a new age of prosperity, and its northern part was just as prosperous, after it was integrated into Aquitaine. The Romans also had interests in the "Pays des Aulnes" and had started to clear the Forest of Argenson on its eastern border. During the 1st century AD they had built the Roman road connecting Mediolanum Santonum (Saintes) to Juliomagus (Angers) but it passed Aunis by, so clearings were opened into this vast forest, notably at Vouhé. Here remains of a Gallo-Roman villa have been restored, together with many fragmentary finds. At Saint-Georges-du-Bois, previously Argenton, the Romans built a small amphitheatre.

In the 4th century AD the Romans decided to clear the Forest of Argenson along the southern shores of the Gulf of Pictones, which had been occupied by Celts since ancient times. The present Forest of Benon is in this area, where the Romans also established villae, whose names still linger on, such as that of the Gallo-Roman site Breuil-Bertin in the commune of Saint-Ouen-d'Aunis., or the old Nobiliaco – nowadays the commune of Nuaillé-d'Aunis, or indeed that of Villa Liguriaco at Saint-Sauveur-d'Aunis.

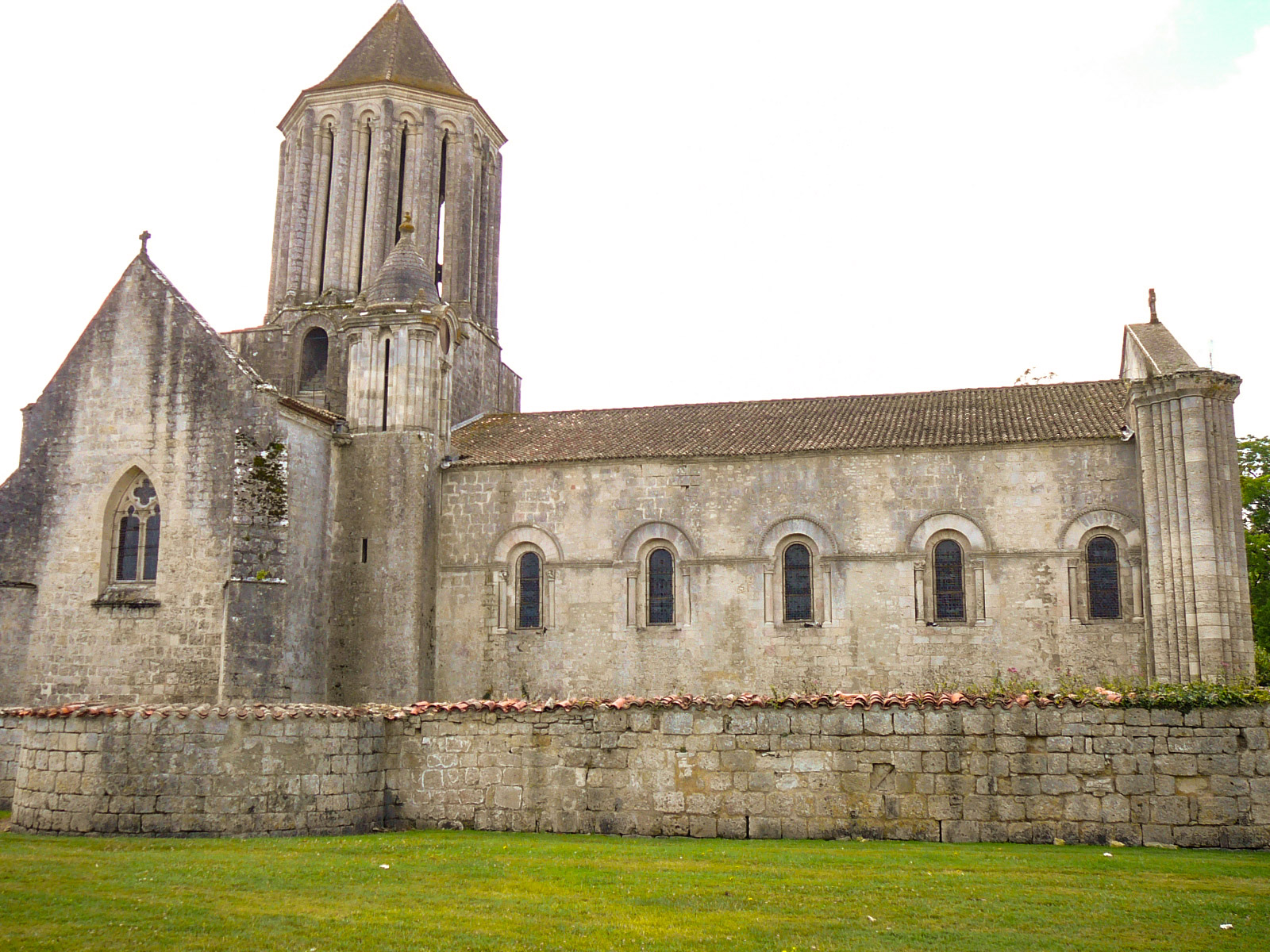
The church of Notre-Dame at Surgères

These attempts at deforestation and colonisation did succeed, albeit belatedly, but came to a halt with the invasions of the 5th century AD. So, the "barbarous" people (Note: A term used by the Romans to refer to anyone outside the Empire's borders; here it means the invaders of Gaul) sealed the fall of the western Roman Empire, with pillage and destruction from which Santonie did not escape. The province was then occupied by the Visigoths from the start of the 5th century AD, and then by the Franks, who took over after their victory in Vouillé in 507 AD.

=== The "pagus alnensis" in the Middle Ages ===
Aunis was once again neglected throughout the Middle Ages, "ignoring" the barbarians who had, after all, appropriated the great Roman roads during their invasions. From the time the Franks settled in the 6th century to the Carolingian dynasty in the 9th power in the province was unstable and autarchic. (Note: Records relating to this time in Aunis are very rare, and so is archaeology, which goes to show the complete isolation of Aunis at this time)

It was under Carolingian rule that Saintonge truly entered recorded history.

Its name, Pagus Alnensis, appears for the first time in 785. It was under the control of the Counts of Poitou. Towards the end of the 10th century, after Carolingian power collapsed, Aunis separated from Saintonge and had its first capital, Châtelaillon.

In the 9th and 10th centuries the Counts of Poitou hastened to fortify the Aunis coast. They built the four-tower fortress at Châtelaillon as their stronghold to deal with the Viking threat. But repeated Norman incursions into the interior, reached by river and stream, caused great insecurity. So in the 9th century the Duke of Poitou built the fortified city of Surgères, also called the castrum of Benon, with "a tower that stood in the middle of a square, encircled by two paths and three moats".

At the end of the 11th century, the Counts of Poitou started to pay attention to the forsaken backwaters of the region, and made them a priority. Above all, they encouraged powerful abbeys to be founded after clearing the Forest of Argenson. Grâce-Dieu (English: God's Grace) Abbey was built in Benon, being the first Cistercian abbey to be founded in Aunis, and an active participant in the forest clearing movement. The clearings opened the way into the ancient forest to set up villages and farming (wheat, oats, barley) and to plant vines. The powerful monasteries, backed up by the lords, helped with the clearings of Aunis in the 11th century. But it is mostly during the 12th and 13th centuries that these earthworks were completed; much later that they became the "plain" of Aunis.

On the coast, the salt waters had become amenable and created Aunis's wealth, and by the end of the 11th century its prosperity was assured. Châtelaillon rapidly became the largest fortified city in Aunis and an important port for the transport of salt from Aunis, and wine from Saintonge.

After the demise of Châtelaillon in 1130, La Rochelle quickly rose to prominence and became the new capital of Aunis: "The demise of Châtelaillon dates to 1130, but it was only in 1144 that Alon family control was removed. A party assembled at Mauléon, the nearest island to Aunis, and they built the new town of La Rochelle there starting in 1151".

The province was thus controlled in 1130 by William X, Duke of Aquitaine, bringing the dowry of Eleanor of Aquitaine to Louis VII of France, then, after their divorce and her remarriage, to King Henry II of England. Aunis was returned to the French with Louis VIII of France in 1224, but was restored by the Treaty of Brittany in 1360 by John II of France. This yoke was shaken off in 1371, and the province restored to King Charles V of France.

=== Birth of the province ===
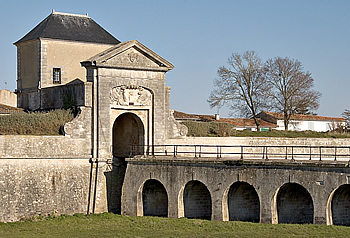
The Vauban defensive wall in Saint-Martin-de-Ré

In 1374 the King officially separated Saintonge in 1374 and set up Aunis: "In 1374, Charles V separated La Rochelle from Saintonge to set up a provincial government, comprising the jurisdictions of Rochefort, Marennes and, for a time, Benon. It was thus that Aunis legally became a separate province."

The province was much larger in mediaeval times, and underwent numerous changes to its borders. It extended from the Marais Poitevin in the north, to the lower valley of the Charente in the south; to the west, it included the islands of Île de Ré and the Île d'Aix, at the mouth of the Charente. However, in the east the borders were often ill-defined and subject to change. It is likely that Aunis extended to the ports of Niort and also included the viguerie of Saint-Jean d'Angély. With the official establishment of the province in 1374, during the reign of Charles V of France, Aunis recovered Rochefort and Marennes, but its eastern boundaries were still vague.

=== During the Reformation ===
The Protestant Reformation, started in the time of Francis I of France, gave Aunis much greater power: it was the last stand of the resistance movement, which survived until La Rochelle fell in 1628.

=== End of the Ancien Régime ===
When the départements were established under the French Constitution of 1791, Aunis was a very small province both in area and population. Despite the resistance of its inhabitants and the energetic interventions of its leaders, in 1790 it was coalesced with the much larger region of Saintonge to form the Department of Charente-Maritime. (Note: From its creation in 1790 until 1941, the department was named Charente-Inférieure because it was at the downstream end of the river Charente; the neighbouring Department of Charente was farther upstream and so called Haute Charente)

== Quote ==
L'aultre partie, cependent, tirera vers Onys, Sanctonge, Angomoys et Gascoigne, ensemble Perigot, Medoc et Elanes. Sans resistence prendront villes, chasteaux et forteresses.

— François Rabelais, Gargantua and Pantagruel, Chapter 33 (Picrochole's advisers)

The other party, meanwhile, will head for Aunis, Saintonge, Angoumois and Gascony, together with Périgord, Médoc and Elanes. They will take towns, castles and fortresses without resistance.

== Places of interest ==
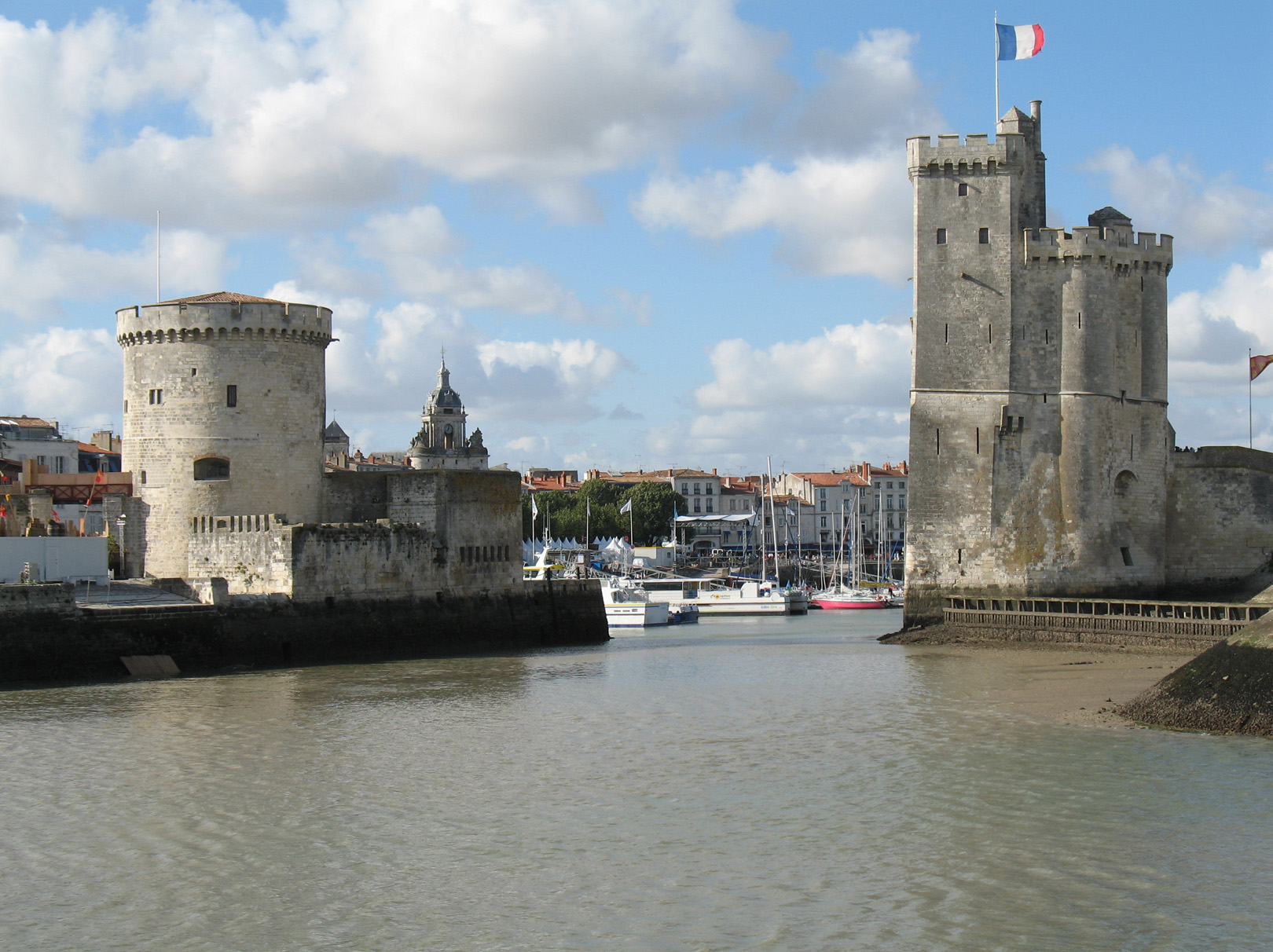
The entrance of the Old Port of La Rochelle

In La Rochelle:

- The Saint Nicolas Tower, The Chain Tower, Lantern Tower (La Rochelle, France).
- La Rochelle Town Hall, in the Renaissance style.

In Surgères:

- The Romanesque church of Notre-Dame.

In Rochefort:

- The Royal Ropemakers.

== Notable people ==
- Amador de la Porte, Governor of the Saintonge and Aunis regions.

== Sources ==
- Bouillet, Marie-Nicolas; Chassang, Alexis, eds. (1878). "Aunis". Dictionnaire Bouillet (in French). Vol. 1. p. 143.
- Delayant, L. (1872), Histoire de la Charente-Inférieure [History of the Lower Charente] (in French), La Rochelle: H. Petit (publisher/editor)
- de La Torre, M. (1985). Guide l'art et de la nature – Charente-Maritime [Art and Nature Guide – Charente-Maritime] (in French). Nathan.
- de Vaux de Foletier, F. (2000). Princi Néguer (ed.). Histoire d'Aunis et de Saintonge [History of Aunis and Santoigne] (in French).
- Cassagne, J. M.; Korsak, M. Origine des noms de villes et villages de la Charente-Maritime [Origins of names of towns and villages of Charente-Maritime] (in French). Éditions Bordessoules.
- Flohic, J. L. (2002). Le patrimoine des communes de la Charente-Maritime [Names in the Charente-Maritime communes]. Collection le patrimoine des communes (in French). Flohic éditions.
