= Saint-Médard-d'Aunis =

- Commune
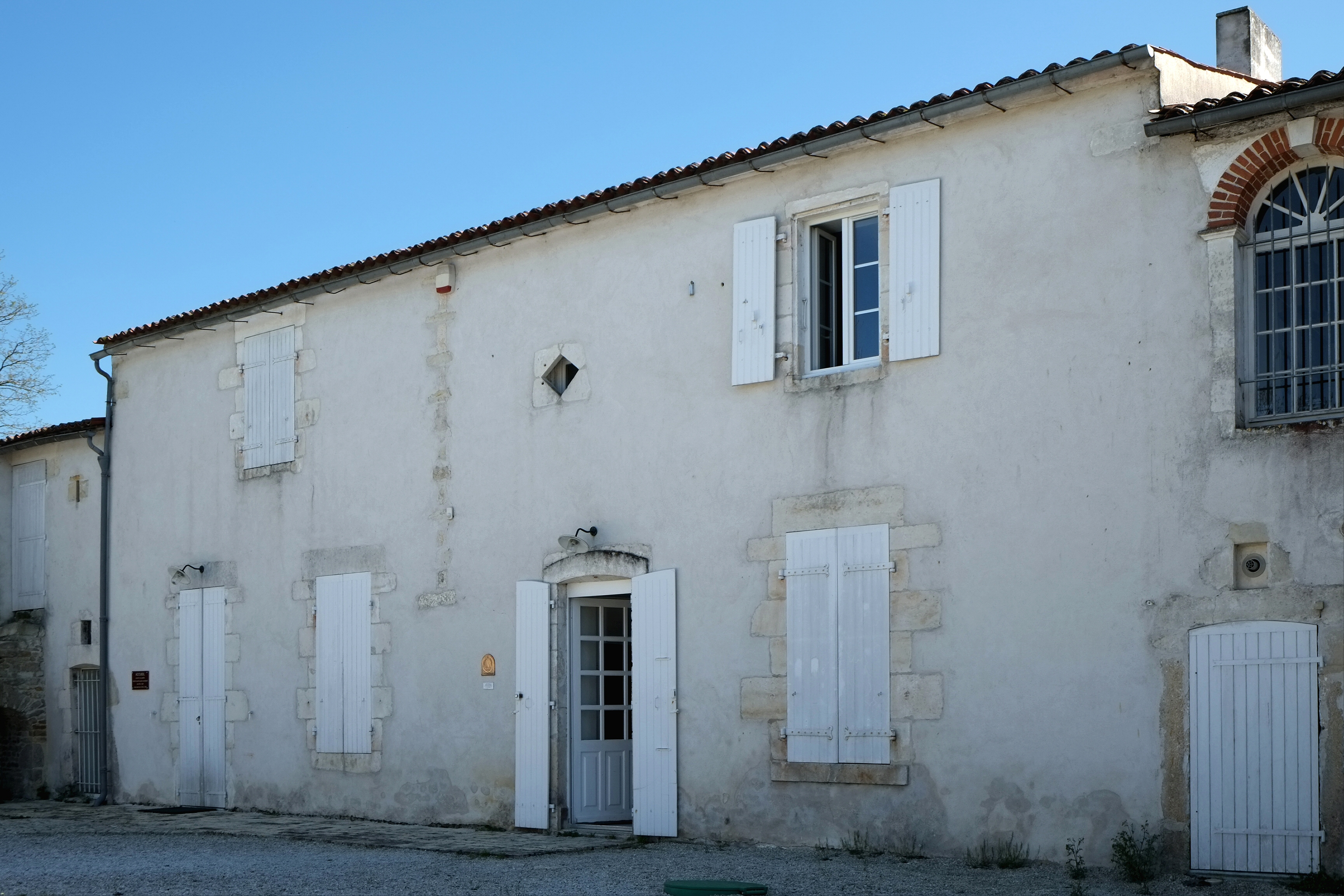
- The town hall in Saint-Médard-d'Aunis
- Location of Saint-Médard-d'Aunis
- Location within France Location within Nouvelle-Aquitaine
- Coordinates: 46°09′36″N 0°57′25″W
- Country: France
- Region: Nouvelle-Aquitaine
- Department: Charente-Maritime
- Arrondissement: La Rochelle
- Canton: La Jarrie
- Intercommunality: CA La Rochelle

Government
  - Mayor (2020–2026): Roger Gervais
- Area^{1}: 22.53 km^{2} (8.70 sq mi)
- Elevation: 30 m (98 ft)
- Highest elevation: 44 m (144 ft)
- Lowest elevation: 4 m (13 ft)
- Population (2023): 2,396
  - Density: 106.3/km^{2} (275.4/sq mi)
- Time zone: UTC+01:00 (CET)
  - Summer (DST): UTC+02:00 (CEST)
- INSEE/Postal code: 17373 /17220
- ^{1} French Land Register data, which excludes lakes, ponds, glaciers > 1 km^{2} (0.386 sq mi or 247 acres) and river estuaries.

Saint-Médard-d'Aunis (French pronunciation: [sɛ̃ medaʁ doni(s)], literally Saint-Médard of Aunis) is a commune in the Charente-Maritime department in the Nouvelle-Aquitaine region in southwestern France.

== Population ==
Historical population
Year	Pop.	±% p.a.
1968	713	—
1975	764	+0.99%
1982	1,002	+3.95%
1990	1,073	+0.86%
1999	1,253	+1.74%
2007	1,558	+2.76%
2012	1,965	+4.75%
2017	2,255	+2.79%
2023	2,396	+1.02%
Source: INSEE

== See also ==
- Communes of the Charente-Maritime department
