= Grolleau =

Grolleau can mean:

- Charles Grolleau - French literary scholar who co-wrote Anthologie des écrivains catholiques, prosateurs français du XVIIème siècle (1919) with Henri Brémond.
- Grolleau (hamlet) - a hamlet in the French commune of La Jarrie
- Grolleau (grape) - a French red wine grape
