= Montroy =

Montroy may refer to:

- Montroy, Charente-Maritime, a commune in France
- Montroy, Valencia, a municipality in Spain
