= Communauté d'agglomération de La Rochelle =

Coordinates: 46.16°N 1.15°W

La Rochelle
- Communauté d'agglomération
- Country: France
- Region: Nouvelle-Aquitaine
- Department: Charente-Maritime
- No. of communes: {{{nbcomm}}}
- Established: January 2000

Government
  - President (2020–2026): Jean-François Fountaine (DVG)
- Area: 327.0 km^{2} (126.3 sq mi)
- Population (2018): 171,811
  - Density: 525.4/km^{2} (1,361/sq mi)
- Website: Agglomeration community of La Rochelle

The Communauté d'agglomération de La Rochelle is the communauté d'agglomération, an intercommunal structure, centred on the city of La Rochelle. It is located in the Charente-Maritime department, in the Nouvelle-Aquitaine region, South West France. Its area is 327.0 km^{2}. Its population was 171,811 in 2018, of which 76,114 in La Rochelle proper.

In January 2000, the Community of cities of La Rochelle (French: Communauté de villes de La Rochelle) turned into the Communauté d'agglomération de La Rochelle. It was expanded with 10 more communes in January 2014.

The Communauté d'agglomération de La Rochelle divides into two constituencies: Charente-Maritime's 1st constituency and Charente-Maritime's 2nd constituency. A mayor of La Rochelle from April 1999 to April 2014 and an MP of the Charente-Maritime's 1st constituency from April 1999 to June 2012, Maxime Bono was the president of the Communauté d'agglomération de La Rochelle from its creation to April 2014, when he was succeeded by Jean-François Fountaine.

== Composition ==
The communauté d'agglomération consists of the following 28 communes:

1. Angoulins
2. Aytré
3. Bourgneuf
4. Châtelaillon-Plage
5. Clavette
6. Croix-Chapeau
7. Dompierre-sur-Mer
8. Esnandes
9. L'Houmeau
10. La Jarne
11. La Jarrie
12. Lagord
13. Marsilly
14. Montroy
15. Nieul-sur-Mer
16. Périgny
17. Puilboreau
18. La Rochelle
19. Saint-Christophe
20. Sainte-Soulle
21. Saint-Médard-d'Aunis
22. Saint-Rogatien
23. Saint-Vivien
24. Saint-Xandre
25. Salles-sur-Mer
26. Thairé
27. Vérines
28. Yves

The communes are located in the cantons of Aytré, Châtelaillon-Plage (partly), La Jarrie (partly), Lagord and La Rochelle-1, 2 and 3.
