= Saint-Rogatien =

- Commune
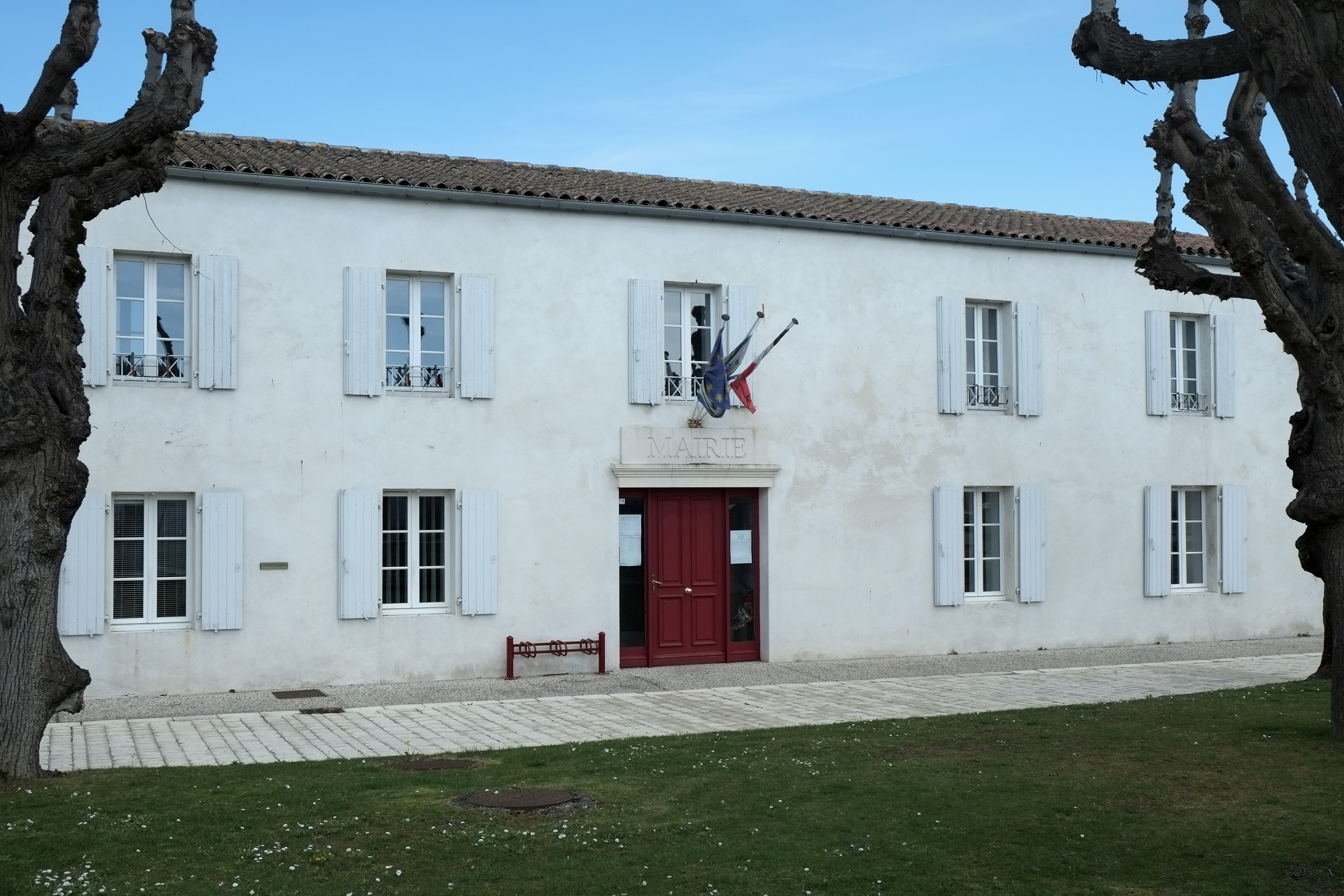
- The town hall of Saint-Rogatien
- Location of Saint-Rogatien
- Location within France Location within Nouvelle-Aquitaine
- Coordinates: 46°09′08″N 1°04′15″W
- Country: France
- Region: Nouvelle-Aquitaine
- Department: Charente-Maritime
- Arrondissement: La Rochelle
- Canton: La Jarrie
- Intercommunality: CA La Rochelle

Government
  - Mayor (2020–2026): Didier Larelle
- Area^{1}: 5.19 km^{2} (2.00 sq mi)
- Elevation: 16 m (52 ft)
- Highest elevation: 33 m (108 ft)
- Lowest elevation: 9 m (30 ft)
- Population (2023): 2,364
  - Density: 455/km^{2} (1,180/sq mi)
- Time zone: UTC+01:00 (CET)
  - Summer (DST): UTC+02:00 (CEST)
- INSEE/Postal code: 17391 /17220
- ^{1} French Land Register data, which excludes lakes, ponds, glaciers > 1 km^{2} (0.386 sq mi or 247 acres) and river estuaries.

Saint-Rogatien (French pronunciation: [sɛ̃ ʁɔɡasjɛ̃]) is a commune in the Charente-Maritime department in the Nouvelle-Aquitaine region in southwestern France.

Besides the town, the town includes the area of Casse-Mortier and part of the village Pommerou, shared with the town of Clavette.

== Gallery ==
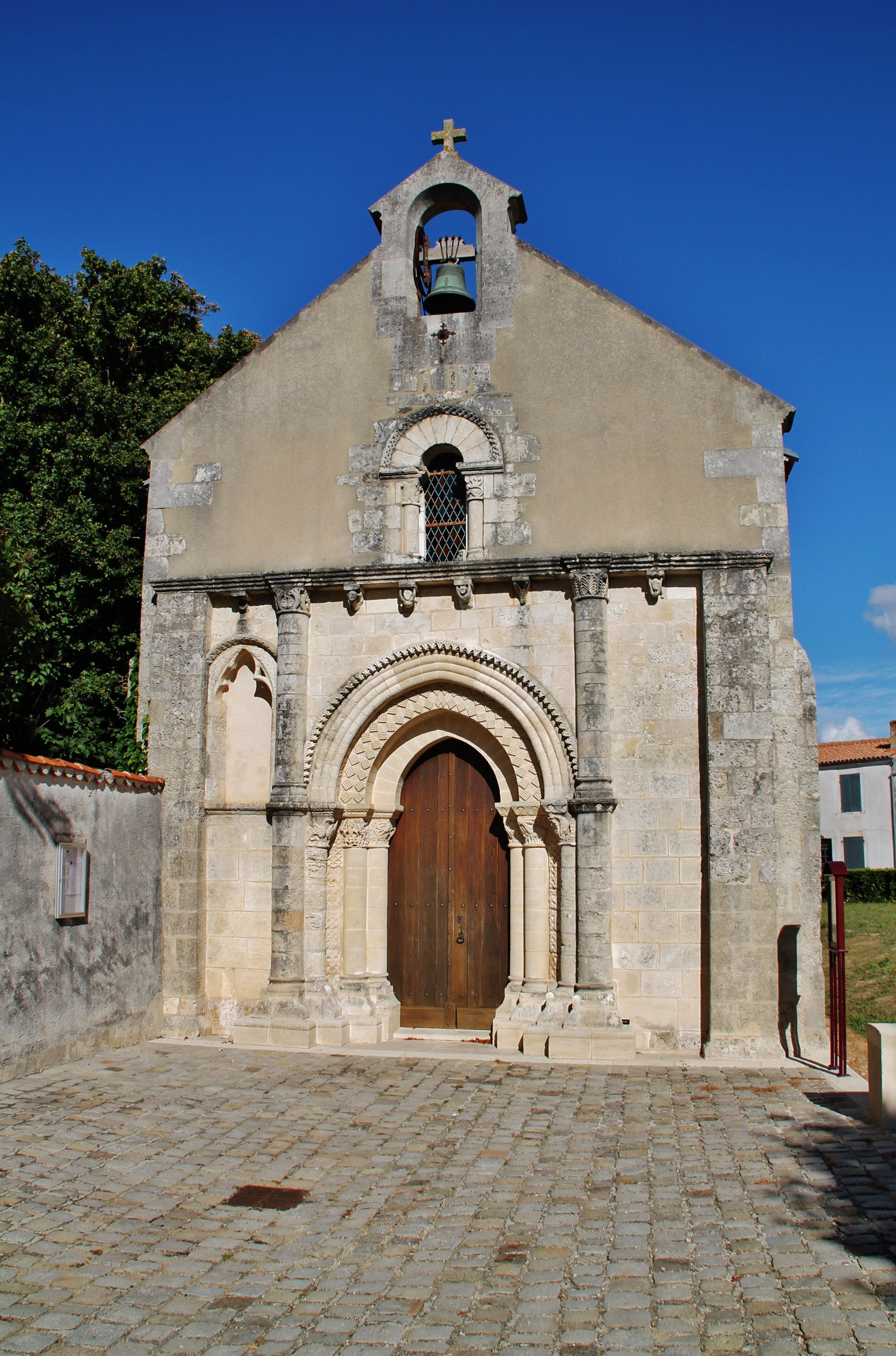
St Rogatien church

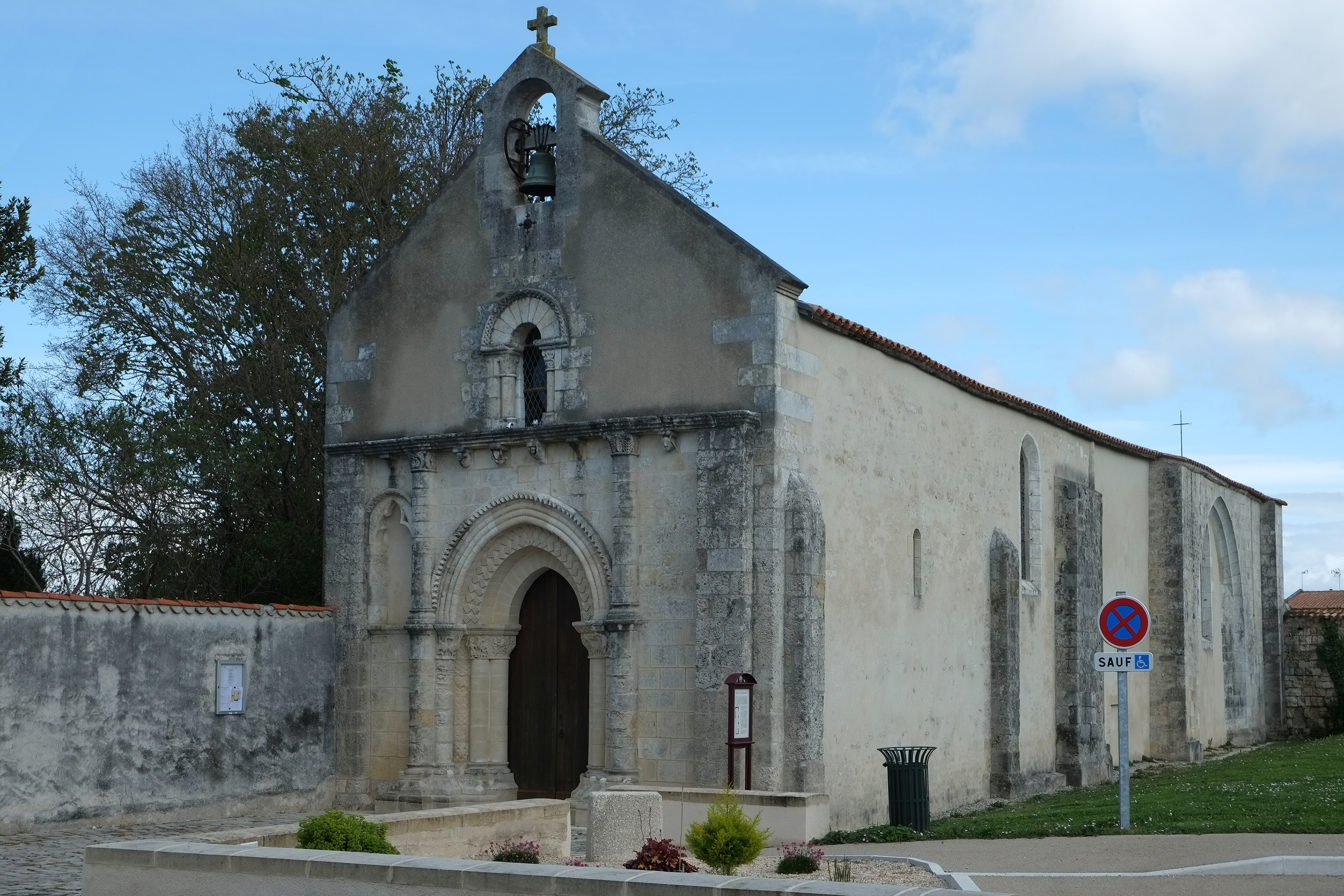
Eglise de Saint-Rogatien

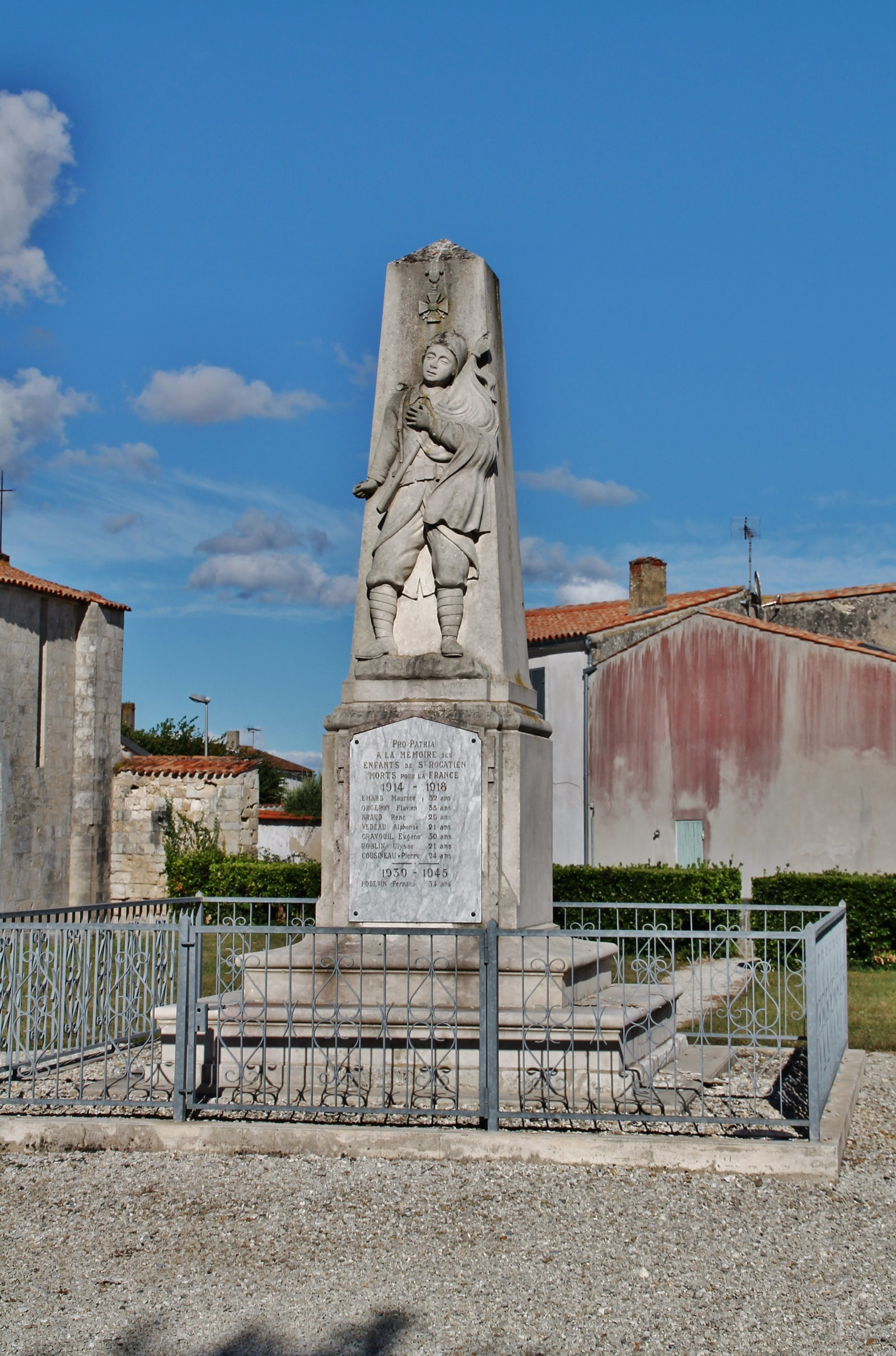
Memorial stone

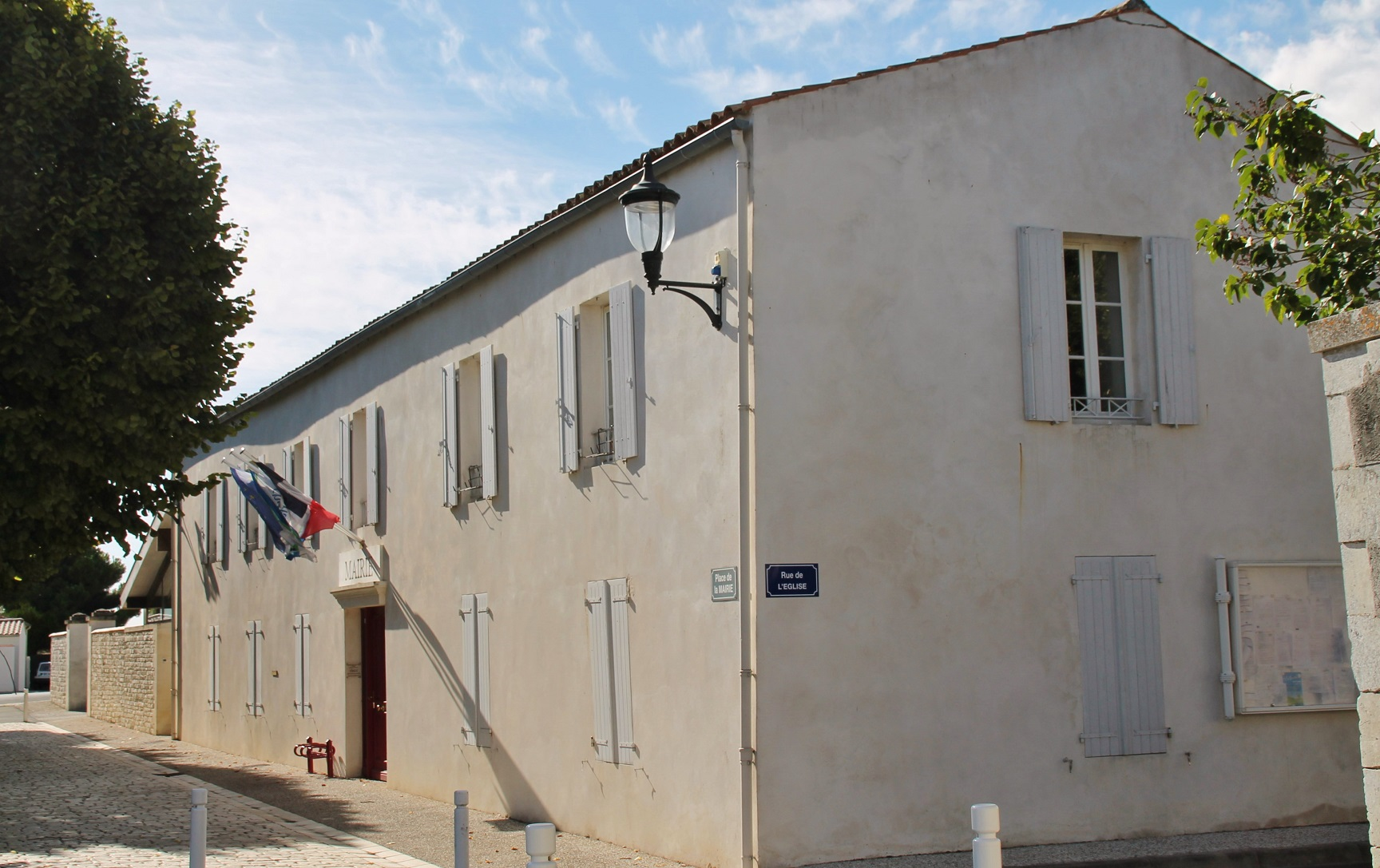
The Mairie in Saint-Rogatien

== Église Saint-Rogatien-Saint-Donatien ==
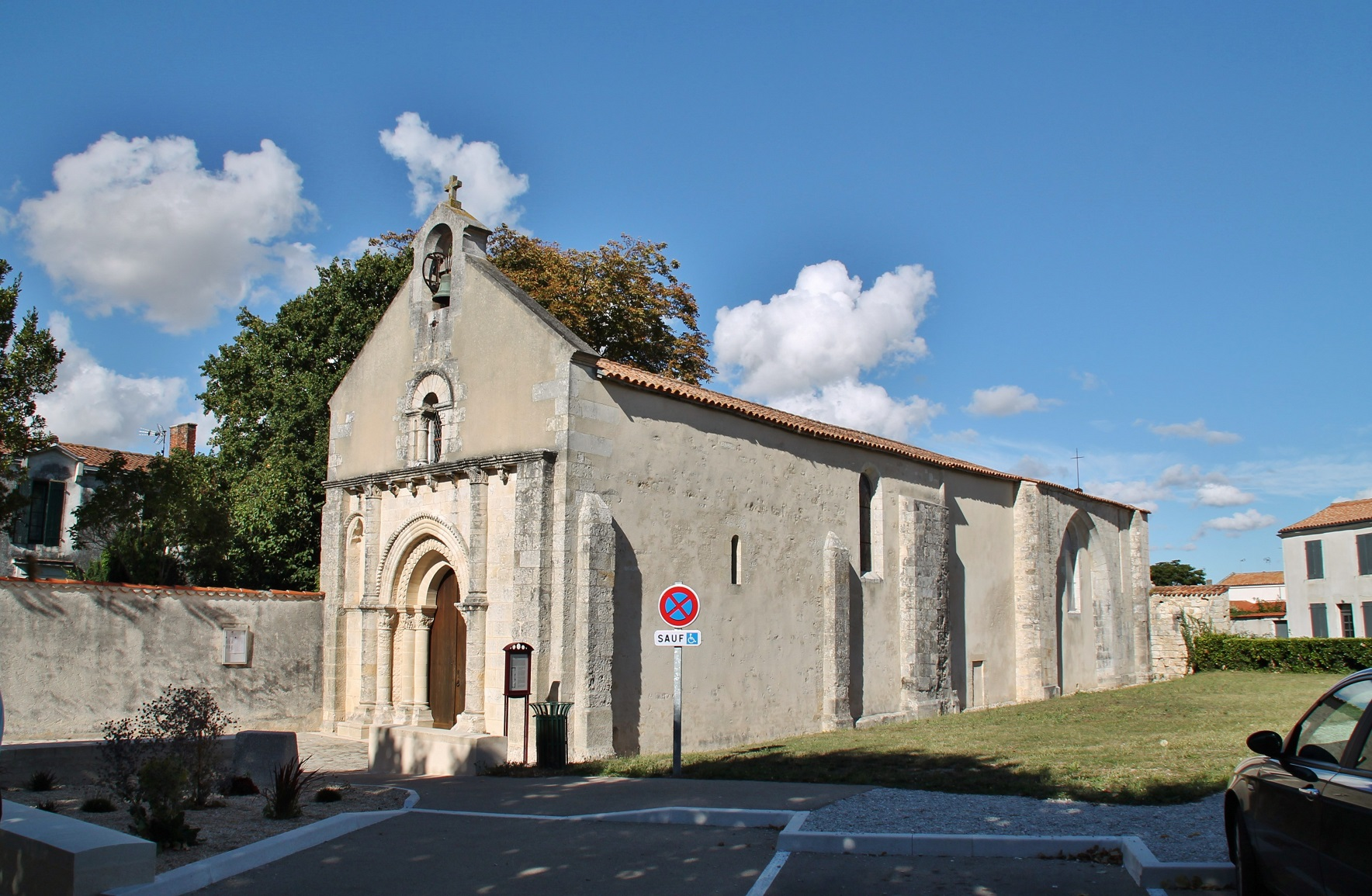
Église Saint-Rogatien-Saint-Donatien.

This church built of limestone in the 12th century and renovated in the 19th century is dedicated to Nantes' two martyrs, partially destroyed during the Wars of Religion, it is largely late medieval but retains its Romanesque portal and a Gothic trefoil recess. The choir stalls were rebuilt in large part to the late Middle Ages. A granite tithe measure from the fifteenth or sixteenth century, is used as the church font. In 1871, a bell tower was installed. In 1884, a restoration project was planned but didn't eventuate till 1987, when the facade was restored, the west weakened by weathering.

== Population ==
Its inhabitants are called Rogatiens and Rogatiennes in French.

Historical population

Year	Pop.	±% p.a.
1793	411	—
1800	299	−4.44%
1806	362	+3.24%
1821	436	+1.25%
1831	448	+0.27%
1836	449	+0.04%
1841	467	+0.79%
1846	470	+0.13%
1851	506	+1.49%
1856	456	−2.06%
1861	490	+1.45%
1866	479	−0.45%
1872	464	−0.53%
1876	515	+2.64%
1886	389	−2.77%
1891	355	−1.81%
1896	375	+1.10%
1901	323	−2.94%

Year	Pop.	±% p.a.
1906	324	+0.06%
1911	339	+0.91%
1921	303	−1.12%
1926	293	−0.67%
1931	299	+0.41%
1936	309	+0.66%
1946	303	−0.20%
1954	296	−0.29%
1962	346	+1.97%
1968	357	+0.52%
1975	557	+6.56%
1982	753	+4.40%
1990	1,272	+6.77%
1999	1,805	+3.97%
2007	1,802	−0.02%
2012	1,956	+1.65%
2017	2,206	+2.43%
2023	2,364	+1.16%

Source: EHESS and INSEE

== Map of the Commune ==
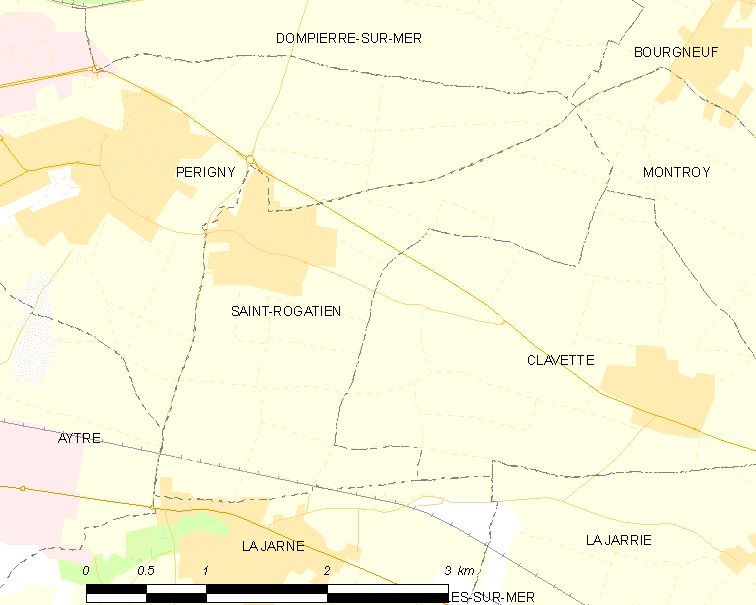
Map of the commune

== See also ==
- Communes of the Charente-Maritime département
