= Croix-Chapeau =

- Commune
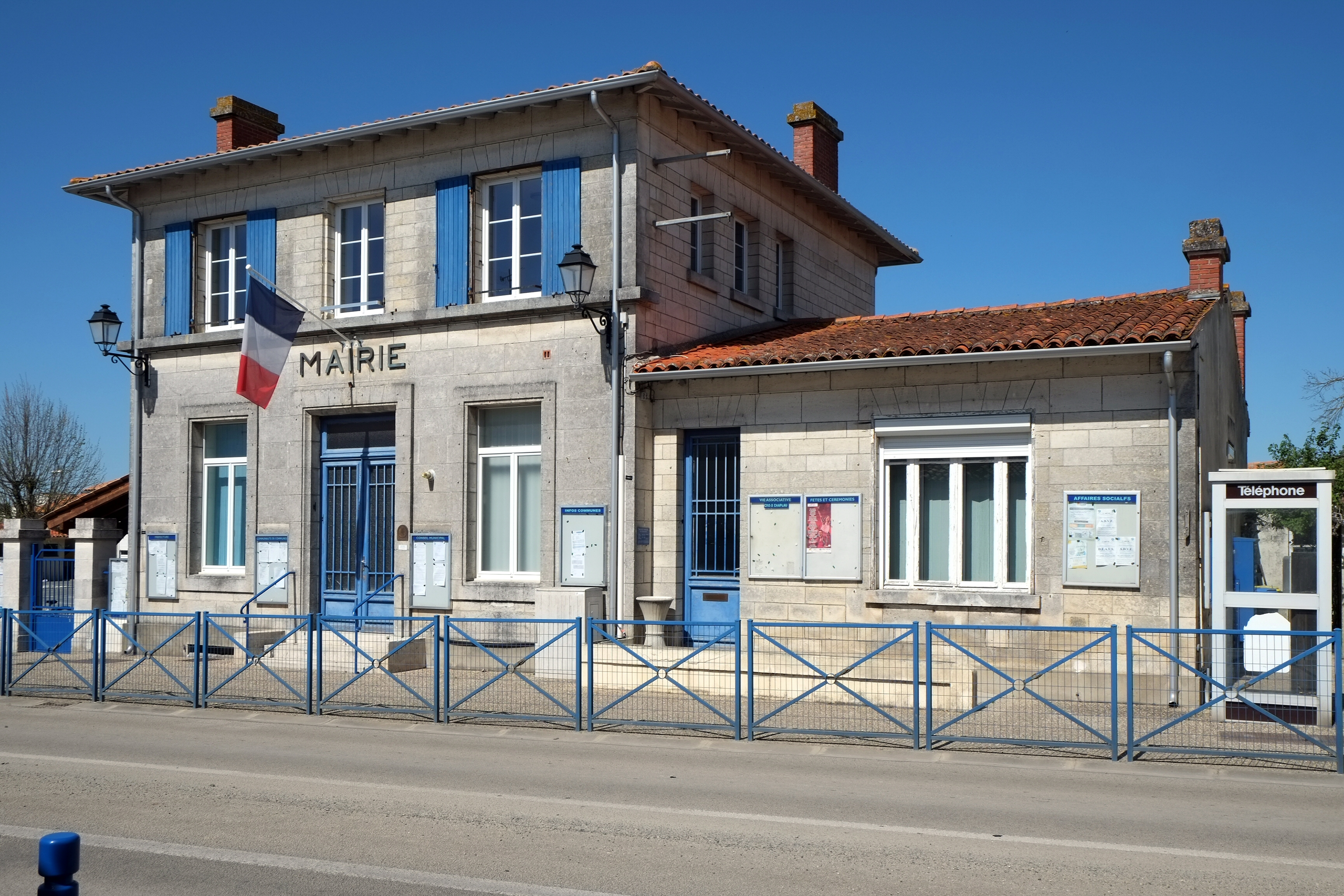
- Town hall
- Location of Croix-Chapeau
- Location within France Location within Nouvelle-Aquitaine
- Coordinates: 46°06′34″N 1°00′20″W
- Country: France
- Region: Nouvelle-Aquitaine
- Department: Charente-Maritime
- Arrondissement: La Rochelle
- Canton: La Jarrie
- Intercommunality: CA La Rochelle

Government
  - Mayor (2020–2026): Patrick Bouffet
- Area^{1}: 4.83 km^{2} (1.86 sq mi)
- Elevation: 24 m (79 ft)
- Highest elevation: 51 m (167 ft)
- Lowest elevation: 17 m (56 ft)
- Population (2023): 1,418
  - Density: 294/km^{2} (760/sq mi)
- Time zone: UTC+01:00 (CET)
  - Summer (DST): UTC+02:00 (CEST)
- INSEE/Postal code: 17136 /17220
- ^{1} French Land Register data, which excludes lakes, ponds, glaciers > 1 km^{2} (0.386 sq mi or 247 acres) and river estuaries.

Croix-Chapeau (French pronunciation: [kʁwa ʃapo]) is a commune in the Charente-Maritime department in southwestern France.

== History ==
From 1953 to 1966 there was a 500-bed U.S. Army hospital in Croix-Chapeau, run by the 28th General Hospital unit, which is actually located on the neighboring town of Aigrefeuille-d'Aunis. For a while after 1966 it was used as a French Military Hospital. After being abandoned for several years, it was sold to a developer, who in the 2000s repurposed it as an industrial park.

== Notable people ==
Paul Henderson, born August 15, 1962, in Croix-Chapeau, former chief minister of the Northern Territory for Australia.

== Population ==
Historical population
Year	Pop.	±% p.a.
1968	562	—
1975	555	−0.18%
1982	683	+3.01%
1990	863	+2.97%
1999	890	+0.34%
2007	1,087	+2.53%
2012	1,197	+1.95%
2017	1,245	+0.79%
2023	1,418	+2.19%
Source: INSEE

== See also ==
- Communes of the Charente-Maritime department
