= Nuaillé-d'Aunis =

- Commune
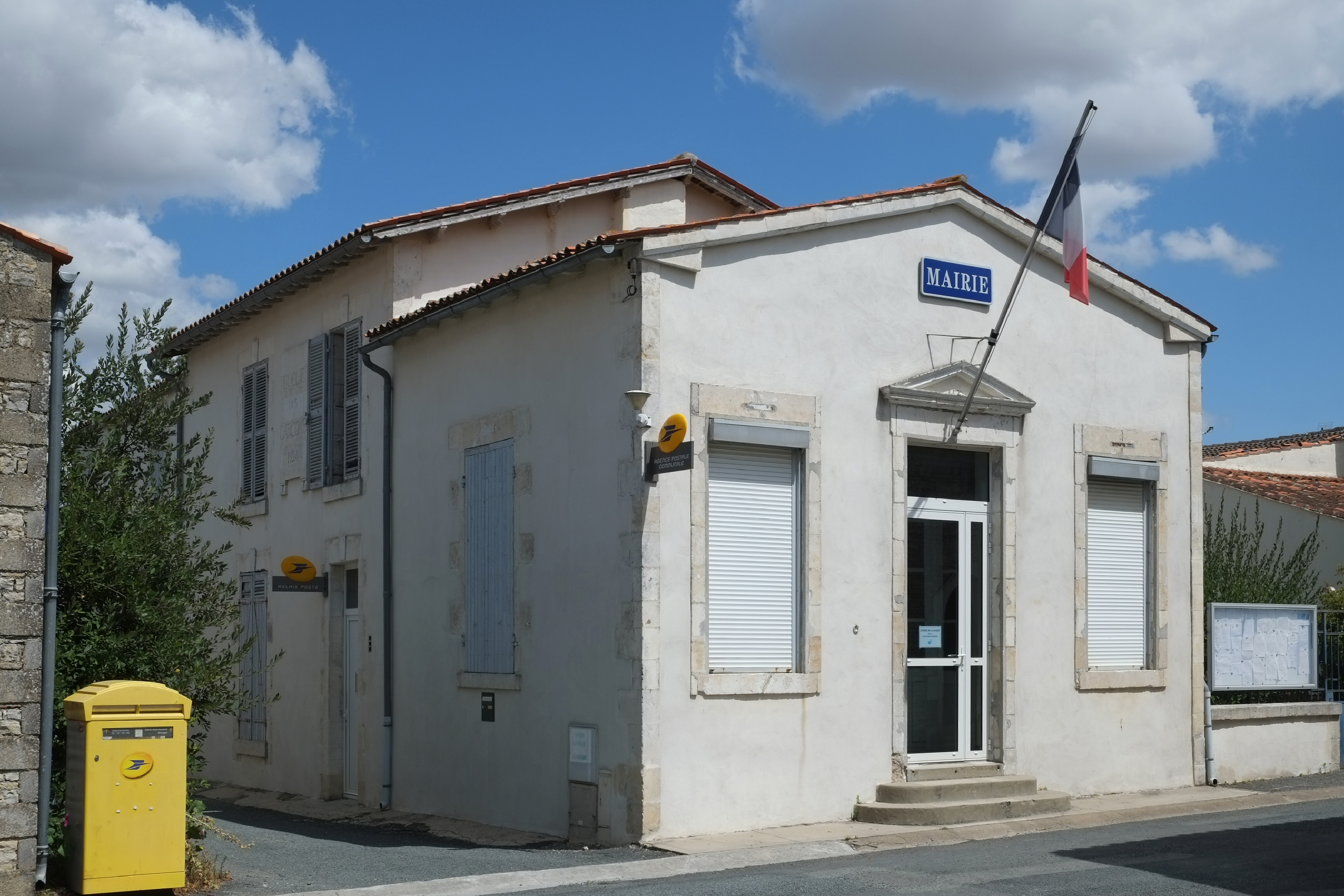
- The town hall in Nuaillé-d'Aunis

- Coat of arms
- Location of Nuaillé-d'Aunis
- Location within France Location within Nouvelle-Aquitaine
- Coordinates: 46°13′32″N 0°55′47″W
- Country: France
- Region: Nouvelle-Aquitaine
- Department: Charente-Maritime
- Arrondissement: La Rochelle
- Canton: Marans

Government
  - Mayor (2020–2026): Philippe Neau
- Area^{1}: 16.47 km^{2} (6.36 sq mi)
- Elevation: 7 m (23 ft)
- Highest elevation: 29 m (95 ft)
- Lowest elevation: 0 m (0 ft)
- Population (2023): 1,279
  - Density: 77.66/km^{2} (201.1/sq mi)
- Time zone: UTC+01:00 (CET)
  - Summer (DST): UTC+02:00 (CEST)
- INSEE/Postal code: 17267 /17540
- ^{1} French Land Register data, which excludes lakes, ponds, glaciers > 1 km^{2} (0.386 sq mi or 247 acres) and river estuaries.

Nuaillé-d'Aunis (French pronunciation: [nɥaje doni(s)], literally Nuaillé of Aunis) is a commune in the Charente-Maritime department in the Nouvelle-Aquitaine region in southwestern France.

== Population ==
Historical population
Year	Pop.	±% p.a.
1968	515	—
1975	515	+0.00%
1982	518	+0.08%
1990	550	+0.75%
1999	632	+1.56%
2007	924	+4.86%
2012	1,157	+4.60%
2017	1,139	−0.31%
2023	1,279	+1.95%
Source: INSEE

== See also ==
- Communes of the Charente-Maritime department
