= Bourgneuf, Charente-Maritime =

Bourgneuf
- Commune
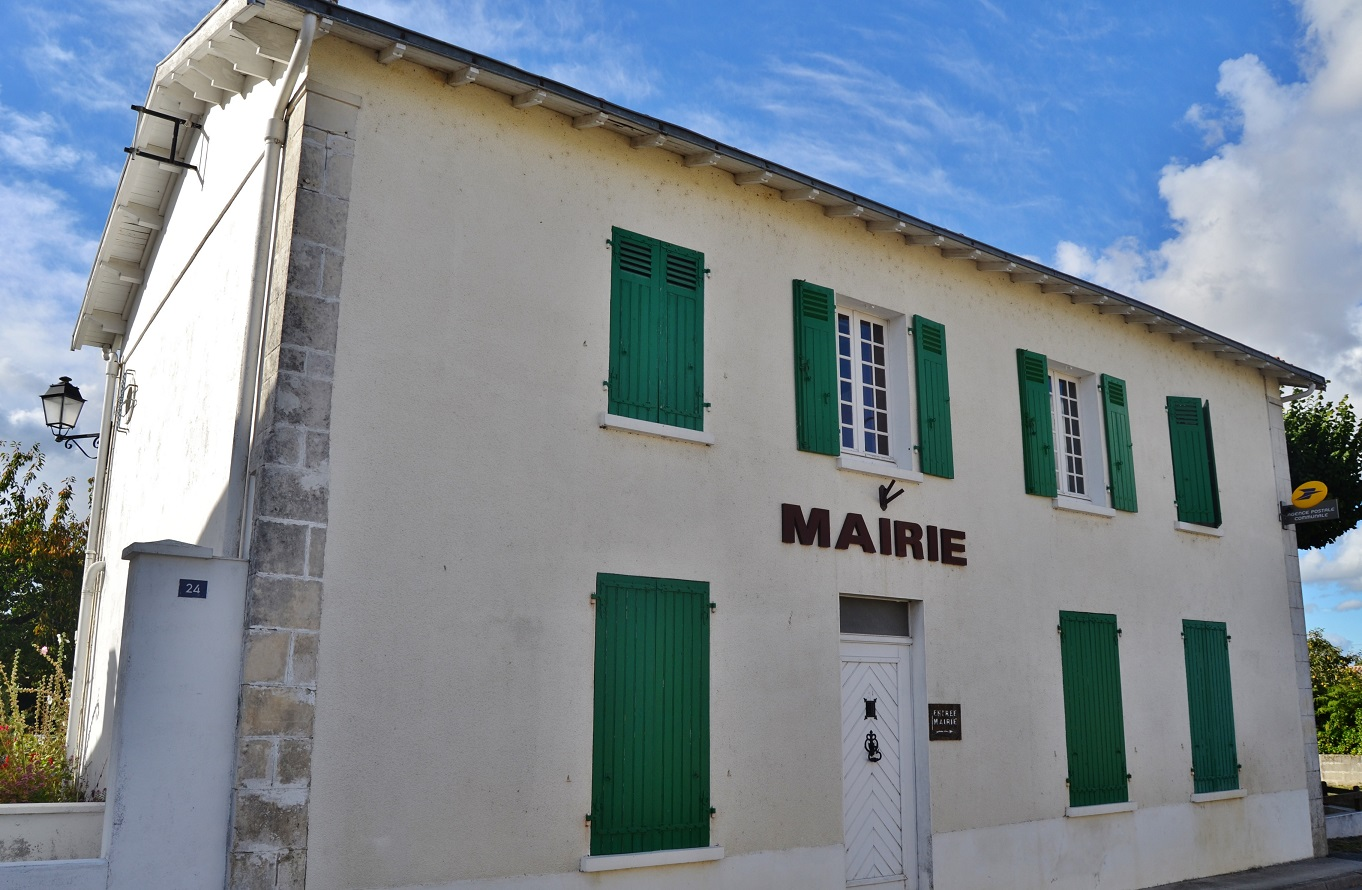
- The town hall in Bourgneuf
- Location of Bourgneuf
- Location within France Location within Nouvelle-Aquitaine
- Coordinates: 46°10′04″N 1°01′23″W
- Country: France
- Region: Nouvelle-Aquitaine
- Department: Charente-Maritime
- Arrondissement: La Rochelle
- Canton: La Jarrie
- Intercommunality: CA La Rochelle

Government
  - Mayor (2020–2026): Paul-Roland Vincent
- Area^{1}: 2.68 km^{2} (1.03 sq mi)
- Elevation: 35 m (115 ft)
- Highest elevation: 47 m (154 ft)
- Lowest elevation: 22 m (72 ft)
- Population (2023): 1,463
  - Density: 546/km^{2} (1,410/sq mi)
- Time zone: UTC+01:00 (CET)
  - Summer (DST): UTC+02:00 (CEST)
- INSEE/Postal code: 17059 /17220
- ^{1} French Land Register data, which excludes lakes, ponds, glaciers > 1 km^{2} (0.386 sq mi or 247 acres) and river estuaries.

Bourgneuf (French pronunciation: [buʁnœf]) is a commune in the Charente-Maritime in the department in the Nouvelle-Aquitaine region in southwestern France.

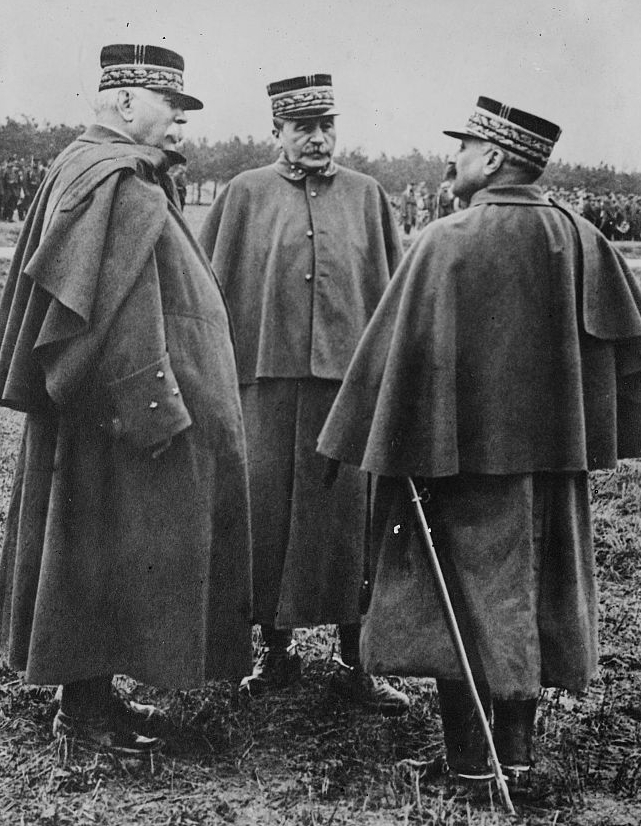
General Adolphe Guillaumat (right), with Fernand de Langle de Cary (center) and Joseph Joffre (left).

General Adolphe Guillaumat was born in Bourgneuf.

== Population ==
Historical population
Year	Pop.	±% p.a.
1968	313	—
1975	404	+3.71%
1982	841	+11.04%
1990	1,044	+2.74%
1999	1,041	−0.03%
2007	1,060	+0.23%
2012	1,079	+0.36%
2017	1,275	+3.39%
2023	1,463	+2.32%
Source: INSEE

== See also ==
- Communes of the Charente-Maritime department
