= Vérines =

- Commune
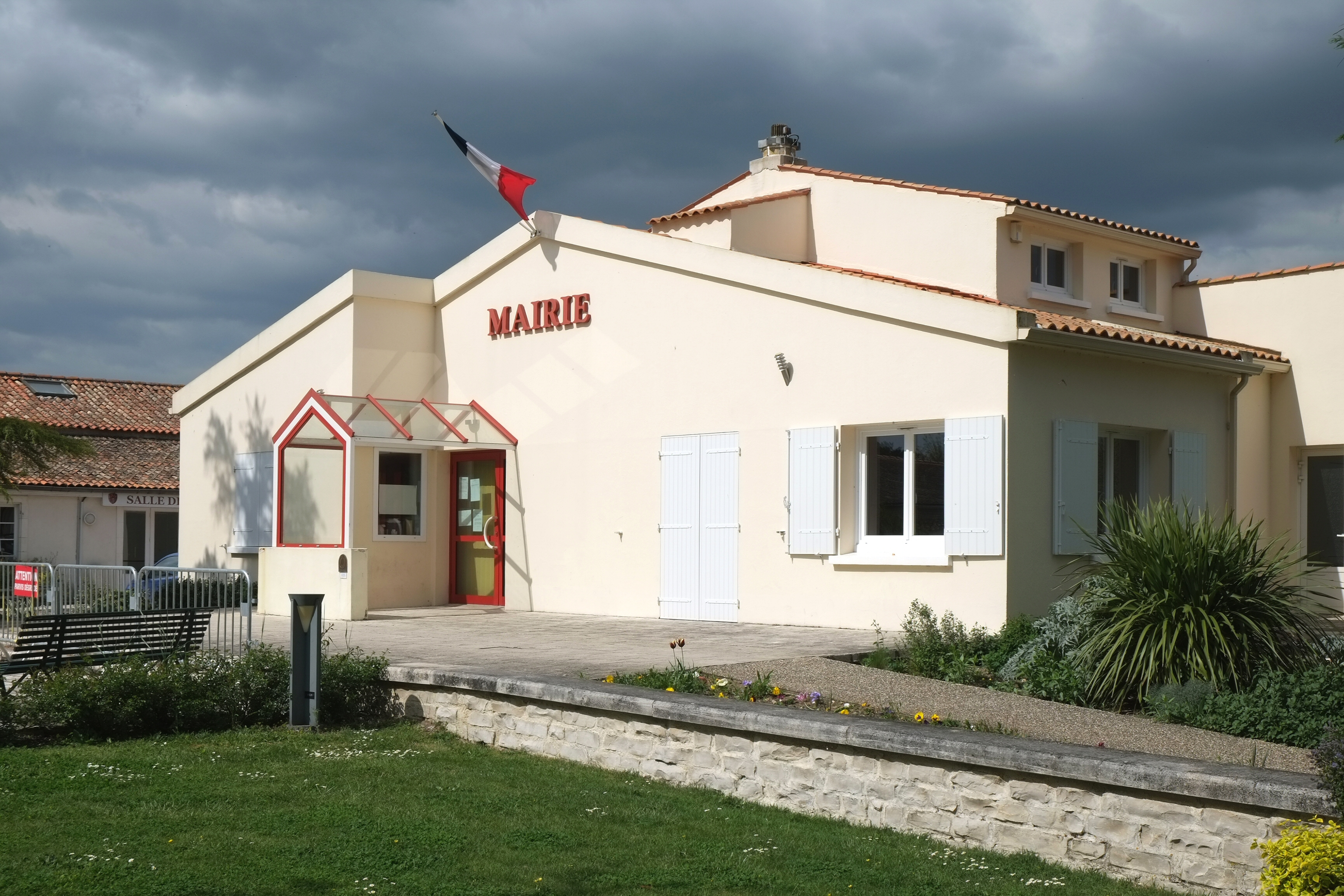
- The town hall in Vérines
- Location of Vérines
- Location within France Location within Nouvelle-Aquitaine
- Coordinates: 46°11′41″N 0°57′56″W
- Country: France
- Region: Nouvelle-Aquitaine
- Department: Charente-Maritime
- Arrondissement: La Rochelle
- Canton: La Jarrie
- Intercommunality: CA La Rochelle

Government
  - Mayor (2020–2026): Line Meode
- Area^{1}: 13.35 km^{2} (5.15 sq mi)
- Elevation: 37 m (121 ft)
- Highest elevation: 39 m (128 ft)
- Lowest elevation: 4 m (13 ft)
- Population (2023): 2,354
  - Density: 176.3/km^{2} (456.7/sq mi)
- Time zone: UTC+01:00 (CET)
  - Summer (DST): UTC+02:00 (CEST)
- INSEE/Postal code: 17466 /17220
- ^{1} French Land Register data, which excludes lakes, ponds, glaciers > 1 km^{2} (0.386 sq mi or 247 acres) and river estuaries.

Vérines (French pronunciation: [veʁin]) is a commune in the Charente-Maritime department in the Nouvelle-Aquitaine region in southwestern France.

== Geography ==
The commune consists of a town (Vérines) and two other settlements named Loiré and Fontpatour.

== Population ==
Historical population
Year	Pop.	±% p.a.
1968	729	—
1975	785	+1.06%
1982	1,022	+3.84%
1990	1,166	+1.66%
1999	1,377	+1.87%
2007	1,711	+2.75%
2012	2,137	+4.55%
2017	2,245	+0.99%
2023	2,354	+0.79%
Source: INSEE

== See also ==
- Communes of the Charente-Maritime department
