= Clavette =

- Commune
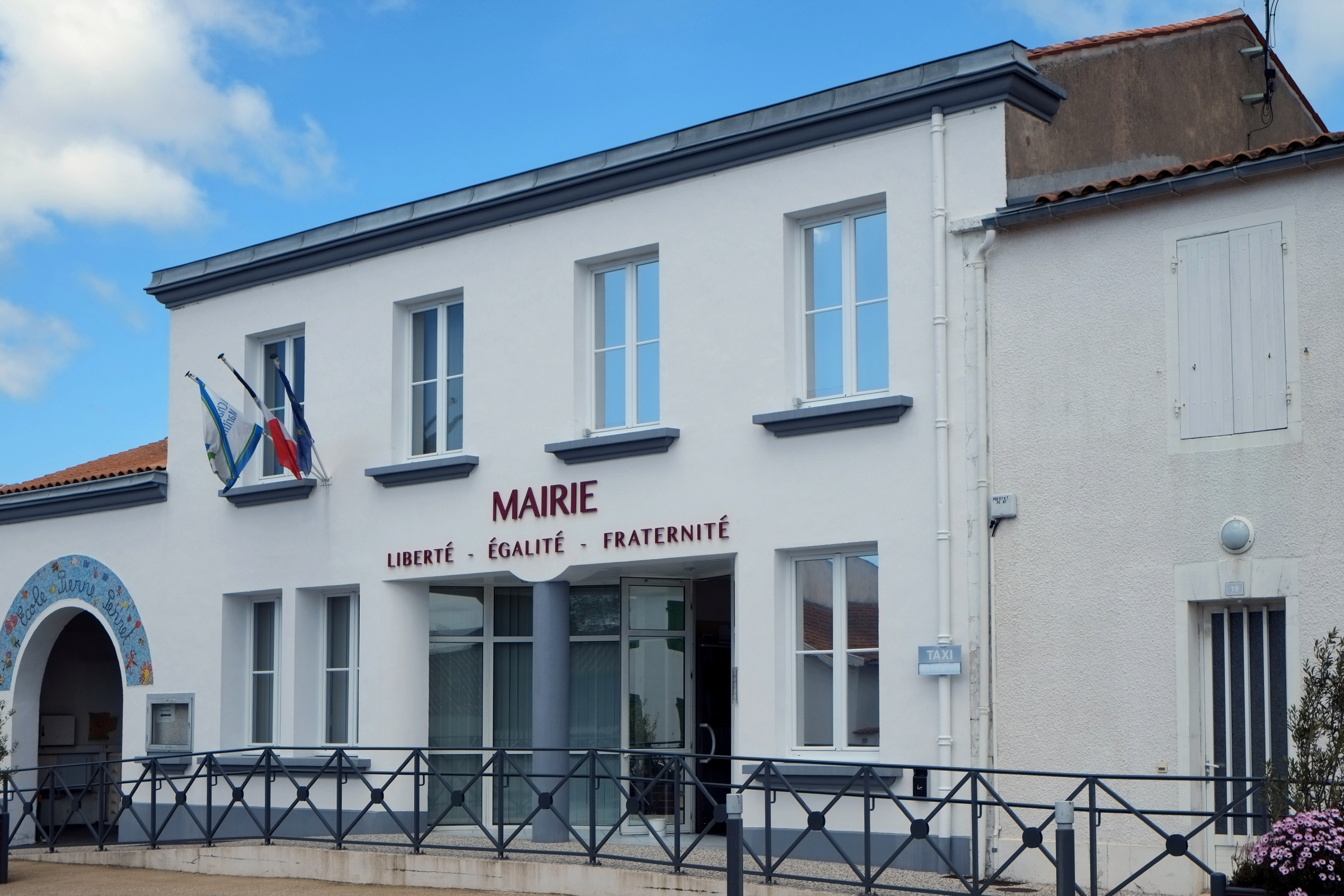
- The town hall in Clavette
- Location of Clavette
- Location within France Location within Nouvelle-Aquitaine
- Coordinates: 46°08′24″N 1°06′10″W
- Country: France
- Region: Nouvelle-Aquitaine
- Department: Charente-Maritime
- Arrondissement: La Rochelle
- Canton: La Jarrie
- Intercommunality: CA La Rochelle

Government
  - Mayor (2020–2026): Sylvie Guerry-Gazeau
- Area^{1}: 6.29 km^{2} (2.43 sq mi)
- Elevation: 25 m (82 ft)
- Highest elevation: 44 m (144 ft)
- Lowest elevation: 14 m (46 ft)
- Population (2023): 1,406
  - Density: 224/km^{2} (579/sq mi)
- Time zone: UTC+01:00 (CET)
  - Summer (DST): UTC+02:00 (CEST)
- INSEE/Postal code: 17109 /17220
- ^{1} French Land Register data, which excludes lakes, ponds, glaciers > 1 km^{2} (0.386 sq mi or 247 acres) and river estuaries.

Clavette (French pronunciation: [klavɛt]) is a commune in the Charente-Maritime in the department in the Nouvelle-Aquitaine region in southwestern France.

== Population ==
Historical population
| Year | Pop. | ±% p.a. |
|---|---|---|
| 1968 | 309 | — |
| 1975 | 319 | +0.46% |
| 1982 | 438 | +4.63% |
| 1990 | 592 | +3.84% |
| 1999 | 711 | +2.06% |
| 2007 | 908 | +3.10% |
| 2012 | 1,290 | +7.28% |
| 2017 | 1,380 | +1.36% |
| 2023 | 1,406 | +0.31% |
Source: INSEE

== See also ==
- Communes of the Charente-Maritime department
