= Sainte-Soulle =

- Commune
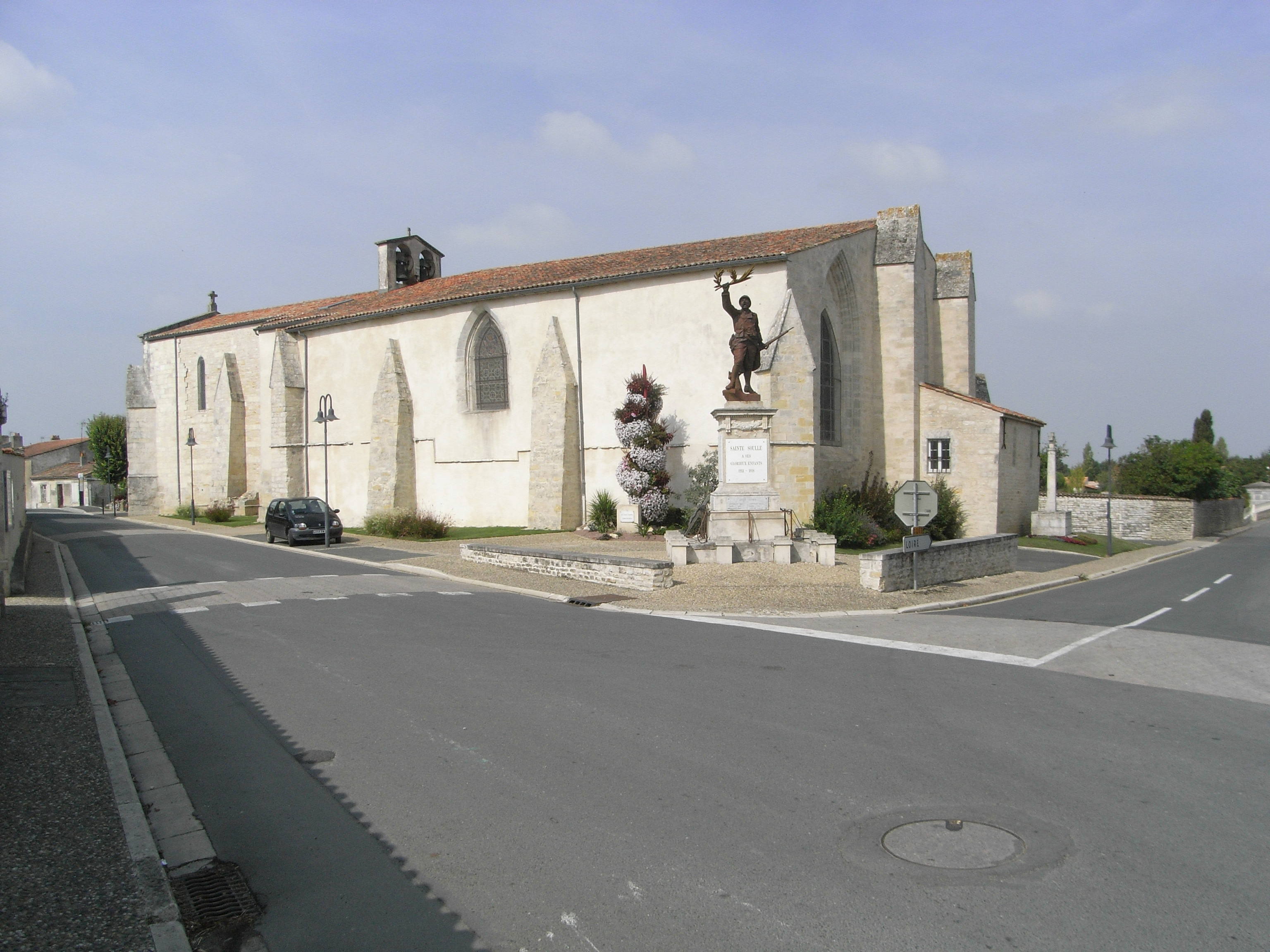
- The church in Sainte-Soulle
- Location of Sainte-Soulle
- Location within France Location within Nouvelle-Aquitaine
- Coordinates: 46°11′13″N 1°00′38″W
- Country: France
- Region: Nouvelle-Aquitaine
- Department: Charente-Maritime
- Arrondissement: La Rochelle
- Canton: La Jarrie
- Intercommunality: CA La Rochelle

Government
  - Mayor (2020–2026): Bertrand Ayral
- Area^{1}: 21.82 km^{2} (8.42 sq mi)
- Elevation: 32 m (105 ft)
- Highest elevation: 42 m (138 ft)
- Lowest elevation: 3 m (9.8 ft)
- Population (2023): 5,034
  - Density: 230.7/km^{2} (597.5/sq mi)
- Time zone: UTC+01:00 (CET)
  - Summer (DST): UTC+02:00 (CEST)
- INSEE/Postal code: 17407 /17220
- ^{1} French Land Register data, which excludes lakes, ponds, glaciers > 1 km^{2} (0.386 sq mi or 247 acres) and river estuaries.

Sainte-Soulle (French pronunciation: [sɛ̃t sul]) is a commune in the Charente-Maritime department in the Nouvelle-Aquitaine region in southwestern France.

== Geography ==
The commune is situated about 12 km (7.5 mi) east of La Rochelle and forms a part of the metropolitan area of La Rochelle.

It is traversed by the N11 (La Rochelle - Paris), which can be accessed at the Usseau roundabout. At the Usseau roundabout, the route connecting La Rochelle with Nantes (N137) branches off the N11. The future highway A831 (Fontenay-le-Comte—Rochefort) will pass through the commune.

Apart from the village Sainte-Soulle, the commune consists of the localities Les Grandes-Rivières, Les Petites-Rivières, Saint-Coux, part of Fontpatour, le Treuil-Arnaudeau, Usseau, La Gabardelière, Chavagne and Le Raguenaud.

Once a farming commune, it underwent urbanisation in the 1990s, and many of its inhabitants now work in nearby La Rochelle.

== History ==
The name of the commune comes from the local saint Soline (see also the commune of Sainte-Soline in the Deux-Sèvres department).

== Population ==
Historical population
Year	Pop.	±% p.a.
1968	1,386	—
1975	1,918	+4.75%
1982	2,221	+2.12%
1990	2,603	+2.00%
1999	2,653	+0.21%
2007	3,351	+2.96%
2012	3,740	+2.22%
2017	4,533	+3.92%
2023	5,034	+1.76%
Source: INSEE

== See also ==
- Communes of the Charente-Maritime department
