= Saint-Christophe, Charente-Maritime =

Saint-Christophe
- Commune
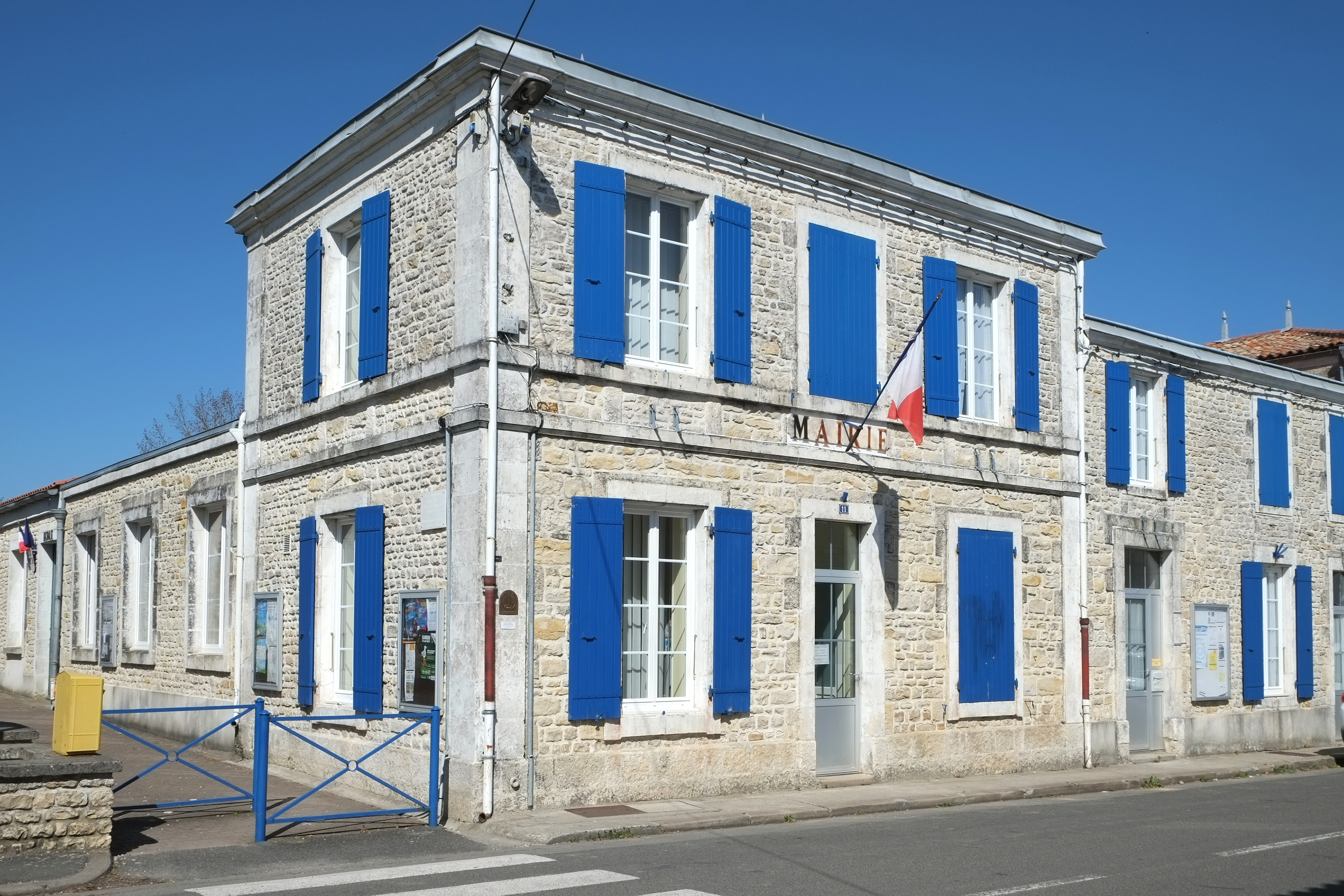
- The town hall in Saint-Christophe
- Location of Saint-Christophe
- Location within France Location within Nouvelle-Aquitaine
- Coordinates: 46°08′46″N 0°56′43″W
- Country: France
- Region: Nouvelle-Aquitaine
- Department: Charente-Maritime
- Arrondissement: La Rochelle
- Canton: La Jarrie
- Intercommunality: CA La Rochelle

Government
  - Mayor (2020–2026): Philippe Chabrier
- Area^{1}: 13.64 km^{2} (5.27 sq mi)
- Elevation: 26 m (85 ft)
- Highest elevation: 43 m (141 ft)
- Lowest elevation: 4 m (13 ft)
- Population (2023): 1,422
  - Density: 104.3/km^{2} (270.0/sq mi)
- Time zone: UTC+01:00 (CET)
  - Summer (DST): UTC+02:00 (CEST)
- INSEE/Postal code: 17315 /17220
- ^{1} French Land Register data, which excludes lakes, ponds, glaciers > 1 km^{2} (0.386 sq mi or 247 acres) and river estuaries.

Saint-Christophe (French pronunciation: [sɛ̃ kʁistɔf]) is a commune in the Charente-Maritime department in the Nouvelle-Aquitaine region in southwestern France.

== Population ==
Historical population
Year	Pop.	±% p.a.
1968	575	—
1975	626	+1.22%
1982	766	+2.93%
1990	827	+0.96%
1999	916	+1.14%
2007	1,135	+2.72%
2012	1,260	+2.11%
2017	1,357	+1.49%
2023	1,422	+0.78%
Source: INSEE

== See also ==
- Communes of the Charente-Maritime department
