= La Jarne =

- Commune
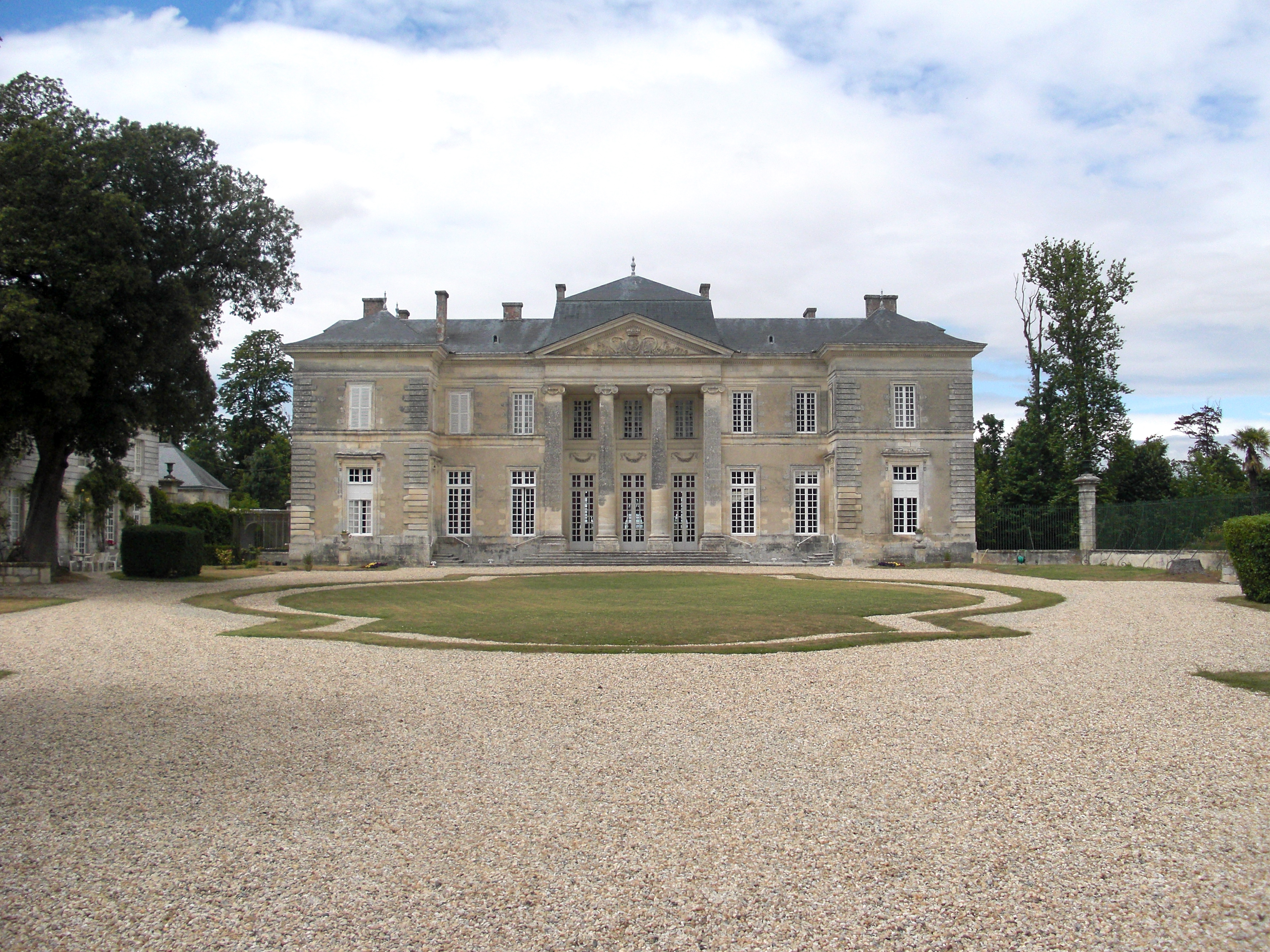
- Chateau of Buzay
- Location of La Jarne
- Location within France Location within Nouvelle-Aquitaine
- Coordinates: 46°07′43″N 1°04′22″W
- Country: France
- Region: Nouvelle-Aquitaine
- Department: Charente-Maritime
- Arrondissement: La Rochelle
- Canton: La Jarrie
- Intercommunality: CA La Rochelle

Government
  - Mayor (2020–2026): Vincent Coppolani
- Area^{1}: 8.42 km^{2} (3.25 sq mi)
- Elevation: 10 m (33 ft)
- Highest elevation: 27 m (89 ft)
- Lowest elevation: 2 m (6.6 ft)
- Population (2023): 2,637
  - Density: 313/km^{2} (811/sq mi)
- Time zone: UTC+01:00 (CET)
  - Summer (DST): UTC+02:00 (CEST)
- INSEE/Postal code: 17193 /17220
- ^{1} French Land Register data, which excludes lakes, ponds, glaciers > 1 km^{2} (0.386 sq mi or 247 acres) and river estuaries.

La Jarne (French pronunciation: [la ʒaʁn]) is a commune in the Charente-Maritime department in southwestern France. It is 7 km southeast of the city of La Rochelle.

== Population ==
Historical population
Year	Pop.	±% p.a.
1968	679	—
1975	973	+5.27%
1982	1,557	+6.95%
1990	1,633	+0.60%
1999	2,054	+2.58%
2007	2,211	+0.92%
2012	2,436	+1.96%
2017	2,490	+0.44%
2023	2,637	+0.96%
Source: INSEE

== See also ==
- Communes of the Charente-Maritime department
