= Montroy, Charente-Maritime =

Montroy
- Commune
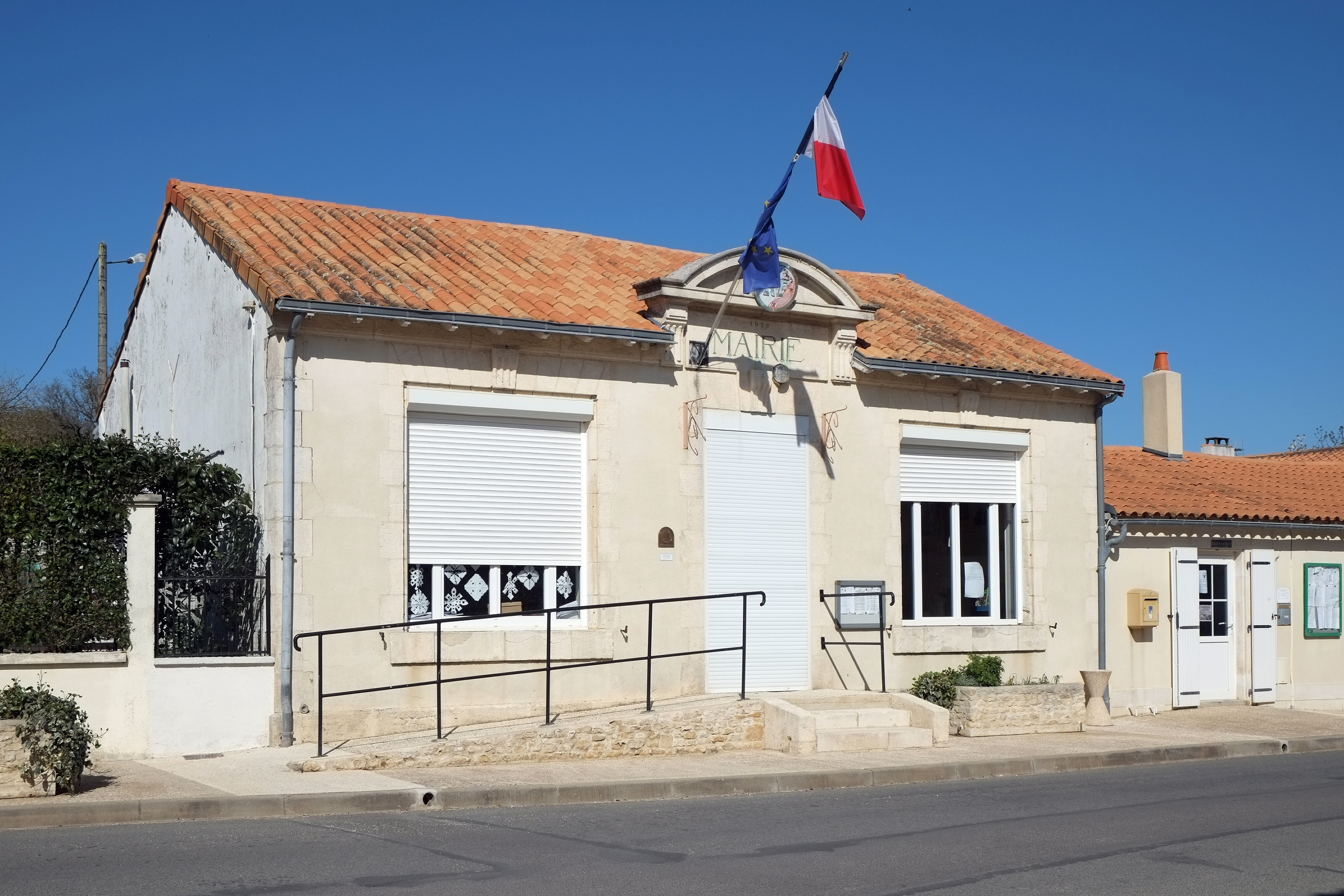
- The town hall in Montroy
- Location of Montroy
- Location within France Location within Nouvelle-Aquitaine
- Coordinates: 46°09′18″N 1°04′37″W
- Country: France
- Region: Nouvelle-Aquitaine
- Department: Charente-Maritime
- Arrondissement: La Rochelle
- Canton: La Jarrie
- Intercommunality: CA La Rochelle

Government
  - Mayor (2020–2026): Viviane Cottreau-Gonzalez
- Area^{1}: 3.99 km^{2} (1.54 sq mi)
- Elevation: 47 m (154 ft)
- Highest elevation: 47 m (154 ft)
- Lowest elevation: 25 m (82 ft)
- Population (2023): 963
  - Density: 241/km^{2} (625/sq mi)
- Time zone: UTC+01:00 (CET)
  - Summer (DST): UTC+02:00 (CEST)
- INSEE/Postal code: 17245 /17220
- ^{1} French Land Register data, which excludes lakes, ponds, glaciers > 1 km^{2} (0.386 sq mi or 247 acres) and river estuaries.

Montroy (French pronunciation: [mɔ̃ʁwa]) is a commune in the Charente-Maritime in the department in the Nouvelle-Aquitaine region in southwestern France.

== Population ==
Historical population
Year	Pop.	±% p.a.
1968	210	—
1975	237	+1.74%
1982	410	+8.14%
1990	486	+2.15%
1999	538	+1.14%
2007	641	+2.21%
2012	670	+0.89%
2017	893	+5.91%
2023	963	+1.27%
Source: INSEE

== See also ==
- Communes of the Charente-Maritime department
