= Thairé =

- Commune
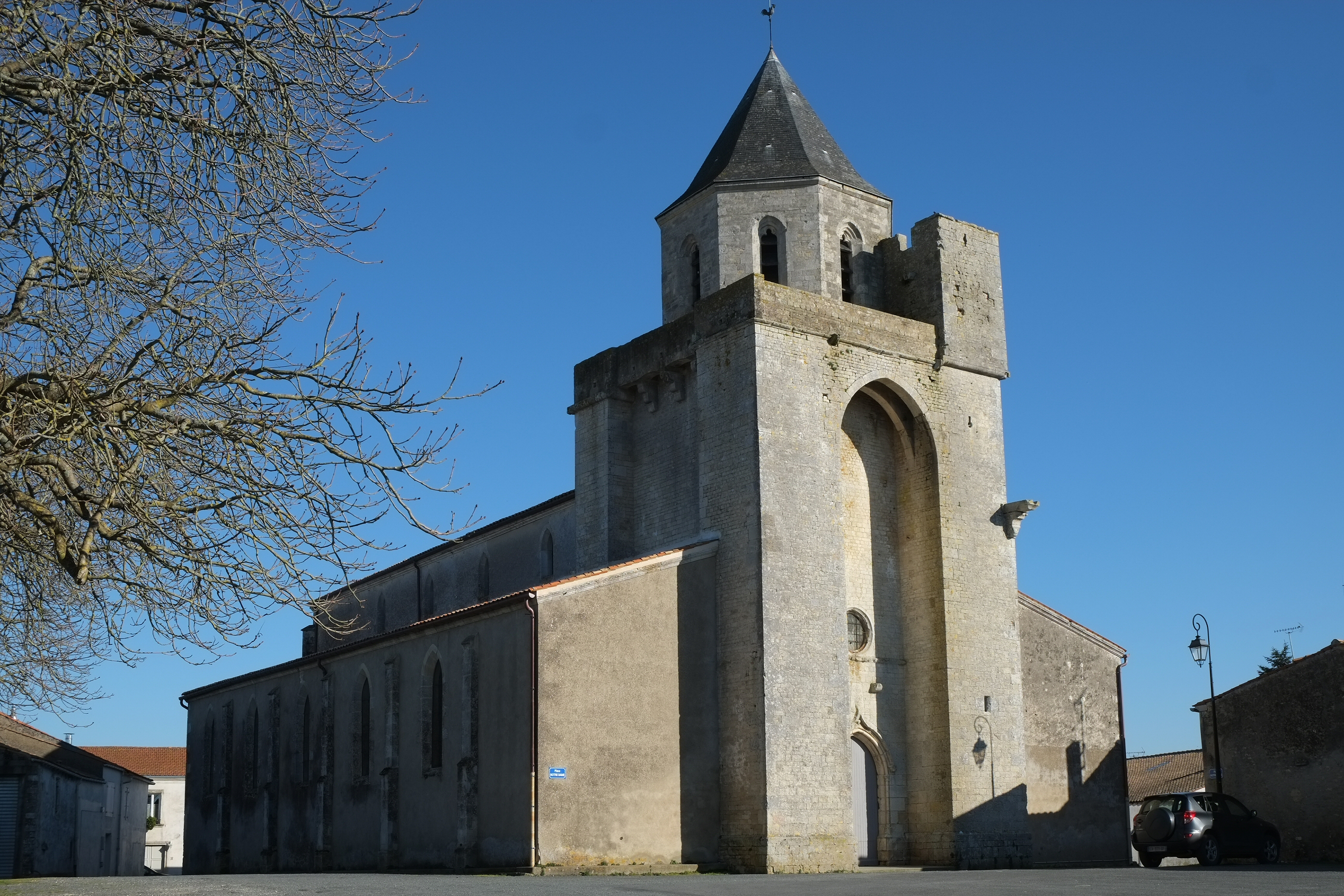
- The church in Thairé

- Coat of arms
- Location of Thairé
- Location within France Location within Nouvelle-Aquitaine
- Coordinates: 46°04′29″N 1°00′07″W
- Country: France
- Region: Nouvelle-Aquitaine
- Department: Charente-Maritime
- Arrondissement: La Rochelle
- Canton: La Jarrie
- Intercommunality: CA La Rochelle

Government
  - Mayor (2024–2026): Sébastien Bourain
- Area^{1}: 18.74 km^{2} (7.24 sq mi)
- Elevation: 11 m (36 ft)
- Highest elevation: 47 m (154 ft)
- Lowest elevation: 1 m (3.3 ft)
- Population (2023): 1,897
  - Density: 101.2/km^{2} (262.2/sq mi)
- Time zone: UTC+01:00 (CET)
  - Summer (DST): UTC+02:00 (CEST)
- INSEE/Postal code: 17443 /17290
- ^{1} French Land Register data, which excludes lakes, ponds, glaciers > 1 km^{2} (0.386 sq mi or 247 acres) and river estuaries.

Thairé (French pronunciation: [tɛʁe]) is a commune in the Charente-Maritime department in the Nouvelle-Aquitaine region in southwestern France on the Atlantic Ocean.

== Population ==
Historical population
Year	Pop.	±% p.a.
1968	774	—
1975	724	−0.95%
1982	886	+2.93%
1990	951	+0.89%
1999	1,053	+1.14%
2007	1,412	+3.74%
2012	1,549	+1.87%
2017	1,691	+1.77%
2023	1,897	+1.93%
Source: INSEE

== See also ==
- Communes of the Charente-Maritime department
