= La Jarrie =

- Commune
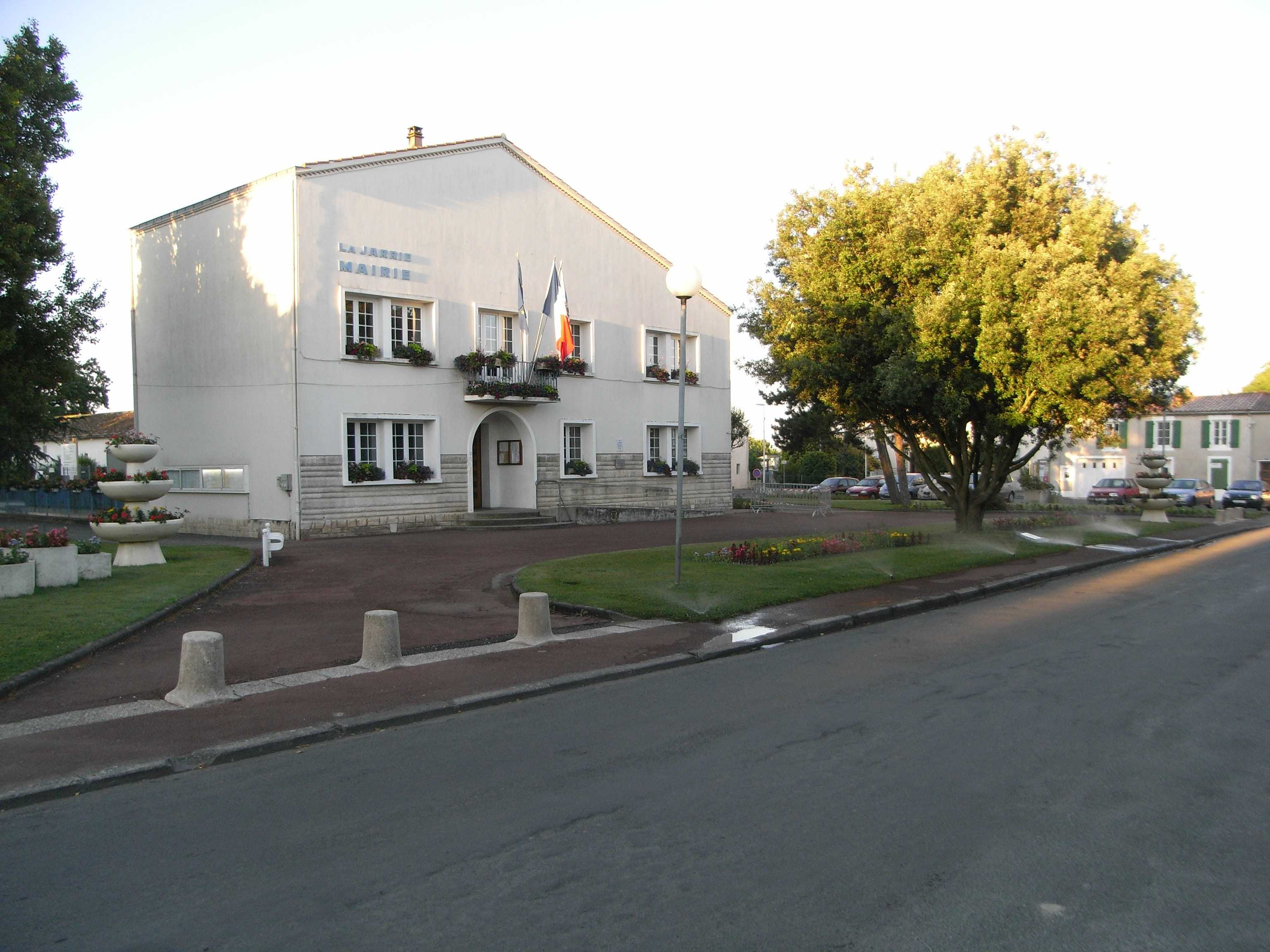
- Town hall

- Coat of arms
- Location of La Jarrie
- Location within France Location within Nouvelle-Aquitaine
- Coordinates: 46°07′45″N 1°00′31″W
- Country: France
- Region: Nouvelle-Aquitaine
- Department: Charente-Maritime
- Arrondissement: La Rochelle
- Canton: La Jarrie
- Intercommunality: CA La Rochelle

Government
  - Mayor (2020–2026): David Baudon
- Area^{1}: 9.45 km^{2} (3.65 sq mi)
- Elevation: 37 m (121 ft)
- Highest elevation: 43 m (141 ft)
- Lowest elevation: 11 m (36 ft)
- Population (2023): 3,458
  - Density: 366/km^{2} (948/sq mi)
- Time zone: UTC+01:00 (CET)
  - Summer (DST): UTC+02:00 (CEST)
- INSEE/Postal code: 17194 /17220
- ^{1} French Land Register data, which excludes lakes, ponds, glaciers > 1 km^{2} (0.386 sq mi or 247 acres) and river estuaries.

La Jarrie (French pronunciation: [la ʒaʁi]) is a commune in the Charente-Maritime department in southwestern France.

== Geography ==
The commune consists of the small town La Jarrie and parts of the hamlets Grolleau, Chassagné and Puyvineux.

== Population ==
Historical population
Year	Pop.	±% p.a.
1968	1,056	—
1975	1,596	+6.08%
1982	2,235	+4.93%
1990	2,413	+0.96%
1999	2,653	+1.06%
2007	2,798	+0.67%
2012	2,917	+0.84%
2017	3,265	+2.28%
2023	3,458	+0.96%
Source: INSEE

== See also ==
- Communes of the Charente-Maritime department
