= Canton of La Jarrie =

Coordinates: 46°08′N 1°00′W

La Jarrie
- Canton
- Interactive map of La Jarrie
- Country: France
- Region: Nouvelle-Aquitaine
- Department: Charente-Maritime
- No. of communes: {{{nbcomm}}}
- Area: 155.57 km^{2} (60.07 sq mi)
- Population (2023): 28,029
  - Density: 180.17/km^{2} (466.64/sq mi)
- INSEE code: 1706

The Canton of La Jarrie is a canton of the Charente-Maritime department, in France. Since the French canton reorganisation which came into effect in March 2015, the canton consists of the following 14 communes:

- Anais
- Bouhet
- Bourgneuf
- Clavette
- Croix-Chapeau
- La Jarne
- La Jarrie
- Montroy
- Saint-Christophe
- Sainte-Soulle
- Saint-Médard-d'Aunis
- Saint-Rogatien
- Thairé
- Vérines

== Population history ==
Historical population
Year	Pop.	±% p.a.
2013	23,928	—
2018	26,562	+2.11%
Source: INSEE

== See also ==
- Cantons of the Charente-Maritime department
