= Maxime Bono =

French politician

Member of the Parliament
- In office 30 March 1999 – 19 June 2012
- Preceded by: Michel Crépeau
- Succeeded by: Olivier Falorni
- Constituency: Charente-Maritime (1st)

Mayor of La Rochelle
- In office 19 April 1999 – 5 April 2014
- Preceded by: Michel Crépeau
- Succeeded by: Jean-François Fountaine

President of the Agglomeration community of La Rochelle
- In office January 2000 – April 2014
- Succeeded by: Jean-François Fountaine
- Constituency: Charente-Maritime

General councillor
- In office 30 March 1992 – 27 April 1999
- Preceded by: Pierre Garang
- Succeeded by: Denis Leroy
- Constituency: La Rochelle-6

Personal details
- Born: 1 November 1947 (age 78) Algiers, Algeria
- Party: Socialist Party
- Education: University of Toulouse
- Profession: Tax inspector
- Website: http://maximebono.com/

Maxime Bono (born 1 November 1947 in Algiers, Algeria) is a French politician and a member of the Socialist Party. He has been mayor of La Rochelle from April 1999 to April 2014, president of the Agglomeration community of La Rochelle from January 2000 to April 2014 and an MP of the Charente-Maritime's 1st constituency from April 1999 until June 2012. During his two mandates, he was a member of the Socialist, Radical, Citizen and Miscellaneous Left parliamentary group.

== Legal studies and work ==
Maxime Bono studied public law in the Law and Economics Faculty of the University of Toulouse, graduating with a licence in 1971. He has been a tax inspector between 1972 and 1982.

In 1983, he became cultural councillor of the municipality of La Rochelle. In 1985, he became representative in the cabinet of Michel Crépeau, then mayor of La Rochelle. In 1986, he became chief of the staff of Michel Crépeau.

== Political career (1975–2012) ==
=== Early period (1975–1999) ===
He has been a member of the Socialist party since 1974.

He has been a first deputy mayor of La Rochelle during ten years (1989–1999). He was in charge of cultural affairs during this period. From 1993 to 1999, he has been a vice president of the Community of cities of La Rochelle. He was in charge of economics during this period. From 1992 to 1999, he has represented the La Rochelle 6th canton in the General Council of Charente-Maritime.

From 1995 to 1999, he has been a president of the municipality-owned company of the public transportation of La Rochelle.

=== Mayor of La Rochelle (1999−2014) and MP (1999−2012) ===
A mayor of La Rochelle since 1971, an MP of the Charente-Maritime's 1st constituency (1973–1993, again from 1997), a former Minister (1981–1986) during the first presidential mandate of François Mitterrand, Michel Crépeau died in Paris on 30 March 1999, after a heart attack which had arisen few days earlier during a parliamentary session of the National Assembly.

In April 1999, Maxime Bono succeeded him as a mayor of La Rochelle, a president of the Community of cities of La Rochelle and an MP of the Charente-Maritime's 1st constituency (the nine cantons of La Rochelle and the two cantons of the Île de Ré). In January 2000, the Community of cities turned into the Agglomeration community of La Rochelle, which currently groups together eighteen towns and villages of Aunis.

On 27 April 1999, he resigned as a general councillor of La Rochelle-6 because of the law of the accumulation of mandates ("Cumul des mandats").

However, he didn't seek a third parliamentary mandate in 2012. In the National Assembly, he sat as a member in the committee of the sustainable development and spatial planning. Olivier Falorni (Divers Gauche) succeeded him as an MP of the Charente-Maritime's 1st constituency.

In 2013, he decided not to seek a further mayoral mandate, hinting at his defeat at the 2012 parliamentary elections as one of the reasons motivating his decision. Following the 2014 French municipal elections, Maxime Bono was succeeded as mayor of La Rochelle and President of the La Rochelle Agglomeration Community by Jean-François Fountaine (Divers Gauche).

== Elections (2001-2008) ==
=== Municipal elections ===
In the 2001 municipal elections, Maxime Bono's miscellaneous left list largely overtook the absolute majority from the first round (67.36%, 15,190 votes). He even polled more than his predecessor Michel Crépeau in 1995 (58.02%).

In the 2008 municipal elections, his miscellaneous left list again largely overtook the absolute majority from the first round. Despite the competition of six lists and a lower percentage than in 2001, his municipal list polled 58.93% (15.400 votes) and got 41 of the 49 seats.

=== Parliamentary elections ===
The first constituency of the Charente-Maritime consists of La Rochelle, some of its surrounding towns and villages (Dompierre-sur-Mer, Esnandes, L'Houmeau, Lagord, Marsilly, Nieul-sur-Mer, Périgny, Puilboreau, Saint-Xandre) and the ten municipalities of the Île de Ré (Ars-en-Ré, La Couarde-sur-Mer, La Flotte, Le Bois-Plage-en-Ré, Les Portes-en-Ré, Loix, Rivedoux-Plage, Saint-Clément-des-Baleines, Saint-Martin-de-Ré, Sainte-Marie-de-Ré).

==== La Rochelle in 2002 ====
Polling 37.12% (21,138 votes) in the first round, Maxime Bono largely overtook the UMP candidate Catherine Normandin (27.63%, 15,731 votes). In the run-off, he was elected as MP with 53.02% (28,725 votes).

He attained his highest score in La Rochelle in the first round (41.45%, 12,027 votes) and in the run-off (57.74%, 15,834 votes). Except for Dompierre-sur-Mer where he was overtaken by four votes by Catherine Normandin, he headed in the first round in all the surrounding towns and villages of La Rochelle. Except for Lagord and Marsilly, he got the absolute majority in the run-off in all the surrounding towns and villages of La Rochelle. In the first round, he arrived in second position in the ten municipalities of the Île de Ré; his lowest score was in La Couarde-sur-Mer (21.71%). In the second round, he was defeated by Catherine Normandin in the ten municipalities of the Île de Ré; his lowest score was in Les Portes-en-Ré (32.08%).

==== La Rochelle in 2007 ====
Polling 40.77% (23,928 votes) in the first round, Maxime Bono overtook the UMP candidate Dominique Morvant, then general councillor of La Rochelle-4 (35.95%, 21,099 votes). In the run-off, he was re-elected as MP with 55.05% (32,345 votes). Compared to 2002, he slightly increased his parliamentary score.

He attained his highest score in Esnandes in the first round (45.49%) and in the run-off (62.84%). In La Rochelle, he polled 45.14% (13.120 votes) in the first round and 60.69% (17.667 votes) in the run-off. Except for Marsilly in the first round and the run-off, he headed in the first round and got the absolute majority in the run-off in all the surrounding towns and villages of La Rochelle. In the first round, he arrived in second position in the ten municipalities of the Île de Ré; like in 2002, his lowest score was in La Couarde-sur-Mer (23.11%). In the run-off, he was defeated by Dominique Morvant in the ten municipalities of the Île de Ré; his lowest score was in Loix (32.44%).

=== Former local mandates ===
- President of the Community of cities of La Rochelle: April 1999-January 2000
- General councillor of La Rochelle-6 : 30 March 1992 – 27 April 1999
- Mayor of La Rochelle : 19 April 1999 - 5 April 2014
- President of the Agglomeration community of La Rochelle : January 2000 - April 2014

=== National mandate ===
- MP of the Charente-Maritime's 1st constituency (30 March 1999−19 June 2012) : Socialist, Radical, Citizen and Miscellaneous Left parliamentary group, member of the committee of the sustainable development and spatial planning
