= Benoît Biteau =

French politician (born 1967)

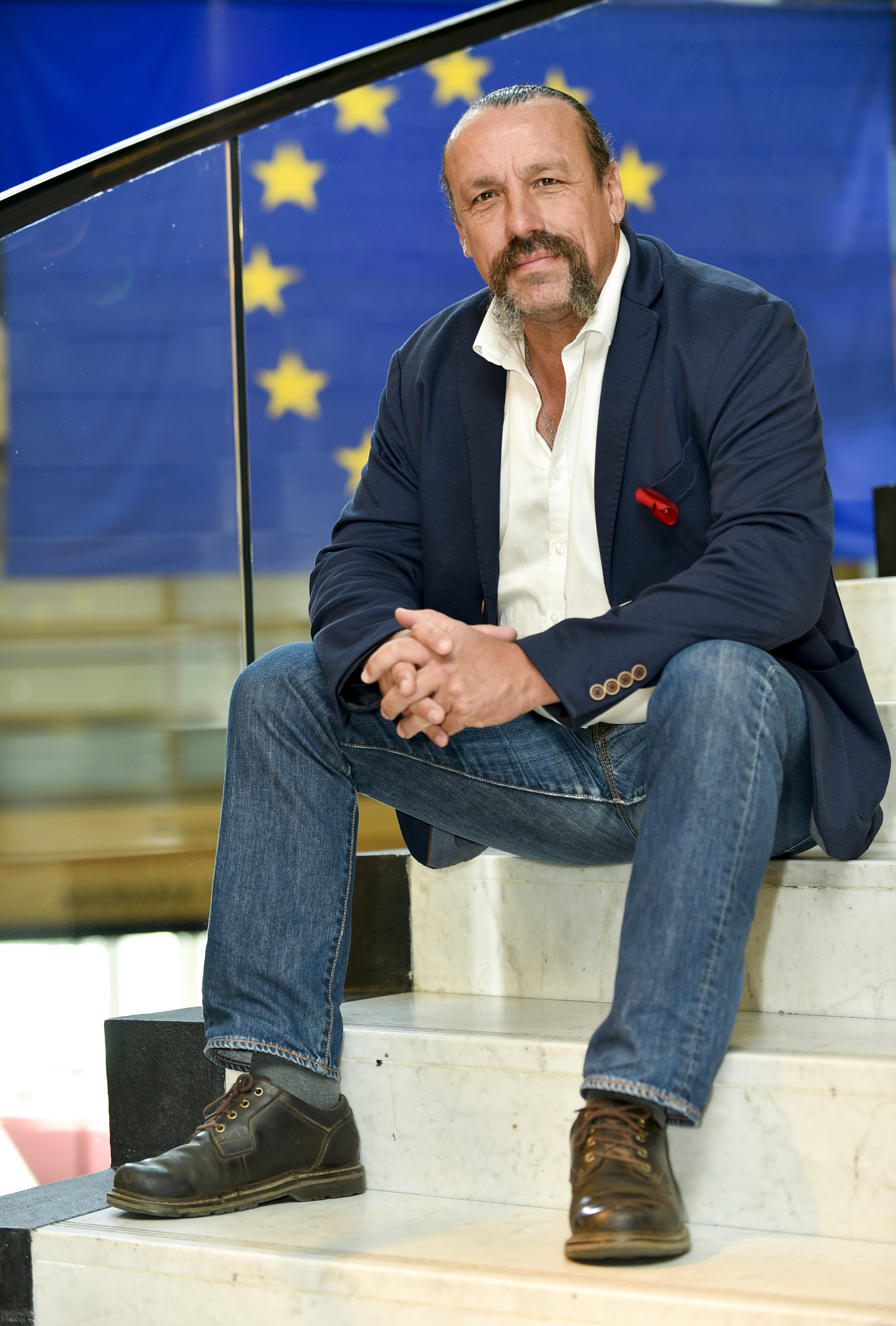

Member of the National Assembly for Charente-Maritime's 2nd constituency
- Incumbent
- Assumed office 8 July 2024
- Preceded by: Anne-Laure Babault

Member of the European Parliament
- In office 2 July 2019 – 15 July 2024
- Constituency: France

Personal details
- Born: Benoît Pierre Biteau; 7 April 1967 (age 59) Royan, France
- Party: Independent
- Other political affiliations: Radical Party of the Left (1985–2017)
- Profession: Farmer · Agronomist · Politician

Benoît Pierre Biteau (French pronunciation: [bənwa bito]; born 7 April 1967) is a French farmer, agronomist and politician who was elected the deputy for the 2nd constituency of Charente-Maritime in the National Assembly in the 2024 legislative election. He ran under The Ecologists (LÉ) banner, part of the New Popular Front (NFP) alliance.

Biteau was previously elected a Member of the European Parliament (MEP) in 2019 at place 11 on the Europe Ecology – The Greens list. He failed to win reelection in 2024 and chose to run for the National Assembly a month later.

He also held a seat in the Regional Council of Poitou-Charentes (2010–2015) and its successor, the Regional Council of Nouvelle-Aquitaine (2016–2021), as well as one of the council's vice-presidencies during his first five-year term.

== Biography ==
Born into a farming family, Benoît Biteau holds a BTS in plant technology and another in water management. He first worked as the director of the engineering department at a company that sells irrigation equipment, before earning a degree in agricultural engineering from Bordeaux Sciences Agro in 1997.

After taking over the family farm in 2007 in the small town of Sablonceaux, in Charente-Maritime, he shifted the farm’s focus from intensive corn cultivation to raising local breeds of livestock and began replanting trees to improve water retention. In 2009, he received the National Sustainable Agriculture Award

He is also a cyclist and was ranked in the first category for a while.

He advocates for Smallholding and Agroecology, respect for natural resources and wild and domestic heritage—such as water, heirloom seeds, genetic diversity, and the preservation of ancient local breeds, as well as farm-saved seeds, soils, and terroirs.

France 3 Nouvelle Aquitaine describes him as a “communication virtuoso”: “On his Facebook page titled ‘Benoît Biteau, Farmer, Agronomist, and Resistance Fighter,’ he runs a public group that ‘aims to support organic farmers who sometimes feel isolated in the face of farmers who follow the dominant, productivity-driven, chemical-based model, as well as politicians, government agencies, and lobby groups.’” The agricultural engineer is also active on a blog titled “Ferme Val de Seudre Identi’Terre,” a farm that won the national sustainable agriculture award in 2009”.
