= List of shipwrecks in February 1839 =

The list of shipwrecks in February 1839 includes ships sunk, foundered, wrecked, grounded, or otherwise lost during February 1839.

== 1 February ==
List of shipwrecks: 1 February 1839
Ship	State	Description
Eugene Elise	France	The ship was driven ashore at Marsilly, Charente-Maritime. She was on a voyage from Paimbœuf, Loire-Inférieure to Gloucester, United Kingdom.
Reward	United Kingdom	The ship was driven ashore at Felixtowe, Suffolk. She was later refloated and taken into Harwich, Essex.
St. Agnes	United Kingdom	The ship ran aground on the North Ridge, in the Bristol Channel. She was later refloated.

== 2 February ==
List of shipwrecks: 2 February 1839
Ship	State	Description
Argo	Prussia	The ship ran aground off Helsingør, Denmark. She was on a voyage from Königsberg to Hull, Yorkshire, United Kingdom. She was refloated and put into Copenhagen, Denmark for repairs.
Commerce	United Kingdom	The ship was wrecked on the Haisborough Sands, in the North Sea off the coast of Norfolk. She was on a voyage from London to South Shields, County Durham.
Elizabeth and Mary	United Kingdom	The ship struck a sunken rock whilst on a voyage from South Shields to Leith, Lothian. She consequently put back to South Shields.
Farmer	United Kingdom	The ship was driven ashore at Hartlepool, County Durham. She was on a voyage from Newburgh, Fife to Hartlepool. Farmer was later refloated and taken into Hartlepool.
Good Design	United Kingdom	The ship was wrecked on "Haby Island".
Jonge Petrus	Belgium	The ship departed from Antwerp for the Firth of Forth. No further trace, presumed foundered in the North Sea with the loss of all hands.
Marjory	United Kingdom	The ship was wrecked on "Haby Island".
Recovery	United Kingdom	The ship was wrecked on the Nash Sands, Glamorgan. Her crew were rescued.
Scotland	United Kingdom	The ship was driven ashore at Sandy Hook, New Jersey, United States. She was on a voyage from Liverpool, Lancashire to New York, United States. Scotland was later refloated and proceeded to New York, where she arrived on 2 February.

== 3 February ==
List of shipwrecks: 3 February 1839
Ship	State	Description
Abeona	United Kingdom	The ship was driven ashore near Dove Point. She was on a voyage from Saint John, New Brunswick, British North America to Liverpool, Lancashire. Abeona was refloated and taken into Liverpool.
Anstruther	United Kingdom	The ship struck Whitby Rock and sank. Her crew were rescued.
Cygnet	United Kingdom	The ship was driven ashore near Redcar, Yorkshire. She was later refloated.
Galatea	Portuguese Navy	The stores ship caught fire at Lisbon. She was scuttled by HMS Donegal, HMS Scylla (both Royal Navy) and some French Navy ships.
Raby Castle	United Kingdom	The ship was holed by her anchor and sank at Whitehaven, Cumberland. She was on a voyage from the Duddon Estuary to Whitehaven.

== 4 February ==
List of shipwrecks: 4 February 1839
Ship	State	Description
Betsey	(United Kingdom of Great Britain and Ireland) British North America	The ship was wrecked at Kildoney, County Donegal. She was on a voyage from Saint John, New Brunswick, to Ballyshannon, County Donegal.
Brigand	United Kingdom	The ship ran aground on the Cross Sand, in the North Sea off the coast of Norfolk. She was on a voyage from Belfast, County Antrim to Newcastle upon Tyne, Northumberland. Brigand was later refloated and resumed her voyage.
Frau Margaretha	Kingdom of Hanover	The ship was driven ashore at Delfzijl, Groningen, United Kingdom of the Netherlands. She was on a voyage from London, United Kingdom to Leer. Frau Margaretha was refloated and taken into Delfzijl.
Griffon	United Kingdom	The ship was wrecked at Mazatlán, Mexico. She was on a voyage from Canton, China to San Blas Atempa, Mexico.
Intrepide	France	The ship was in collision with Angelina (France) and sank 6 leagues (18 nautical miles (33 km)) north west of Liverpool, Lancashire, United Kingdom. Her crew were rescued. She was on a voyage from Liverpool to Senegal.
James and Thomas	United Kingdom	The ship was run aground on the Shipwash Sand, in the North Sea off the coast of Suffolk. She was on a voyage from Hull, Yorkshire to New York. James and Thomas was refloated and put back to Hull.
Sarah	United Kingdom	The ship was driven ashore on Barry Island, Glamorgan. She was on a voyage from Chepstow, Monmouthshire to Belfast, County Antrim. Sarah was later refloated and put into Cardiff, Glamorgan.
Star	United Kingdom	The schooner was driven ashore at Souter Point, County Durham. Her crew were rescued. She was on a voyage from Sunderland, County Durham to Aberdeen.
Trial	United Kingdom	The ship was driven ashore at Margam Sands, Glamorgan. She was on a voyage from Rouen, Seine-Inférieure, France to Swansea, Glamorgan. Trial capsized on 14 February and was wrecked.
William Rufus	United Kingdom	The ship was abandoned in the Atlantic Ocean. Her crew were rescued by Isaac Newton (United Kingdom). William Rufus was on a voyage from Saint John, New Brunswick, British North America to Cork.

== 5 February ==
List of shipwrecks: 5 February 1839
Ship	State	Description
Augustine	United Kingdom	The ship was driven ashore at Havre de Grâce, Seine-Inférieure, France. She was on a voyage from Falmouth, Cornwall to Rouen, Seine-Inférieure.
Cornelia	Netherlands	The ship foundered in the North Sea off Egmond aan Zee, North Holland. Her crew were rescued. She was on a voyage from Amsterdam, North Holland to London, United Kingdom.
Emmeline	United Kingdom	The ship was wrecked on the Hogsty Reef. She was on a voyage from St. Jago de Cuba, Cuba to Liverpool, Lancashire.
Grace	United Kingdom	The sloop was driven ashore and sank at Rhosilli, Glamorgan. Her crew were rescued. She was on a voyage from Bridgwater, Somerset to Liverpool.
Plenty	United Kingdom	The ship ran aground in the River Usk, capsized and was severely damaged. She was on a voyage from Newport, Monmouthshire to Newcastle upon Tyne, Northumberland.

== 6 February ==
List of shipwrecks: 6 February 1839
Ship	State	Description
Charles	France	The brig was wrecked on the Scarweather Sands, in the Bristol Channel off the coast of Glamorgan, United Kingdom. Her crew were rescued by the Porthcawl pilot boat. She was on a voyage from Saint John, New Brunswick, British North America to Gloucester.
Falcon	United Kingdom	The schooner was driven ashore at the "Pip de Tabac". She was later refloated.
Mary	United Kingdom	The ship was driven ashore and wrecked in the Dardanelles. She was on a voyage from Cardiff, Glamorgan to Constantinople, Ottoman Empire.

== 7 February ==
List of shipwrecks: 7 February 1839
Ship	State	Description
Charles	United Kingdom	The ship was wrecked at Porthcawl, Glamorgan. Her crew were rescued. She was on a voyage from New Brunswick, British North America to Gloucester.
Faderneslandet	Russia	The ship was driven ashore on the Goodwin Sands, Kent, United Kingdom. She was on a voyage from South Shields, County Durham, United Kingdom to Messina, Sicily. Faderneslander was refloated and anchored in The Downs. She was subsequently towed to the River Thames.
Godt Haab	Norway	The ship ran aground on the Goodwin Sands, Kent, United Kingdom. She was refloated but consequently sank. Her crew were rescued. Goed Haab was on a voyage from Bergen to Santander, Spain.
Hercules	United Kingdom	The ship was wrecked at Leasowe, Cheshire with the loss of all hands. She was on a voyage from Maryport, Cumberland to Sierra Leone.
Mary	Malta	The ship was wrecked in the Dardanelles.
Ocean	United Kingdom	The ship was driven ashore 2 nautical miles (3.7 km) west of Dover, Kent. She was on a voyage from Penryn, Cornwall to London. Ocean was later refloated and resumed her voyage.
Partizan	United Kingdom	The ship ran aground on the Whitburn Stewl. She was later refloated and taken into South Shields.
Transit	United Kingdom	The ship was wrecked near Hellsmouth, Caernarfonshire. She was on a voyage from Savannah, Georgia, United States to Liverpool, Lancashire.
William Ritchie	United Kingdom	The ship was abandoned in the Atlantic Ocean. All on board were rescued by Wakefield. William Ritchie was on a voyage from Belfast, County Antrim to New York, United States.

== 8 February ==
List of shipwrecks: 8 February 1839
Ship	State	Description
Commerce	United Kingdom	The ship was driven ashore at Beaumaris, Anglesey. she was on a voyage from Caernarfon to Dundalk, County Louth. Commerce was refloated and put into Bangor, Caernarfonshire for repairs.
Edinburgh	United Kingdom	The ship was wrecked west of St. Govan's Head, Pembrokeshire with the loss of seven lives. She was on a voyage from New Orleans, Louisiana, United States to Milford Haven, Pembrokeshire.
Fortitude	United Kingdom	The ship was driven ashore and wrecked near St Alban's Head, Dorset.
Gardiner	United Kingdom	The ship ran aground at Charleston, South Carolina, United States. She was on a voyage from Liverpool, Lancashire to Charleston.
Shannon	United Kingdom	The ship was driven ashore and wrecked at Ballywalter, County Down. She was on a voyage from Whitehaven, Cumberland to Dunkirk, Nord, France.

== 9 February ==
List of shipwrecks: 9 February 1839
Ship	State	Description
Lord Melville Packet	United Kingdom	The ship departed from Falmouth, Cornwall for Halifax, Nova Scotia, British North America. No further trace, presumed foundered with the loss of all hands.
Mary	United Kingdom	The ship was driven ashore and wrecked at the Old Head of Kinsale, County Cork. Her crew were rescued. She was on a voyage from Liverpool, Lancashire to Limerick.

== 10 February ==
List of shipwrecks: 10 February 1839
Ship	State	Description
Durant	United States	The ship was wrecked on the coast of Tabasco, Mexico.
Victoria	United Kingdom	The schooner was driven ashore in Jack's Sound. She was on a voyage from Cephalonia, United States of the Ionian Islands to Liverpool, Lancashire.

== 11 February ==
List of shipwrecks: 11 February 1839
Ship	State	Description
Avon	United Kingdom	The ship departed from Liverpool, Lancashire for Swansea, Glamorgan. No further trace, presumed foundered with the loss of all hands.
Barbara	United Kingdom	The brig was run down and sunk in the North Sea off the coast of Suffolk by the brig Derwent (United Kingdom). Her crew were rescued.
Timandra	United Kingdom	The ship was wrecked at the mouth of the River Foyle. She was on a voyage from Lima, Peru to Liverpool.

== 12 February ==
List of shipwrecks: 12 February 1839
Ship	State	Description
Chinqua	Kingdom of the Two Sicilies	The ship was driven ashore and wrecked on Gotland, Sweden. She was on a voyage from Messina to a Russian port.
Equity	United Kingdom	The ship ran aground on the Barber Sand, in the North Sea off the coast of Norfolk.
Prince Regent	United Kingdom	The ship was wrecked at "Ulloa", British Honduras. Her crew were rescued. She was on a voyage from "Ulloa" to Cork.

== 13 February ==
List of shipwrecks: 13 February 1839
Ship	State	Description
Edinburgh	United Kingdom	The barque struck the Crow Rock, in the Bristol Channel off the coast of Pembrokeshire and was wrecked with the loss of seven of the twenty people on board. She was on a voyage from New Orleans, Louisiana, United States to Liverpool, Lancashire.
James or Jane	United Kingdom	The ship was wrecked at Mostyn, Flintshire with the loss of two of her crew.
Little Kate	United Kingdom	The ship was wrecked in the Hilbre Islands, Cheshire. Her crew were rescued.
Lady Downshire	United Kingdom	The sloop foundered off the Copeland Islands, County Down. Her crew were rescued, but her captain subsequently died. She was on a voyage from Dundalk, County Louth to Campbeltown, Argyllshire.
Madras	United Kingdom	The ship foundered off the mouth of the River Shannon with the loss of all hands.
Mary Bruce	United Kingdom	The ship was wrecked on a reef off Trujillo, Honduras on January 13th. Crew made Trujillo on January 22nd. Her crew were rescued.
Semiramis	(United Kingdom) HM Indian Navy	The unarmed paddle sloop was wrecked 12 nautical miles (22 km) from "Segal Point". She was on a voyage from the Indus River to Bombay, India.
Venus	United Kingdom	The ship was in collision with another vessel off Flamborough Head, Yorkshire. She was abandoned the next day. Her crew were rescued.

== 14 February ==
List of shipwrecks: 14 February 1839
Ship	State	Description
Deux Freres	France	The ship ran aground on the Sandend, in the North Sea off the coast of County Durham, United Kingdom. She was refloated but consequently sank.
Galahad	United Kingdom	The ship was abandoned off Robin Hoods Bay, Yorkshire. Her crew were rescued. She was on a voyage from South Shields, County Durham to London.
Mary Kimball	United Kingdom	The ship ran aground at Mauritius. She was refloated two days later and taken into port.
Mersey	United Kingdom	The ship was driven onto the Middle Sand, in the Humber. She was later refloated and taken into Hull, Yorkshire. Mersey was on a voyage from Saint John, New Brunswick, British North America to Hull.
Success	United Kingdom	The ship capsized off St Abb's Head, Berwickshire and was abandoned. Her crew were rescued. She was on a voyage from King's Lynn, Norfolk to Inverkeithing, Fife.
Trini	France	The ship ran aground on the Margam Sands, in the Bristol Channel off the coast of Glamorgan, United Kingdom. She capsized and was wrecked. Trini was on a voyage from Rouen, Seine-Inférieure to Swansea, Glamorgan.
Tuscany	Kingdom of the Two Sicilies	The ship ran aground at Gibraltar. She was on a voyage from Palermo to New York, United States. Tuscany was refloated.

== 15 February ==
List of shipwrecks: 15 February 1839
Ship	State	Description
Commerce	United Kingdom	The brig was wrecked at Alexandria, Egypt. She was on a voyage from Liverpool, Lancashire to Alexandria.
Felix Destino	Portugal	The schooner was wrecked on the Ribble Banks near Southport, Lancashire with the loss of all six crew. She was on a voyage from Terceira Island, Azores to Southport, Lancashire, United Kingdom.
Hope	United Kingdom	The ship struck the pier and sank at Maryport, Cumberland. She was on a voyage from Dublin to Maryport.
Swallow	United Kingdom	The ship was destroyed by fire in the River Thames at Purfleet, Essex.
West Indian	(United Kingdom of Great Britain and Ireland) Grenada	The sloop was driven ashore and wrecked at "Santuna".

== 16 February ==
List of shipwrecks: 16 February 1839
Ship	State	Description
Gustav Adolph	Belgium	The ship was driven ashore in the Scheldt. She was on a voyage from Antwerp to Hull, Yorkshire, United Kingdom. Gustav Adolph was later refloated and resumed her voyage.
Janus	United Kingdom	The ship departed from New York, United States for Galway. No further trace, presumed foundered with the loss of all hands.
Two Gebroeders	Belgium	The ship ran aground on the Clout Bank. She was on a voyage from London, United Kingdom to Antwerp.

== 17 February ==
List of shipwrecks: 17 February 1839
Ship	State	Description
Eugenia	Danzig	The ship was driven ashore at Portsmouth, Hampshire, United Kingdom. She was refloated and proceeded on her voyage to Danzig.
Jane and Mary Ann	United Kingdom	The ship was driven ashore near Berck-sur-Mer, Pas-de-Calais, France. Her crew were rescued. She was on a voyage from Glandore, County Cork to London.
Lady Shaw Stewart	United Kingdom	The ship ran aground on the Wellington Reef, off Antigua and was damaged. She was on a voyage from Whitehaven, Cumberland to Antigua.

== 18 February ==
List of shipwrecks: 18 February 1839
Ship	State	Description
Asia	United Kingdom	The ship ran aground in Table Bay. She was on a voyage from Calcutta, India to London. Asia was later refloated.
Celerity	United Kingdom	The ship ran aground on the Foreness Rock, off Margate, Kent. She was later refloated and proceeded for the River Thames.
Mary	United Kingdom	The ship was wrecked at Kinsale, County Cork. Her crew were rescued. She was on a voyage from Liverpool, Lancashire to Limerick.
Rose	United Kingdom	The ship was driven ashore at Margate. She was on a voyage from Guernsey, Channel Islands to London. Rose was later refloated and resumed her voyage.

== 19 February ==
List of shipwrecks: 19 February 1839
Ship	State	Description
Albion	United Kingdom	The ship ran aground on the Burbo Bank, in Liverpool Bay. She was on a voyage from Liverpool, Lancashire to New Orleans, Louisiana, United States. Albion was refloated and put back to Liverpool for repairs.
Hope	United Kingdom	The ship struck the quayside and sank at Maryport, Cumberland. She was on a voyage from Dublin to Maryport.
Soho	United Kingdom	The steamship caught fire in the River Thames and was scuttled. She was on a voyage from Antwerp, Belgium to London.

== 20 February ==
List of shipwrecks: 20 February 1839
Ship	State	Description
Bee	United Kingdom	The ship was driven ashore and wrecked at Corton, Suffolk.
George Gordon	United Kingdom	The ship was driven ashore in the Shetland Islands. She was on a voyage from Alloa, Clackmannanshire to Constantinople, Ottoman Empire.

== 21 February ==
List of shipwrecks: 21 February 1839
Ship	State	Description
Aigle	France	The ship was wrecked in the Maldive Islands. Her crew were rescued.
Ann Patley	United Kingdom	The ship sprang a leak and foundered in the Atlantic Ocean 100 nautical miles (190 km) off Ouessant, Finistère, France. Her crew were rescued by Kelloe (United Kingdom). Ann Patley was on a voyage from Marseille, Bouches-du-Rhône, France to Liverpool, Lancashire.
Elizabeth and Ann	United Kingdom	The ship was driven ashore at Weymouth, Dorset. She was on a voyage from Cork to Portsmouth, Hampshire.
Frasquita	France	The ship was severely damaged in a gale north west of Mauritius. She was consequently condemned.
Harmonie	Netherlands	The ship was driven ashore and wrecked on the Sandwich Flats, Kent, United Kingdom and was wrecked. She was on a voyage from Rotterdam, South Holland to Batavia, Netherlands East Indies.
Harmony	United Kingdom	The ship was driven ashore at Weymouth.
Harriet	United Kingdom	The ship was wrecked on the Maharees with the loss of all on board. She was on a voyage from Limerick to Bristol, Gloucestershire.
John and Marion Christal	United Kingdom	The ship was wrecked at Westport, County Mayo with the loss of six of her eight crew. She was on a voyage from Liverpool, Lancashire to Ballina, County Mayo.
Lion	United Kingdom	The ship was driven ashore at Bruckless, County Donegal. Her crew were rescued.
Louisa	United Kingdom	The smack struck the pier at Dover, Kent and was wrecked. Her crew were rescued.
Mary Ann	United Kingdom	The ship was driven ashore and wrecked at Saltfleet, Lincolnshire.
Niagara	United Kingdom	The ship ran aground on the Grain Spit, in the Thames Estuary.
Recovery	United Kingdom	The ship ran aground on the Chickston Ledge, off Exmouth, Devon. She was refloated but then ran aground on the Pole Sand. Recovery was on a voyage from Newcastle upon Tyne, Northumberland to Exmouth. She was later refloated and taken into port.
Trafalgar	United Kingdom	The ship was wrecked on Green Point, Cape Town, Cape Colony with the loss of a passenger. She was on a voyage from Liverpool to New South Wales.

== 22 February ==
List of shipwrecks: 22 February 1839
Ship	State	Description
Dido	United Kingdom	The ship ran aground on the Blankenese Sand. She was on a voyage from Hamburg to London.
Durham	United Kingdom	The ship ran aground on the Blankenese Sand. She was on a voyage from Hamburg to Hull, Yorkshire.
Eyre	United Kingdom	The ship was wrecked on the Jadder Bank, in the North Sea. She was on a voyage from Østerisør, Norway to a Scottish port.
Heinrich Johann	Hamburg	The ship ran aground on the Blankenese Sand. She was on a voyage from Hamburg to Havana, Captaincy General of Cuba.
Louisa Hannah	United Kingdom	The ship was wrecked on the Western Rocks, Isles of Scilly with the loss of all hands. She was on a voyage from Lisbon, Portugal to Poole, Dorset.

== 23 February ==
List of shipwrecks: 23 February 1839
Ship	State	Description
Duarte II	Portugal	The ship was driven ashore a wreck on "St. Anns Island", Brazil. Duarte II was on a voyage from Porto to Maranhão, Brazil.
Ebenezer	United Kingdom	The ship was wrecked at Liverpool, Lancashire. She was on a voyage from Douglas, Isle of Man to Liverpool.
Eva Suornost	Danzig	The ship ran aground on the Nordergatt. She was on a voyage from Danzig to Liebau, Prussia. Eva Suornost was refloated on 25 February and put back to Danzig.
Maria Carlotta	Portugal	The ship was driven ashore and wrecked at Ceará, Brazil.
Verbena	United Kingdom	The ship was driven ashore at Hendon, County Durham. She was on a voyage from Wells-next-the-Sea, Norfolk to Sunderland, County Durham. Verbena was later refloated and towed into Sunderland.

== 24 February ==
List of shipwrecks: 24 February 1839
Ship	State	Description
Stephen Chapman	(United Kingdom of Great Britain and Ireland) Jamaica	The ship was wrecked on a reef off St. Anne's Bay, Jamaica. Her crew were rescued.

== 25 February ==
List of shipwrecks: 25 February 1839
Ship	State	Description
Albree	United States	The ship ran aground on a reef in the Dry Tortugas and was severely damaged. She was on a voyage from Saint John, New Brunswick, British North America to Boston, Massachusetts. Albree was later refloated.
Brunsick Packet	United Kingdom	The ship was driven ashore by ice and damaged at Glückstadt, Duchy of Holstein.

== 26 February ==
List of shipwrecks: 26 February 1839
Ship	State	Description
Loulis	Greece	The steamship foundered off Cap de Creus, Catalonia, Spain. She was on a voyage from Port-Vendres, Pyrénées-Orientales, France to Valencia, Spain.

== 27 February ==
List of shipwrecks: 27 February 1938
Ship	State	Description
Sisters	United Kingdom	The ship was driven ashore at Wells-next-the-Sea, Norfolk. She was on a voyage from Goole, Yorkshire to Ramsgate, Kent.
Winner	United Kingdom	The ship was driven ashore on Sapientza, Greece. She was on a voyage from Corfu to Constantinople, Ottoman Empire.

== 28 February ==
List of shipwrecks: 28 February 1839
Ship	State	Description
Acorn	United Kingdom	The ship capsized and sank off Tory Island, County Donegal with the loss of allhands. She was on a voyage from Sligo to Glasgow, Renfrewshire.
Albanian	United Kingdom	The ship was driven ashore at Patras, Greece. She was on a voyage from Vostizza, Greece to Liverpool, Lancashire.
Cygnet	United Kingdom	The barque was driven ashore at St. Joseph, Florida Territory.
Eliza	United Kingdom	The ship was driven ashore at Ryde, Isle of Wight. She was on a voyage from Southampton, Hampshire to Sunderland, County Durham.
Independence	United States	The ship was driven ashore crewless at St. Joseph.
Leila	United States	The ship was driven ashore at St. Joseph.
Lexington	United States	The ship was driven ashore at St. Joseph.
Sally Ann	United States	The schooner was driven ashore at St. Joseph.
W. Duffins	United States	The schooner was driven ashore at St. Joseph.

== Unknown date ==
List of shipwrecks: Unknown date in February 1839
Ship	State	Description
Alert	United Kingdom	The ship foundered in the Irish Sea with the loss of all hands. She was on a voyage from Cardiff, Glamorgan to Waterford. Part of the vessel washed up at Waterford on 22 February.
Ann or Anne	United Kingdom	The ship was abandoned in the Atlantic Ocean on or before 23 February.
Ardito Macedone	Flag unknown	The ship sank at Zante, United States of the Ionian Islands before 15 February. She was bound for Antwerp, Belgium.
Countess of Dunmore	United Kingdom	The ship was driven ashore in the Bosphorus. She was later refloated.
Fanny	(United Kingdom of Great Britain and Ireland) Van Diemen's Land	The schooner was wrecked near Cape Bernouilli, South Australia.
Gesina	Bremen	The ship was driven ashore at Heilingenhafen, Duchy of Holstein. She was on a voyage from Bremen to Stettin. Gesina was refloated some days later and put into Fehmarn for repairs.
Helen	United Kingdom	The ship foundered in the North Sea off Hartlepool, County Durham.
Jonge Johanna	Belgium	The ship was driven ashore at Vlissingen, Zeeland, Netherlands. Her crew were rescued. She was on a voyage from Antwerp to London, United Kingdom.
Kelly Castle	United Kingdom	The ship was wrecked on the Louisa Shoals. Her crew were rescued.
Kelpie	United Kingdom	The ship was driven ashore at Newton-by-the-Sea, Northumberland. She was later refloated.
Mary	United Kingdom	The ship ran aground on the Windward Bank, where she remained for several days. She was on a voyage from Liverpool, Lancashire to Berbice, British Honduras. Mary was later refloated; she arrived at Berbice on 15 February.
Nehemiah	United Kingdom	The ship ran aground and was wrecked on a reef off Bermuda before 6 February. Her crew were rescued. She was on a voyage from St. Stephen's, New Brunswick, British North America to Jamaica.
New York	United Kingdom	The brig was abandoned in the Atlantic Ocean on or before 23 February.
