= Olivier Falorni =

French politician (born 1972)

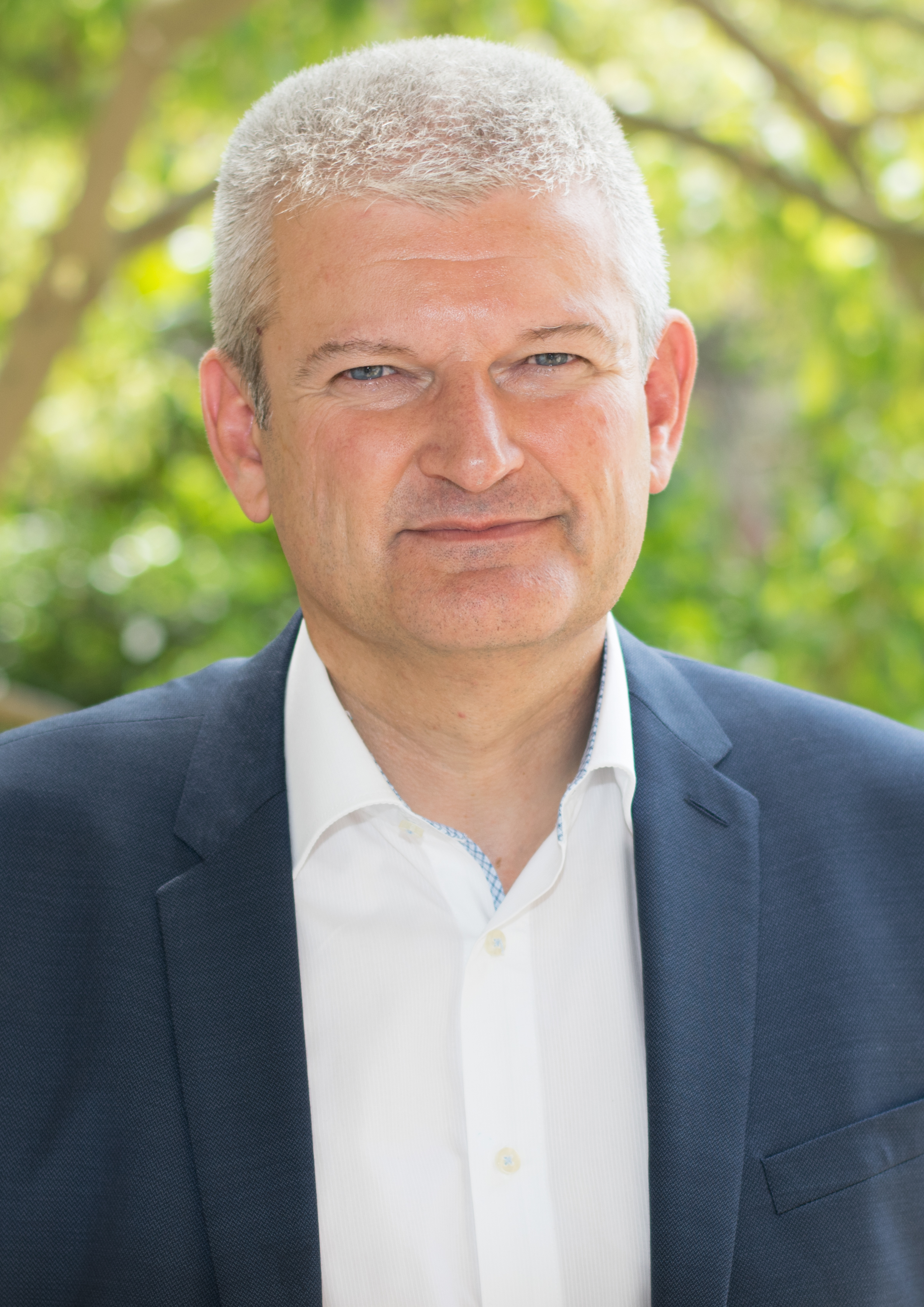
- Portrait, 2017

Member of the National Assembly for Charente-Maritime's 1st constituency
- Incumbent
- Assumed office 20 June 2012
- Preceded by: Maxime Bono

Personal details
- Born: 27 March 1972 (age 54) Rochefort, France
- Party: Radical Party of the Left
- Other political affiliations: Socialist Party (1999–2012); Miscellaneous left (2012–2017); Radical Movement (2017–2019)
- Education: Lycée Jean-Dautet
- Alma mater: University of Bordeaux
- Profession: High school teacher

Olivier Falorni (French pronunciation: [ɔlivje falɔʁni]; born 27 March 1972) is a French politician who was elected to the National Assembly on 17 June 2012, representing La Rochelle in the 1st constituency of the Charente-Maritime department. He was reelected in 2017 and again in 2022 and 2024.

== Early life ==
Falorni was born in Rochefort, Charente-Maritime on 27 March 1972, the son of a school teacher and an employee in the Social Security system. The Falorni family fled Fascist Italy in the Interwar period and settled in Charente-Maritime in Laleu, a neighborhood of La Rochelle. Falorni's grandfather, Gino Falorni, was a teacher and was a major figure in the local basketball team, where he served as a player, captain and coach between 1935 and 1954.

After graduating from lycée Jean-Dautet in La Rochelle, Falorni enrolled at the University of Bordeaux, where he graduated in 1995 with a Degree of in-Depth Studies in Contemporary History. Falorni got his first teaching job in 1997 and prior to his election, was working as a history and geography teacher at the Lycée professionnel Pierre Doriole in La Rochelle.

== Early political career ==
In 1998 Falorni attended the summer school of the Socialist Party in La Rochelle. According to Falorni, it was here where he heard François Hollande speak and became a faithful supporter. Falorni joined the party in 1999 and became federal secretary of the party in 2004. In this role, Falorni organized the party's summer school from 2005 to 2011.

In the 2001 French municipal elections, Falorni was elected as a municipal councilor for La Rochelle on the list of Maxime Bono.

At the 2008 Reims Congress of the Socialist Party, Falorni supported the Clarity, courage, creativity motion supported by Francois Hollande, but voted against the Hope on the left, proud to be Socialist motion supported by Hollande's former partner and then Regional President Ségolène Royal. This event led to a split between the two, and allowed Martine Aubry to become federal secretary of the PS. In 2009, he helped found the club "Répondre à gauche", created by Stéphane Le Foll.

During the 2010 French regional elections, Falorni again found himself at odds with Ségolène Royal, who sought to name a rival candidate as the PS candidate in Falorni's seat of Charente-Maritime. Despite this, Falorni won the seat in the election, and was re-elected in 2017 and again in 2022.

Despite supporting PS dissident Jean-François Fountaine in the 2014 French municipal elections, Falorni became more critical of the new municipal administration. In September 2019, Falorni announced he would run against Fountaine in the 2020 French municipal elections. While Falorni received the most votes in the first round, he lost by 181 votes in the second round against the incumbent mayor. Elected as a member of the opposition, Falorni decided to resign his position.

== See also ==
- 2017 French legislative election
