= Canton of Lagord =

Coordinates: 46.19°N 1.16°W

The canton of Lagord is an administrative division of the Charente-Maritime department, western France. It was created at the French canton reorganisation which came into effect in March 2015. Its seat is in Lagord.

It consists of the following communes:

1. Esnandes
2. L'Houmeau
3. Lagord
4. Marsilly
5. Nieul-sur-Mer
6. Saint-Xandre
