= André Salardaine =

French politician

Mayor of La Rochelle
- In office 8 March 1959 – 14 March 1971
- Preceded by: Édouard Morch
- Succeeded by: Michel Crépeau
- Constituency: Charente-Maritime

Member of the Parliament
- In office 25 November 1962 – 30 May 1968
- Preceded by: Alain de Lacoste-Lareymondie
- Succeeded by: Philippe Dechartre
- Constituency: Charente-Maritime's (1st)

Personal details
- Born: 8 June 1908 Charron
- Died: 2 June 1985 (aged 76) Puilboreau
- Party: Union for the New Republic (UNR)
- Profession: Retired officer

André Salardaine (8 June 1908 in Charron – 2 June 1985 in Puilboreau) was a French Gaullist politician and a member of the Union for the New Republic (UNR).

He was a mayor of La Rochelle during twelve years (8 March 1959 – 14 March 1971) and an MP of the Charente-Maritime's 1st constituency during six years (25 November 1962 – 30 May 1968).

== Political mandates ==
=== Local mandate ===
- Mayor of La Rochelle : 8 March 1959 – 14 March 1971

=== National mandate ===
- MP of the Charente-Maritime's 1st constituency : 25 November 1962 – 30 May 1968
