= Jean-Louis Léonard =

French politician (born 1950)

Member of the Parliament
- In office 19 June 2002 – 19 June 2012
- Preceded by: Bernard Grasset
- Succeeded by: Suzanne Tallard
- Constituency: Charente-Maritime (2nd)
- In office 28 March 1993 – 21 April 1997
- Preceded by: Michel Crépeau
- Succeeded by: Michel Crépeau
- Constituency: Charente-Maritime (1st)

Mayor of Châtelaillon-Plage
- Incumbent
- Assumed office 21 November 1996
- Preceded by: Alain Lemaire
- In office 17 December 1984 – 18 June 1995
- Preceded by: Paul Michaud
- Succeeded by: Alain Lemaire

16th vice-president of the Agglomeration community of La Rochelle
- Incumbent
- Assumed office March 2008
- Constituency: Charente-Maritime

Vice-president of the Charente-Maritime's general council
- In office 28 March 1994 – 24 August 2002

General councillor
- In office 3 October 1988 – 24 August 2002
- Preceded by: Léon Belly
- Succeeded by: Stéphane Villain
- Constituency: Aytré

Municipal councillor of La Rochelle
- In office 18 June 1995 – 15 October 1996

Personal details
- Born: 24 July 1950 (age 75) Besançon (25)
- Party: UMP
- Profession: Engineer
- Website: https://web.archive.org/web/20110703193406/http://www.jeanlouisleonard.com/

Jean-Louis Léonard (French pronunciation: [ʒɑ̃ lwi leɔnaʁ]; born 24 July 1950 in Besançon (Doubs) is a French politician and a member of the Union for a Popular Movement (UMP).

A mayor of Châtelaillon-Plage from 1984 to 1995 and again since 1996, he has been a 16th vice-president of the Agglomeration community of La Rochelle since March 2008.

A former municipal councillor of La Rochelle (1995-1996), he represented two constituencies in the National Assembly of France : Charente-Maritime's 1st constituency (1993−1997) and Charente-Maritime's 2nd constituency (2002−2012).

== Political career (1983−present) ==
=== Local elections ===
==== Successful implantation: Châtelaillon-Plage and canton of Aytré ====
Engineer by profession, Jean-Louis Léonard began his political career on the occasion of the 1983 municipal elections. A member of the Rally for the Republic (RPR), he became a deputy mayor of Châtelaillon-Plage. In 1984, he succeeded the then mayor Paul Michaud after his death. In the 1989 municipal elections, he was re-elected as a mayor of Châtelaillon-Plage. After his resignation as a municipal councillor of La Rochelle, he was again elected as a mayor of Châtelaillon-Plage on 21 November 1996. He was re-elected as a mayor in the 2001 and 2008 municipal elections.

He has been a 16th vice-president of the Agglomeration community of La Rochelle since March 2008. In relations with the Charente-Maritime's general council, he is in charge of the direction schedule and tourist development thread.

In the 1988 cantonal elections, he was elected as a general councillor of Aytré succeeding Léon Belly (PCF). Re-elected as a general councillor of Aytré in 1994 and 2001, he has been a vice-president of the Charente-Maritime's general council between 1994 and 2002; during eight years, he was in charge of economics. On 24 August 2002, he resigned as a general councillor because of the law of accumulation of mandates ("Cumul des mandats").

==== Unsuccessful implantation: La Rochelle ====
Encouraged by his success in the 1993 legislative election, he left the municipality of Châtelaillon-Plage and faced Michel Crépeau, then mayor of La Rochelle, in the 1995 municipal election. Polling 29%, his municipal list was overwhelmingly defeated by the miscellaneous left list of Michel Crépeau (58.02%). A municipal councillor of La Rochelle since 18 June 1995, he resigned on 15 October 1996.

=== National elections ===
==== MP of La Rochelle (1993-1997) ====
In the 1993 legislative election, Jean-Louis Léonard defeated Michel Crépeau, mayor of La Rochelle since 1971 and MP of the Charente-Maritime's 1st constituency since 1973. A Member of the Parliament during four years, he did not run in this constituency in the 1997 legislative election.

==== MP of Rochefort (2002-2012) ====
In 2002, the Union for a Popular Movement (UMP) gained the Charente-Maritime's 2nd constituency, which had been won in 1997 by the socialist Bernard Grasset.

In the 2002 legislative election, he was a candidate in the Charente-Maritime's 2nd constituency (Rochefort and a part of Aunis). In the first round, he polled 38.45% (19,970 votes) whereas his socialist opponent André Bonnin got 29.88% (15,519 votes). In the run-off, he defeated André Bonnin (46.45%, 23,132 votes) and was largely elected with 53.55% (26,671 votes) as an MP of this constituency. In Châtelaillon-Plage, he largely got the absolute majority in the first-round (56.83%) and polled 65.50% in the run-off.

In the 2007 legislative election, he narrowly kept his seat in the run-off.

In the first round, he polled 42.98% (23,432 votes) whereas his socialist opponent André Bonnin got 29.99% (16,351 votes). In the run-off, he polled 50.20% (27,321 votes) whereas André Bonnin got 49.80% (27,101 votes). The gap consisted of only 220 votes between the two candidates. In Châtelaillon-Plage, he largely got the absolute majority in the first round (60.15%) and polled 65.48% in the run-off.

In the 2012 legislative election, he was defeated by the socialist candidate Suzanne Tallard, mayor of Aytré since 2008.

In the first round, he came first with 34.22% (19,238 votes) whereas his socialist opponent polled 31.50% (17,711 votes). In the run-off, he achieved 47.01% (26,391 votes) and was defeated by Suzanne Tallard (52.99%, 29,752 votes). In Châtelaillon-Plage, he largely got the absolute majority in the first round (57.00%) and achieved 63.08% in the run-off whereas in Aytré Suzanne Tallard polled 40.43% in the first round and largely got the absolute majority in the run-off (61.36%).

== Political mandates ==
=== Local mandates ===
- Mayor of Châtelaillon-Plage: 17 December 1984 – 18 June 1995; since 21 November 1996
- 16th vice-president of the Agglomeration community of La Rochelle: since March 2008

==== Former local mandates ====
- Municipal councillor of La Rochelle: 18 June 1995 – 15 October 1996
- General councillor of Aytré: 3 October 1988 – 24 August 2002
- Vice-president of the Charente-Maritime's general council (28 March 1994 – 24 August 2002): in charge of economics

=== National mandate ===
- MP of the Charente-Maritime's 2nd constituency (19 June 2002−19 June 2012) : Union for a Popular Movement parliamentary group, member of the committee of defence (2002−2007), member of the committee of economics (2007−2012), president of the friendship group France/Poland (2002−2012)

==== Former national mandate ====
- MP of the Charente-Maritime's 1st constituency: 28 March 1993 – 21 April 1997
