= Frédérique Tuffnell =

French politician

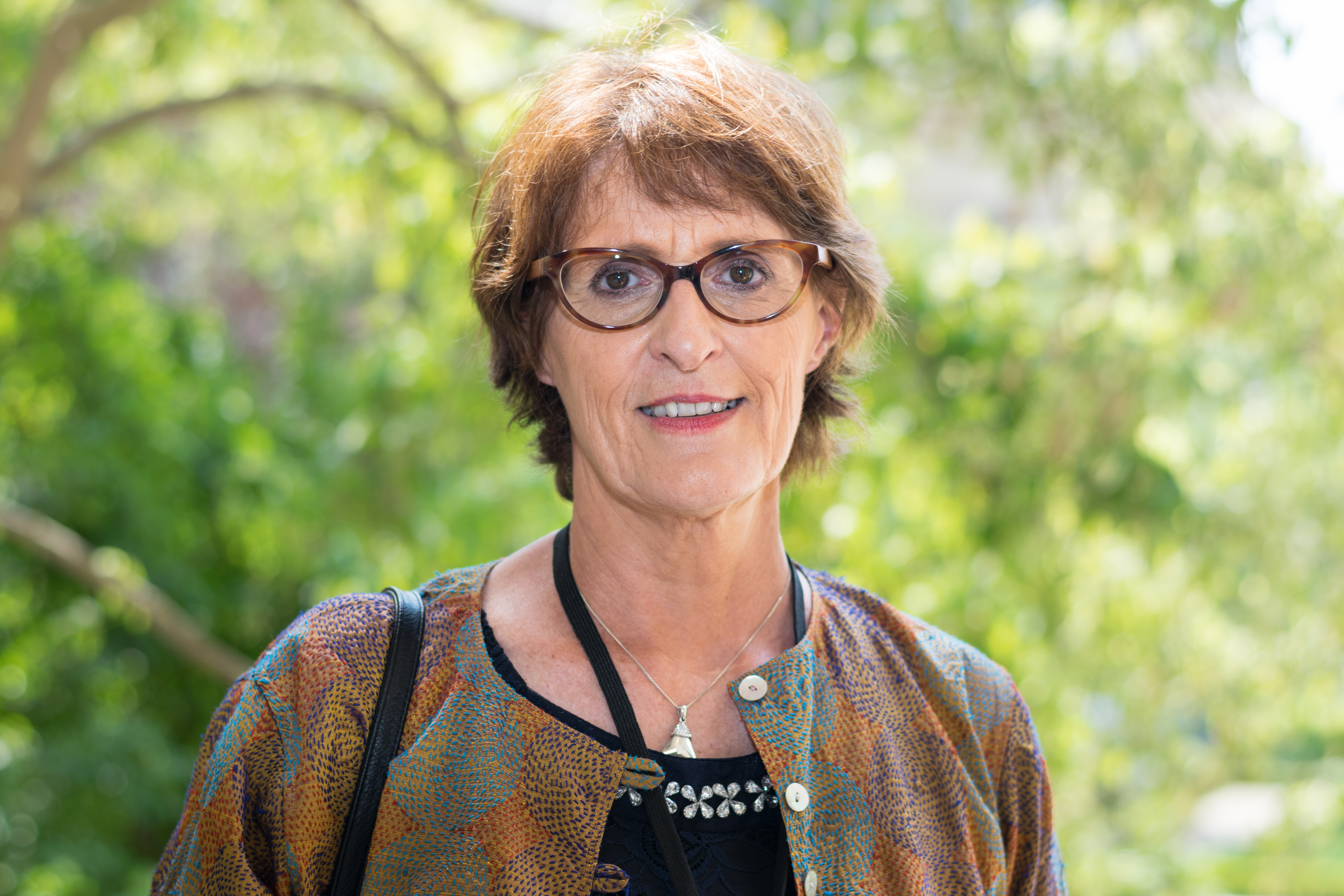

Member of the French National Assembly for Charente-Maritime's 2nd constituency
- In office 21 June 2017 – 21 June 2022
- Preceded by: Suzanne Tallard
- Succeeded by: Anne-Laure Babault

Personal details
- Born: 29 June 1956 (age 69) Châtellerault, France
- Party: La République En Marche! (2017–2020); Ecology Democracy Solidarity (2020)

Frédérique Tuffnell (born 29 June 1956) is a French politician who served as a member of the French National Assembly from 2017 to 2022, representing the department of Charente-Maritime. From 2017 until 2020, she was a member of La République En Marche! (LREM). In May 2020, she was one of the 17 initial members of the short-lived Ecology Democracy Solidarity group in the National Assembly.

== Political career ==
In parliament, Tuffnell served on the Committee on Sustainable Development and Spatial Planning. In addition to her committee assignments, she was a member of the French-Indian Parliamentary Friendship Group and the French-Sri Lankan Parliamentary Friendship Group.

In February 2020, Tuffnell left LREM, expressing frustration over the way the government was forcing through its radical reform of the pension system and failing to address environmental issues. In May 2020, she was one of the 17 initial members of the new Ecology Democracy Solidarity group in the National Assembly.

By mid-2021, Tuffnell announced that she would not stand in the 2022 elections but instead resign from active politics by the end of the parliamentary term.

== Political positions ==
In April 2018, Tuffnell joined other co-signatories around Sébastien Nadot in officially filing a request for a commission of inquiry into the legality of French weapons sales to the Saudi-led coalition fighting in Yemen, days before an official visit of Saudi Crown Prince Mohammed bin Salman to Paris.

== See also ==
- 2017 French legislative election
