= Charente-Maritime's 1st constituency =

Constituency of the National Assembly of France

1st constituency of Charente-Maritime
- inline Constituency of the National Assembly of France

- Constituency in department

- Charente-Maritime in France
- Incumbent deputy: Olivier Falorni; PRG
- Department: Charente-Maritime
- Cantons: Ars-en-Ré, La Rochelle-1, La Rochelle-2, La Rochelle-3, La Rochelle-4, La Rochelle-5, La Rochelle-6, La Rochelle-7, La Rochelle-8, La Rochelle-9, Saint-Martin-de-Ré
- Registered voters: 103,197 (2017)

The 1st constituency of Charente-Maritime (French: Première circonscription de la Charente-Maritime) is one of five electoral districts in the department of the same name, each of which returns one deputy to the French National Assembly in elections using the two-round system, with a run-off if no candidate receives more than 50% of the vote in the first round.

Since 2012, the constituency has been represented by Olivier Falorni, first as a Miscellaneous Left deputy and then as a deputy for the Radical Party of the Left. The constituency covers the city of La Rochelle and the Île de Ré.

== Description ==
The constituency is made up of 11 pre-2015 cantons: those of Ars-en-Ré, La Rochelle-1, La Rochelle-2, La Rochelle-3, La Rochelle-4, La Rochelle-5, La Rochelle-6, La Rochelle-7, La Rochelle-8, La Rochelle-9, and Saint-Martin-de-Ré.

At the time of the 1999 census (which was the basis for the most recent redrawing of constituency boundaries, carried out in 2010) the 1st constituency had a total population of 130,679.

== Deputies ==
Election	Member	Party
1958	Alain de Lacoste-Lareymondie	CNIP
1962	André Salardaine	UNR
1967	André Salardaine	UDR
1968	Philippe Dechartre	UDR
1973	Michel Crépeau	PRG
1978	Michel Crépeau	PRG
1981	Michel Crépeau	PRG
1986	Proportional representation – no election by constituency	
1988	Michel Crépeau	MRG
1993	Jean-Louis Léonard	RPR
1997	Michel Crépeau	PRG
2002	Maxime Bono	PS
2007	Maxime Bono	PS
2012	Olivier Falorni	PRG
2017	Olivier Falorni	PRG
2022	Olivier Falorni	PRG
2024	Olivier Falorni	PRG

== Election results ==
=== 2024 ===
Candidate	Party	Alliance	First round			Second round		
Candidate	Party	Alliance	Votes	%	+/–	Votes	%	+/–
Olivier Falorni	PRG	ENS	34,824	45.64	+22.65	54,353	74.71	
Jean-Marc Soubeste	LÉ	NFP	22,618	29.64	+6.25	WITHDREW		
Emma Chauveau	RN		17,278	22.65	+13.11	18,396	25.29	
Nicolas Francois	REC		975	1.28	-2.56			
Antoine Colin	LO		430	0.56	-0.02			
Philippe Pere	DIV		170	0.22	+0.16			
Yasmina Samri	DIV		2	0.00	N/A			
Françoise Ramel	DIV		0	0.00	N/A			
Valid votes			76,297	98.15	-0.88			
Blank votes			1,055	1.36	+0.69			
Null votes			383	0.49	+0.19			
Turnout			77,735	69.48	+19.16			
Abstentions			34,147	30.52	-19.16			
Registered voters			111,882					
Source: Ministry of the Interior, Le Monde
Result						PRG hold		

=== 2022 ===
Legislative Election 2022: Charente-Maritime's 1st constituency
Party	Candidate	Votes	%	±%
PRG	Olivier Falorni	15,976	29.02	N/A
EELV (NUPÉS)	Jean-Marc Soubeste	12,875	23.39	+7.20
LREM (Ensemble)	Martine Madelaine	12,656	22.99	−4.00
RN	Emma Chauveau	5,253	9.54	+2.51
DVG	Marie Nedellec	4,061	7.38	N/A
REC	Nicolas Francois	2,114	3.84	N/A
Others	N/A	2,117	3.85	
Turnout		55,052	50.32	−0.84
2nd round result
PRG	Olivier Falorni	34,576	66.11	N/A
EELV (NUPÉS)	Jean-Marc Soubeste	17,721	33.89	N/A
Turnout		52,297	49.38	+5.96
PRG gain from DVG				

=== 2017 ===
Candidate	Label	First round		Second round	
Candidate	Label	Votes	%	Votes	%
Olivier Falorni	PRG	19,086	36.54	28,765	69.02
Otilia Ferreira	MoDem	14,095	26.99	12,913	30.98
Cédric Ruffié	FI	5,703	10.92		
Bruno Leal	LR	5,134	9.83		
Jean-Marc de Lacoste-Lareymondie	FN	3,671	7.03		
Jean-Marc Soubeste	ECO	2,040	3.91		
Brahim Jlalji	PCF	712	1.36		
Hanitra Ratrimo	DIV	540	1.03		
Patrick Viot	ECO	523	1.00		
Antoine Colin	EXG	290	0.56		
Jean-Pierre Ernst	DIV	221	0.42		
Waël Gribaa	DIV	215	0.41		
Votes		52,230	100.00	41,678	100.00
Valid votes		52,230	98.93	41,678	93.00
Blank votes		390	0.74	2,173	4.85
Null votes		173	0.33	962	2.15
Turnout		52,793	51.16	44,813	43.42
Abstentions		50,404	48.84	58,384	56.58
Registered voters		103,197		103,197	
Source: Ministry of the Interior

=== 2012 ===
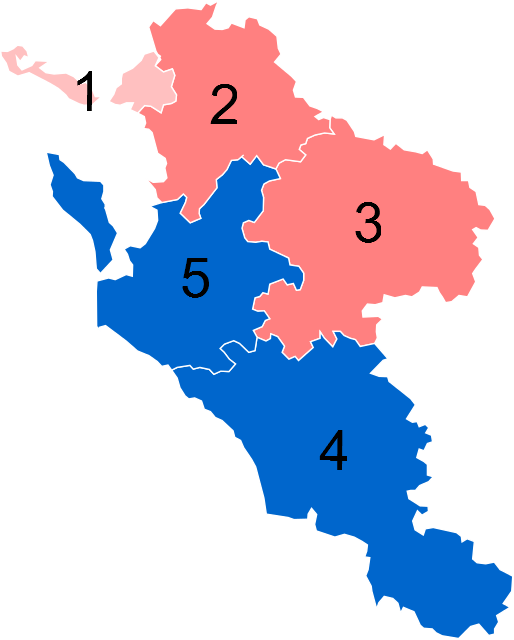
Results in the Charente-Maritime's five constituencies in 2012 : pale pink (PRG), pink (PS), blue (UMP)

Summary of the 10 June and 17 June 2012 French legislative election in Charante Maritime’s 1st Constituency
Candidate	Party		1st round		2nd round	
Candidate	Party		Votes	%	Votes	%
Olivier Falorni	Radical Party of the Left	PRG	17,155	28.91%	38,545	62.98%
Ségolène Royal	Socialist Party	PS	19,005	32.03%	22,661	37.02%
Sally Chadjaa	Union for a Popular Movement	UMP	11,554	19.47%		
Marie-Françoise de Lacoste Lareymondie	Front National	FN	4,036	6.80%		
Brigitte Desveaux	Europe Ecology – The Greens	EELV	2,186	3.68%		
Esther Memain	Left Front	FG	2,019	3.40%		
François Drageon	Radical Party	PRV	1,117	1.88%		
Arnaud Jaulin	Centrist	CEN	1,061	1.79%		
Michèle Coindeau	Ecologist	ECO	531	0.89%		
France Prenat	Miscellaneous Right	DVD	256	0.43%		
Antoine Colin	Far Left	EXG	197	0.33%		
Michel le Creff	Miscellaneous Left	DVG	137	0.23%		
Rodolphe Huguet	Other	AUT	62	0.10%		
Alain Ignacimouttou	Miscellaneous Left	DVG	18	0.03%		
Total			59,334	100%	61,206	100%
Registered voters			98,753		98,754	
Blank/Void ballots			570	0.58%	2,041	2.07%
Turnout			59,904	60.66%	63,247	64.05%
Abstentions			38,849	39.34%	35,507	35.95%
Result					DVG GAIN FROM PS	

=== 2007 ===
Summary of the 10 June and 17 June 2007 French legislative election in Charante Maritime’s 1st Constituency
Candidate	Party		1st round		2nd round	
Candidate	Party		Votes	%	Votes	%
Maxime Bono	Socialist Party	PS	23,928	40.77%	32,345	55.05%
Dominique Morvant	Union for a Popular Movement	UMP	21,099	35.95%	26,409	44.95%
Elisabeth Delorme-Blaizot	Democratic Movement	MoDem	3,479	5.93%		
Richard Douard	Majorité Presidentielle	Maj Pres	1,719	2.93%		
Gaëlle Mangin	The Greens	VEC	1,658	2.83%		
Jean-Marc de Lacoste Lareymondie	Front National	FN	1,422	2.42%		
Esther Memain	Communist	PCF	1,349	2.30%		
Patrick Vallee	Far Left	EXG	1,043	1.78%		
Serge Lavaud	Movement for France	MPF	772	1.32%		
Jean-Noël Debroise	Ecologist	ECO	743	1.27%		
Michelle Richard	Hunting, Fishing, Nature, Traditions	CPNT	617	1.05%		
Claire Melchiori	Independent	DIV	375	0.64%		
Antoine Colin	Far Left	EXG	308	0.52%		
Jacques Dumerc	Far Left	EXG	174	0.30%		
Total			58,686	100%	58,754	100%
Registered voters			95,906		96,463	
Blank/Void ballots			555	0.94%	3,109	5.03%
Turnout			59,241	61.77%	61,863	64.13%
Abstentions			36,665	38.23%	34,600	35.87%
Result					PS HOLD	

=== 2002 ===
Legislative Election 2002: Charente-Maritime's 1st constituency
Party	Candidate	Votes	%	±%
PS	Maxime Bono	21,138	37.12	
UMP	Catherine Normandin	15,731	27.63	
UDF	Philippe Chastenet	5,131	9.01	
FN	Yolande Bak	3,612	6.34	
PRG	Gilles Gautronneau	3,070	5.39	
PCF	Esther Queneudec-Memain	1,482	2.60	
LV	Alain Bucherie	1,403	2.46	
DL	Christian Dessens	1,289	2.26	
Others	N/A	4,083		
Turnout		57,675	65.88	
2nd round result
PS	Maxime Bono	28,725	53.02	
UMP	Catherine Normandin	25,457	46.98	
Turnout		55,514	63.41	
PS gain from PRG				

=== 1997 ===
Legislative Election 1997: Charente-Maritime's 1st constituency
Party	Candidate	Votes	%	±%
PRG	Michel Crépeau	21,870	42.81	
UDF	Françoise Clerc	13,602	26.62	
FN	Jean-François Galvaire	5,225	10.23	
PCF	Esther Queneudec-Memain	4,233	8.29	
LV	Alain Mouzeau	2,155	4.22	
MPF	Eric Revel	1,898	3.72	
Others	N/A	2,105		
Turnout		53,005	66.30	
2nd round result
PRG	Michel Crépeau	31,495	59.57	
UDF	Françoise Clerc	21,377	40.43	
Turnout		55,127	68.95	
PRG gain from RPR				

== Sources ==
- "Résultats électoraux officiels en France" (in French). 2017.
- Notes and portraits of the French MPs under the Fifth Republic, French National Assembly
- 2012 French legislative elections : Charente-Maritime's 1st constituency (first round and run-off), Minister of the Interior
- Constituencies of the Charente-Maritime, Atlaspol website
