= Anne-Laure Babault =

French politician (born 1982)

Member of the National Assembly for Charente-Maritime's 2nd constituency
- In office 21 June 2022 – 9 June 2024
- Preceded by: Frédérique Tuffnell
- Succeeded by: Benoît Biteau

Personal details
- Born: 3 January 1982 (age 44) Gien, Loiret, France
- Party: MoDem
- Other political affiliations: Ensemble

Anne-Laure Babault (born 3 January 1982) is a French politician from MoDem (Ensemble). She has been member of the National Assembly for Charente-Maritime's 2nd constituency from 2022 to 2024.

== Biography ==
Anne-Laure Babault moved to Charente-Maritime in the early 2000s, where she worked for Crédit Mutuel for eight years.

She resumed her studies at the age of 26 and obtained a master's degree in business administration. She then entered the world of marketing. She worked for Léa Nature as a sales executive for nearly eleven years.

She has a daughter, whom she is raising alone.

She was elected municipal councilor of Salles-sur-Mer in 2020 on Chantal Subra's list (various right-wing parties), then appointed delegate for tourism, camping, and public relations.

== See also ==
- List of deputies of the 16th National Assembly of France
