= Suzanne Tallard =

French politician

Member of the French National Assembly for Charente-Maritime's 2nd constituency
- In office 20 June 2012 – 20 June 2017
- Preceded by: Jean-Louis Léonard
- Succeeded by: Frédérique Tuffnell

Personal details
- Born: 29 June 1956 (age 69) La Rochelle, France
- Party: Socialist

Suzanne Tallard (French pronunciation: [syzan talaʁ]; born 19 June 1943) is a French politician who was Member of Parliament for Charente-Maritime's 2nd constituency between 2012 and 2017.

She was Mayor of Aytré from 2008 to 2012.
