= Nieul-sur-Mer =

- Commune
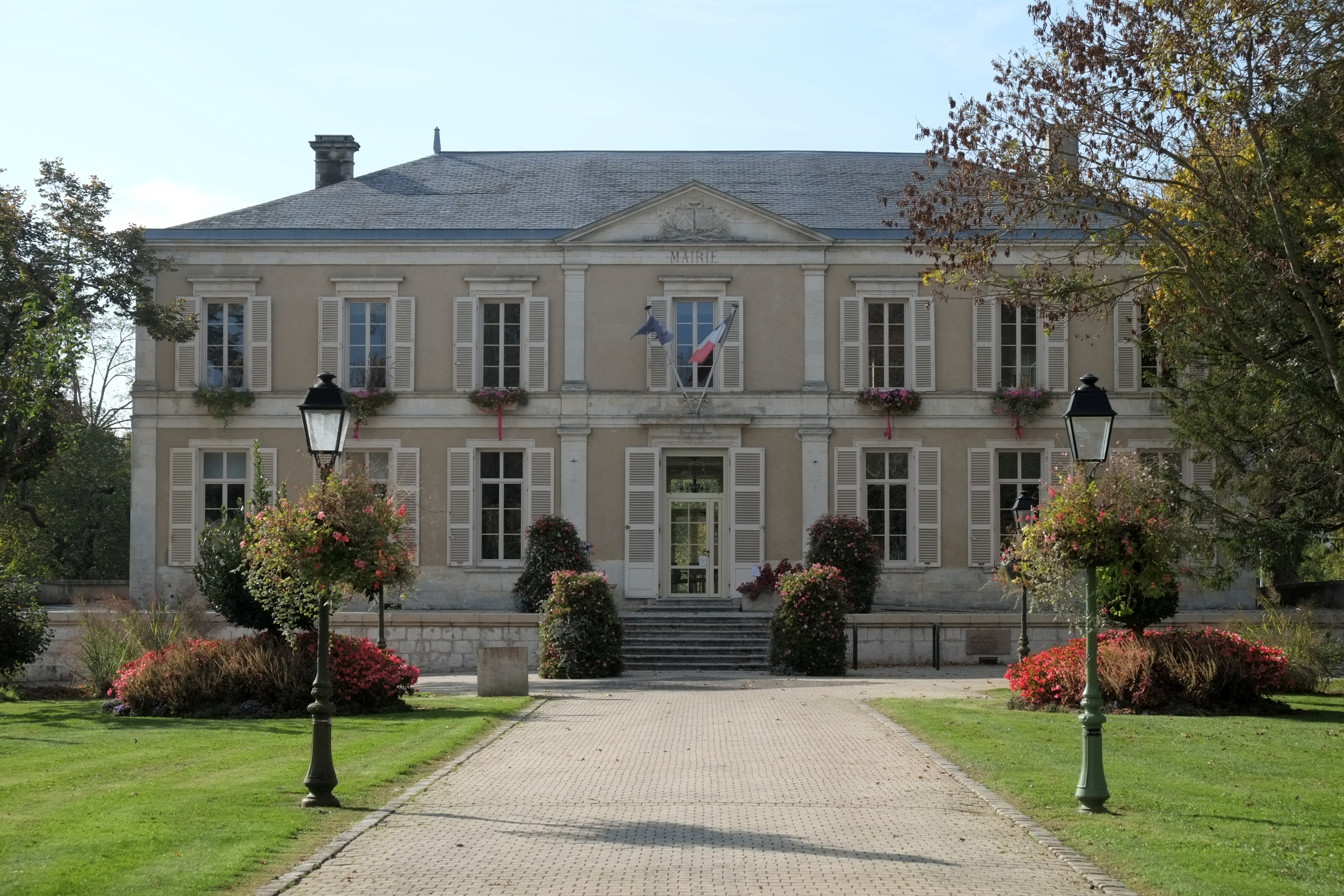
- The town hall in Nieul-sur-Mer
- Location of Nieul-sur-Mer
- Location within France Location within Nouvelle-Aquitaine
- Coordinates: 46°12′27″N 1°09′45″W
- Country: France
- Region: Nouvelle-Aquitaine
- Department: Charente-Maritime
- Arrondissement: La Rochelle
- Canton: Lagord
- Intercommunality: CA La Rochelle

Government
  - Mayor (2020–2026): Marc Maigné
- Area^{1}: 10.96 km^{2} (4.23 sq mi)
- Elevation: 5 m (16 ft)
- Highest elevation: 34 m (112 ft)
- Lowest elevation: 0 m (0 ft)
- Population (2023): 5,811
  - Density: 530.2/km^{2} (1,373/sq mi)
- Time zone: UTC+01:00 (CET)
  - Summer (DST): UTC+02:00 (CEST)
- INSEE/Postal code: 17264 /17137
- ^{1} French Land Register data, which excludes lakes, ponds, glaciers > 1 km^{2} (0.386 sq mi or 247 acres) and river estuaries.

Nieul-sur-Mer (French pronunciation: [njœl syʁ mɛʁ]) is a commune in the Charente-Maritime department in southwestern France.

== Population ==
Historical population
Year	Pop.	±% p.a.
1968	1,763	—
1975	2,581	+5.60%
1982	4,057	+6.67%
1990	4,957	+2.54%
1999	5,641	+1.45%
2007	5,600	−0.09%
2012	5,712	+0.40%
2017	5,759	+0.16%
2023	5,811	+0.15%
Source: INSEE

== See also ==
- Communes of the Charente-Maritime department
