= Lagord =

- Commune
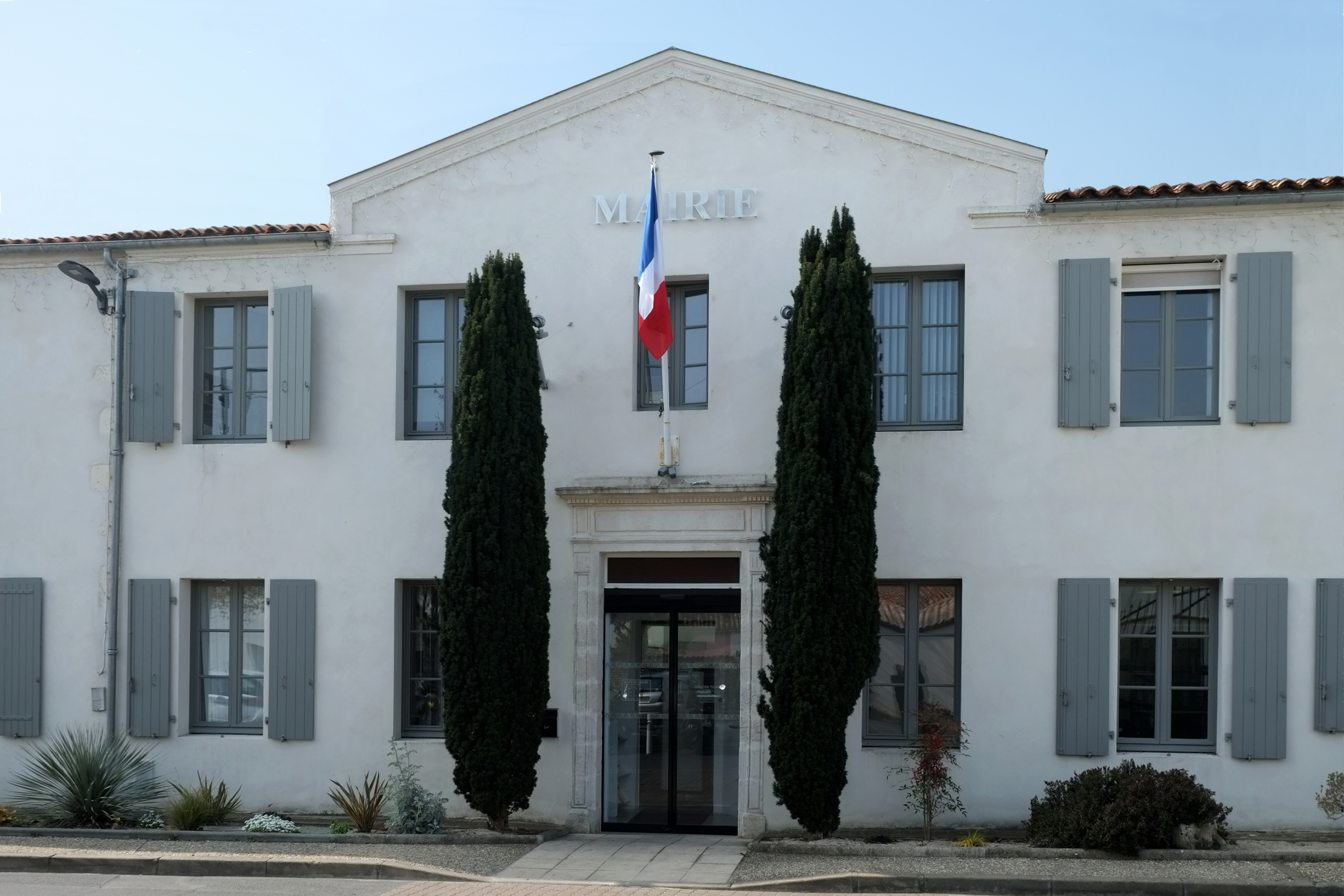
- The town hall in Lagord

- Coat of arms
- Location of Lagord
- Location within France Location within Nouvelle-Aquitaine
- Coordinates: 46°11′25″N 1°09′10″W
- Country: France
- Region: Nouvelle-Aquitaine
- Department: Charente-Maritime
- Arrondissement: La Rochelle
- Canton: Lagord
- Intercommunality: CA La Rochelle

Government
  - Mayor (2020–2026): Antoine Grau
- Area^{1}: 8.04 km^{2} (3.10 sq mi)
- Highest elevation: 30 m (98 ft)
- Lowest elevation: 4 m (13 ft)
- Population (2023): 7,802
  - Density: 970/km^{2} (2,510/sq mi)
- Time zone: UTC+01:00 (CET)
  - Summer (DST): UTC+02:00 (CEST)
- INSEE/Postal code: 17200 /17140
- ^{1} French Land Register data, which excludes lakes, ponds, glaciers > 1 km^{2} (0.386 sq mi or 247 acres) and river estuaries.

Lagord (French pronunciation: [laɡɔʁ]) is a commune in the Charente-Maritime department in southwestern France.

== Population ==
Historical population
Year	Pop.	±% p.a.
1968	4,125	—
1975	4,061	−0.22%
1982	5,056	+3.18%
1990	5,287	+0.56%
1999	6,456	+2.24%
2007	7,054	+1.11%
2012	7,236	+0.51%
2017	7,048	−0.53%
2023	7,802	+1.71%
Source: INSEE

== See also ==
- Communes of the Charente-Maritime department
