= Esnandes =

- Commune
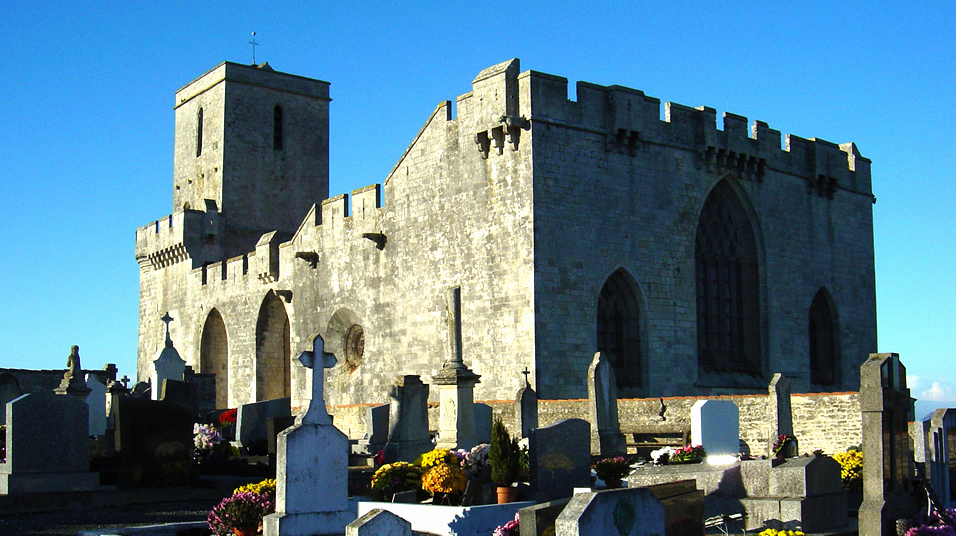
- The church in Esnandes

- Coat of arms
- Location of Esnandes
- Location within France Location within Nouvelle-Aquitaine
- Coordinates: 46°15′01″N 1°06′49″W
- Country: France
- Region: Nouvelle-Aquitaine
- Department: Charente-Maritime
- Arrondissement: La Rochelle
- Canton: Lagord
- Intercommunality: CA La Rochelle

Government
  - Mayor (2023–2026): Rémi Desplantes
- Area^{1}: 7.45 km^{2} (2.88 sq mi)
- Highest elevation: 19 m (62 ft)
- Lowest elevation: 0 m (0 ft)
- Population (2023): 2,224
  - Density: 299/km^{2} (773/sq mi)
- Time zone: UTC+01:00 (CET)
  - Summer (DST): UTC+02:00 (CEST)
- INSEE/Postal code: 17153 /17137
- ^{1} French Land Register data, which excludes lakes, ponds, glaciers > 1 km^{2} (0.386 sq mi or 247 acres) and river estuaries.

Esnandes (French pronunciation: [ɛnɑ̃d]) is a commune in the Charente-Maritime department in the Nouvelle-Aquitaine region in southwestern France. Its inhabitants are known as Esnandais (pronounced [ɛsnɑ̃dɛ]).

== Geography ==
This small town north of La Rochelle faces the bay of Aiguillon (formerly Gulf Pictons). It situates on the cliffs overlooking the bays where mussels and oysters are produced which are still culminating to this day.

== History ==
The first written mention of Esnandes dates to 920. In 1987, archaeological excavations traced the history of Esnandes thousands of years ago. Prehistoric sites, including a salt mine is behind an Esnandes church. The Roman occupation left traces in the form of a Roman villa at the Saint-Clement.

Esnandes is famous for its revamped church. In 1622, the Council of the City of La Rochelle ordered its destruction in place for a Catholic stronghold. Its main activity include mussel farming which date back to the 13th century.

The names of the trustees of the parish have come down to us:

- 1737: François Dugas, mussel farmer
- 1754: Mathurin Michelon, innkeeper
- 1754–1759: François Maudet
- 1759–1765: Jacques Blanchard, merchant, elected on 19 August 1759
- 1766: Jean-Baptiste Mesnard, merchant, elected on 24 January 1766
- 1781: Jacques Choyau
- 1782–1787: Jean Maudet, died on 13 July 1787, at age 56
- 1787–1789: Charles Valton, mussel farmer

== Population ==
Historical population
| Year | Pop. | ±% p.a. |
|---|---|---|
| 1968 | 719 | — |
| 1975 | 781 | +1.19% |
| 1982 | 1,370 | +8.36% |
| 1990 | 1,730 | +2.96% |
| 1999 | 1,836 | +0.66% |
| 2007 | 1,994 | +1.04% |
| 2012 | 2,094 | +0.98% |
| 2017 | 2,069 | −0.24% |
| 2023 | 2,224 | +1.21% |
Source: INSEE

== Administration ==
Esnandes is one of the 28 communes of the Communauté d'agglomération de La Rochelle (Community of agglomeration of La Rochelle). It is the intercommunality with the highest population in Charente-Maritime.

Esnandes is twinned with Thorens-Glières.

== Economy ==
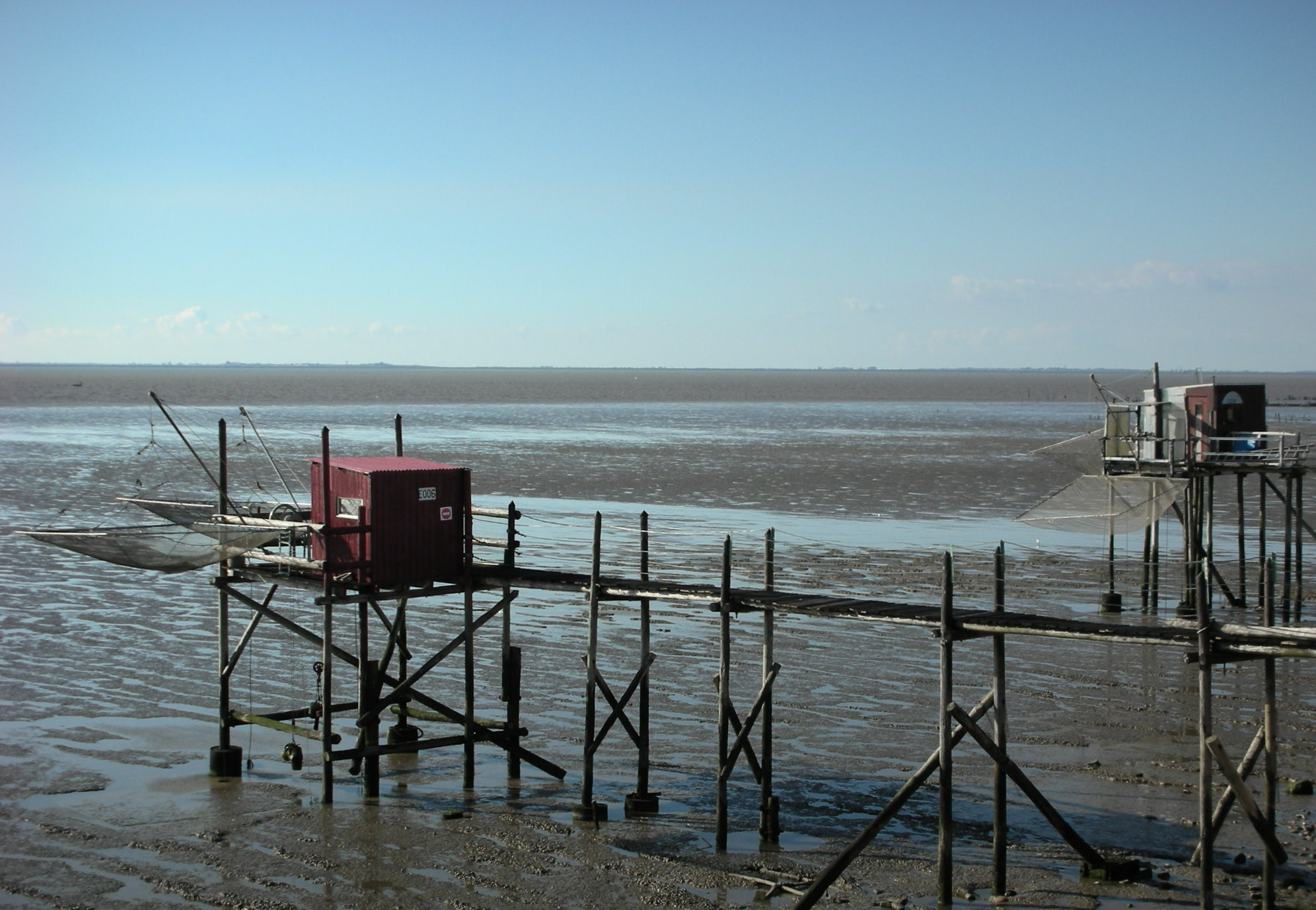
Carrelets à Esnandes

There are

- 23 aquaculture companies producing mussels with the brand name "Charron"
- 5 companies in the industry: 12 in construction, 6 shops, 8 services. 8 farms
- a baker, a grocery store, a butcher / deli and a coffee shop / newspaper agent.
- two doctors, a pharmacist, a dentist, a nurse and a physiotherapist.
- 1 post office

== Religious heritage ==
The Priory of St. Martin or Church of St. Martin belonged to the Royal Abbey of Saint-Jean-d'Angély since 1029. The original building dates back to the eleventh and twelfth century but was rebuilt and restored in the fourteenth century. Since then, it has been modified several times. In 1840, the church was recognised as a historic monument.

To this date, it still retains its Romanesque style from the twelfth century, which is decorated and framed by two booths which form a complete set of reinforcements. The bell tower is square-shaped and pierced with narrow windows. A spiral staircase gives access to walkways equipped with aliasing, machicolations and bartizans. The east wall is pierced by three windows, a postern and a ditch were added to the defense later. The nave is vaulted with warheads based on columns and form three ships and five spans with flat bed. The two Gothic sacristies are both located behind the side altars.

Religious wars have caused extensive damage. After the fall of La Rochelle (28 October 1628), repairs began in 1629 and continued until 1740. Repairs carried out throughout the building as well as the nave's vault and the choir. The church was restored again starting in 1864 then coverage was repeated in 1996.

== Cultural Heritage ==
'The House of Mussel Culture 'Mytiliculture'

Mussel farms collect approximately 10,000 tons of shellfish products (including mussels) per year from the Bay of Aiguillon, which has been producing shellfish since 1235. The mussel farms of Esnandes (Labellisée Musée de France) reflect the strong local heritage: understanding activity and environment, the House of Mussel Farms offers films, a dynamic and interactive museum and temporary exhibitions (or closely related themes on the region, environment, fisheries, cultural exhibits are conducted jointly with various associations of the township.)

Thus, young and old can follow Mollux, the mascot, throughout the visit (in the form of comics for children) to understand the biology of mold, its environment and its predators, and the production and marketing of the black pearl of our coasts. The coastal path called "customs" attract walkers.

== Personalities ==
- Guy lords and Amaury de Vivonne (crusades of 1129 and 1194) who became kings of Cyprus and Jerusalem.
- The family of Alcide d'Orbigny, French zoologist lived in a house in Esnandes.
- Georges Simenon's books which are often referred to Esnandes and its neighborhoods.

== See also ==
- Communes of the Charente-Maritime department
