= Charente-Maritime's 2nd constituency =

Constituency of the National Assembly of France

2nd constituency of Charente-Maritime
- inline Constituency of the National Assembly of France

- Constituency in department

- Charente-Maritime in France
- Incumbent deputy: Anne-Laure Babault; MoDem
- Department: Charente-Maritime
- Cantons: Aigrefeuille-d'Aunis, Aytré, Courçon, La Jarrie, Marans, Rochefort-Centre, Rochefort-Nord, Rochefort-Sud, Surgères
- Registered voters: 104,292 (2017)

The 2nd constituency of Charente-Maritime (French: Deuxième circonscription de la Charente-Maritime) is one of five electoral districts in the department of Charente-Maritime, each of which returns one deputy to the French National Assembly in elections using the two-round system, with a run-off if no candidate receives more than 50% of the vote in the first round.

== Description ==
The constituency is made up of nine cantons: those of Aigrefeuille-d'Aunis, Aytré, Courçon, La Jarrie, Marans, Rochefort-Centre, Rochefort-Nord, Rochefort-Sud, and Surgères.

At the time of the 1999 census (which was the basis for the most recent redrawing of constituency boundaries, carried out in 2010) the 2nd constituency had a total population of 112,535.

== Deputies ==
Election	Member	Party
1958	Albert Bignon	UNR
1962	Albert Bignon	UNR
1967	Albert Bignon	UDR
1968	Albert Bignon	UDR
1973	Albert Bignon	UDR
1978	Jean-Guy Branger	DVD
1981	Jean-Guy Branger	UDF
1986	Proportional representation – no election by constituency	
1988	Jean-Guy Branger	UDF
1993	Jean-Guy Branger	UDF
1997	Bernard Grasset	PS
2002	Jean-Louis Léonard	UMP
2007	Jean-Louis Léonard	UMP
2012	Suzanne Tallard	PS
2017	Frédérique Tuffnell	LREM
2020	Frédérique Tuffnell	EDS
2022	Anne-Laure Babault	MoDem

== Election results ==
=== 2024 ===
Candidate	Party	Alliance	First round			Second round		
Candidate	Party	Alliance	Votes	%	+/–	Votes	%	+/–
Karen Bertholom	RN		26,862	34.41	+14.05	33,155	46.61	
Benoît Biteau	LÉ	NFP	21,027	26.94	-0.56	37,985	53.39	
Anne-Laure Babault	MoDem	ENS	19,773	25.33	-2.76	WITHDREW		
Hervé Blanché	LR		9,651	12.36	+0.05			
Frédéric Castello	LO		749	0.96	+0.04			
Valid votes			78,062	97.56	-0.51			
Blank votes			1,379	1.72	+0.30			
Null votes			577	0.72	+0.21			
Turnout			80,018	70.42	+21.09			
Abstentions			33,612	29.58	-21.09			
Registered voters			113,630					
Source: Ministry of the Interior, Le Monde
Result						TBD GAIN FROM MoDem		

=== 2022 ===
Legislative Election 2022: Charente-Maritime's 2nd constituency
Party	Candidate	Votes	%	±%
MoDem (Ensemble)	Anne-Laure Babault	15,246	28.09	-10.39
LFI (NUPÉS)	Nordine Raymond	14,928	27.50	+3.74
RN	Richard Guerit	11,049	20.36	+8.02
LR (UDC)	David Labiche	6,680	12.31	−7.07
DIV	Evelyne Serrurier	2,162	2.98	N/A
REC	Corinne Giraud	1,837	3.38	N/A
Others	N/A	2,376	4.38	
Turnout		54,278	49.33	−0.47
2nd round result
MoDem (Ensemble)	Anne-Laure Babault	25,863	51.76	-5.51
LFI (NUPÉS)	Nordine Raymond	24,107	48.24	N/A
Turnout		49,970	48.61	+7.17
MoDem gain from LREM				

=== 2017 ===
Candidate	Label	First round		Second round	
Candidate	Label	Votes	%	Votes	%
Frédérique Tuffnell	REM	19,612	38.48	21,859	57.27
Sylvie Marcilly	LR	9,878	19.38	16,307	42.73
Maud Assila	FI	7,915	15.53		
Jean-Louis Leygonie	FN	6,292	12.34		
Brigitte Desveaux	ECO	3,369	6.61		
Michèle Grenier	PCF	828	1.62		
Dominique Droin	DLF	736	1.44		
Jean-Claude Wallard	DIV	655	1.29		
Catherine Deneuve	DIV	576	1.13		
Frédéric Castello	EXG	373	0.73		
Dominique Raby	DIV	365	0.72		
Guy Burguin	DIV	320	0.63		
Philippe Riché	DVG	52	0.10		
Votes		50,971	100.00	38,166	100.00
Valid votes		50,971	98.12	38,166	88.31
Blank votes		683	1.31	3,634	8.41
Null votes		292	0.56	1,419	3.28
Turnout		51,946	49.80	43,219	41.44
Abstentions		52,353	50.20	61,073	58.56
Registered voters		104,299		104,292	
Source: Ministry of the Interior

=== 2012 ===
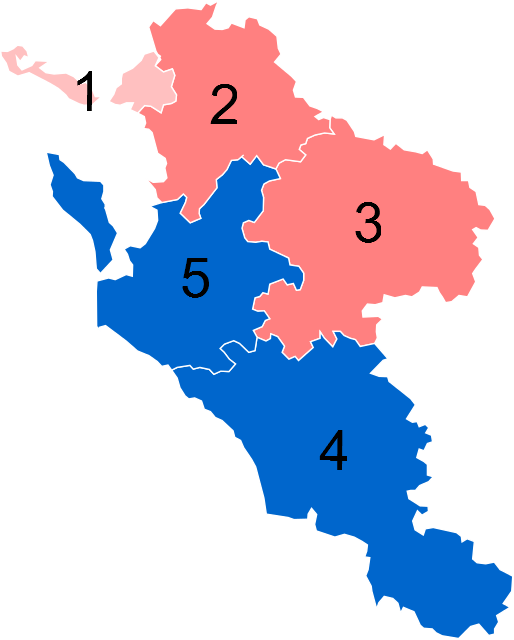
Results in the Charente-Maritime's five constituencies in 2012 : pale pink (Miscellaneous left), pink (PS), blue (UMP)

Summary of the 10 June and 17 June 2012 French legislative election in Charante Maritime’s 2nd Constituency
Candidate	Party		1st round		2nd round	
Candidate	Party		Votes	%	Votes	%
Suzanne Tallard	Socialist Party	PS	17,711	31.50%	29,752	52.99%
Jean-Louis Leonard	Union for a Popular Movement	UMP	19,238	34.22%	26,391	47.01%
David Baudon	Miscellaneous Left	DVG	7,086	12.60%		
Joan Desire	Front National	FN	5,261	9.36%		
Gérard Blanchier	Left Front	FG	2,685	4.78%		
Patrick Angibaud	Europe Ecology – The Greens	EELV	2,144	3.81%		
Dominique Droin	Miscellaneous Right	DVD	806	1.43%		
Victor Domingues	Miscellaneous Left	DVG	472	0.84%		
Jean-Luc Delcampo	Miscellaneous Left	DVG	381	0.68%		
Frédéric Castello	Far Left	EXG	240	0.43%		
Claude Billot Zeller	Far Right	EXD	195	0.35%		
Total			56,219	100%	56,143	100%
Registered voters			97,490		97,489	
Blank/Void ballots			879	0.90%	1,559	1.60%
Turnout			57,098	58.57%	57,702	59.19%
Abstentions			40,392	41.43%	39,787	40.81%
Result					PS GAIN FROM UMP	

=== 2007 ===
Summary of the 10 June and 17 June 2007 French legislative election in Charante Maritime’s 2nd Constituency
Candidate	Party		1st round		2nd round	
Candidate	Party		Votes	%	Votes	%
Jean-Louis Leonard	Union for a Popular Movement	UMP	23,432	42.98%	27,321	50.20%
André Bonnin	Socialist Party	PS	16,351	29.99%	27,101	49.80%
Jacques Maret	Democratic Movement	MoDem	2,756	5.05%		
Corinne Cap	The Greens	VEC	2,170	3.98%		
Gérard Blanchier	Communist	PCF	1,905	3.49%		
Thierry Joulin	Hunting, Fishing, Nature, Traditions	CPNT	1,828	3.35%		
Marie-Françoise Catalan	Front National	FN	1,713	3.14%		
Denis Poulain	Far Left	EXG	1,411	2.59%		
Dominique Droin	Movement for France	MPF	1,091	2.00%		
Michel Bel	Independent	DIV	602	1.10%		
Anne Bernon	Far Left	EXG	461	0.85%		
Laurent Talbot	Independent	DIV	380	0.70%		
Jean-Claude Deborde	Far Left	EXG	271	0.50%		
Fabrice Restier	Miscellaneous Right	DVD	153	0.28%		
Total			54,524	100%	54,422	100%
Registered voters			92,261		92,262	
Blank/Void ballots			992	1.79%	1,289	2.31%
Turnout			55,516	60.17%	55,711	60.38%
Abstentions			36,745	39.83%	36,551	39.62%
Result					UMP HOLD	

=== 2002 ===
Legislative Election 2002: Charente-Maritime's 2nd constituency
Party	Candidate	Votes	%	±%
UMP	Jean-Louis Leonard	19,970	38.45	
PS	André Bonnin	15,519	29.88	
FN	Michel Erbe	3,734	7.19	
CPNT	Thierry Joulin	2,994	5.76	
UDF	Fanny Lortat-Jacob	1,776	3.42	
PCF	Gérard Blanchier	1,630	3.14	
LV	Corinne Cap	1,395	2.69	
Others	N/A	4,917		
Turnout		53,089	63.77	
2nd round result
UMP	Jean-Louis Leonard	26,671	53.55	
PS	André Bonnin	23,132	46.45	
Turnout		51,355	61.69	
UMP gain from PS				

=== 1997 ===
Legislative Election 1997: Charente-Maritime's 2nd constituency
Party	Candidate	Votes	%	±%
UDF	Jean-Guy Branger	14,931	31.52	
PS	Bernard Grasset	12,877	27.18	
FN	Michel Gauchou	5,367	11.33	
PCF	Alain Belly	5,009	10.57	
DVD	Jean-Claude Chatelet	2,727	5.76	
LV	Alain Bucherie	2,477	5.23	
MPF	Bernard Biron	1,804	3.81	
MEI	Yvan Poisbeau	1,329	2.81	
MRC	Jean-Luc Delcampo	848	1.79	
Turnout		49,980	65.94	
2nd round result
PS	Bernard Grasset	26,791	53.07	
UDF	Jean-Guy Branger	23,691	46.93	
Turnout		53,423	70.49	
PS gain from UDF				

== Sources ==
- Notes and portraits of the French MPs under the Fifth Republic, French National Assembly
- 2012 French legislative elections: Charente-Maritime's 2nd constituency (first round and run-off), Minister of the Interior
