= Saint-Xandre =

- Commune
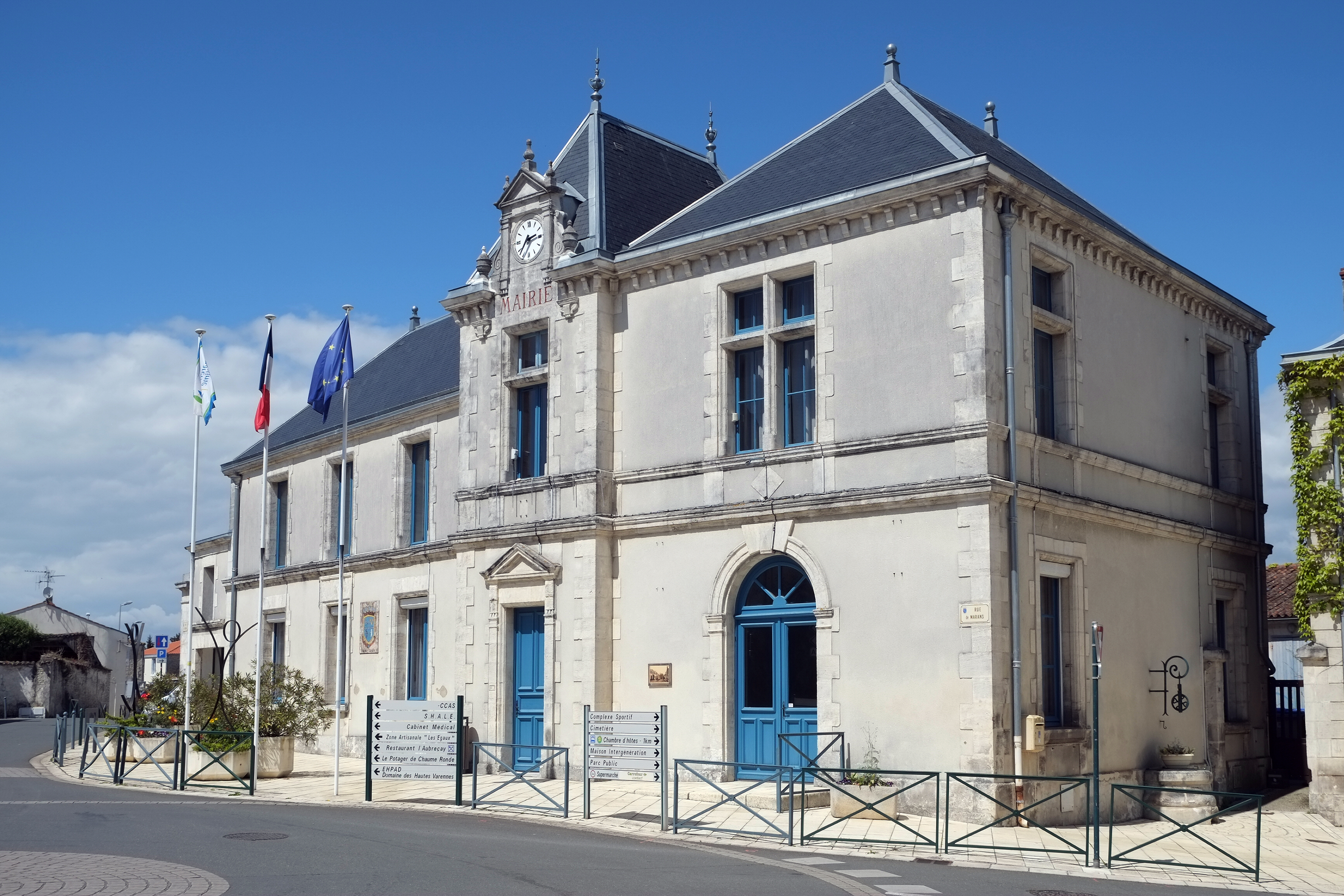
- The town hall in Saint-Xandre

- Coat of arms
- Location of Saint-Xandre
- Location within France Location within Nouvelle-Aquitaine
- Coordinates: 46°12′20″N 1°06′04″W
- Country: France
- Region: Nouvelle-Aquitaine
- Department: Charente-Maritime
- Arrondissement: La Rochelle
- Canton: Lagord
- Intercommunality: CA La Rochelle

Government
  - Mayor (2020–2026): Évelyne Ferrand
- Area^{1}: 13.29 km^{2} (5.13 sq mi)
- Elevation: 20 m (66 ft)
- Highest elevation: 37 m (121 ft)
- Lowest elevation: 1 m (3.3 ft)
- Population (2023): 5,677
  - Density: 427.2/km^{2} (1,106/sq mi)
- Time zone: UTC+01:00 (CET)
  - Summer (DST): UTC+02:00 (CEST)
- INSEE/Postal code: 17414 /17138
- ^{1} French Land Register data, which excludes lakes, ponds, glaciers > 1 km^{2} (0.386 sq mi or 247 acres) and river estuaries.

Saint-Xandre (French pronunciation: [sɛ̃ sɑ̃dʁ]) is a commune in the Charente-Maritime department in southwestern France.

== Population ==
Historical population
Year	Pop.	±% p.a.
1968	1,413	—
1975	2,135	+6.07%
1982	2,987	+4.91%
1990	3,279	+1.17%
1999	4,121	+2.57%
2007	4,519	+1.16%
2012	4,369	−0.67%
2017	4,848	+2.10%
2023	5,677	+2.67%
Source: INSEE

== See also ==
- Communes of the Charente-Maritime department
