= L'Houmeau =

- Commune
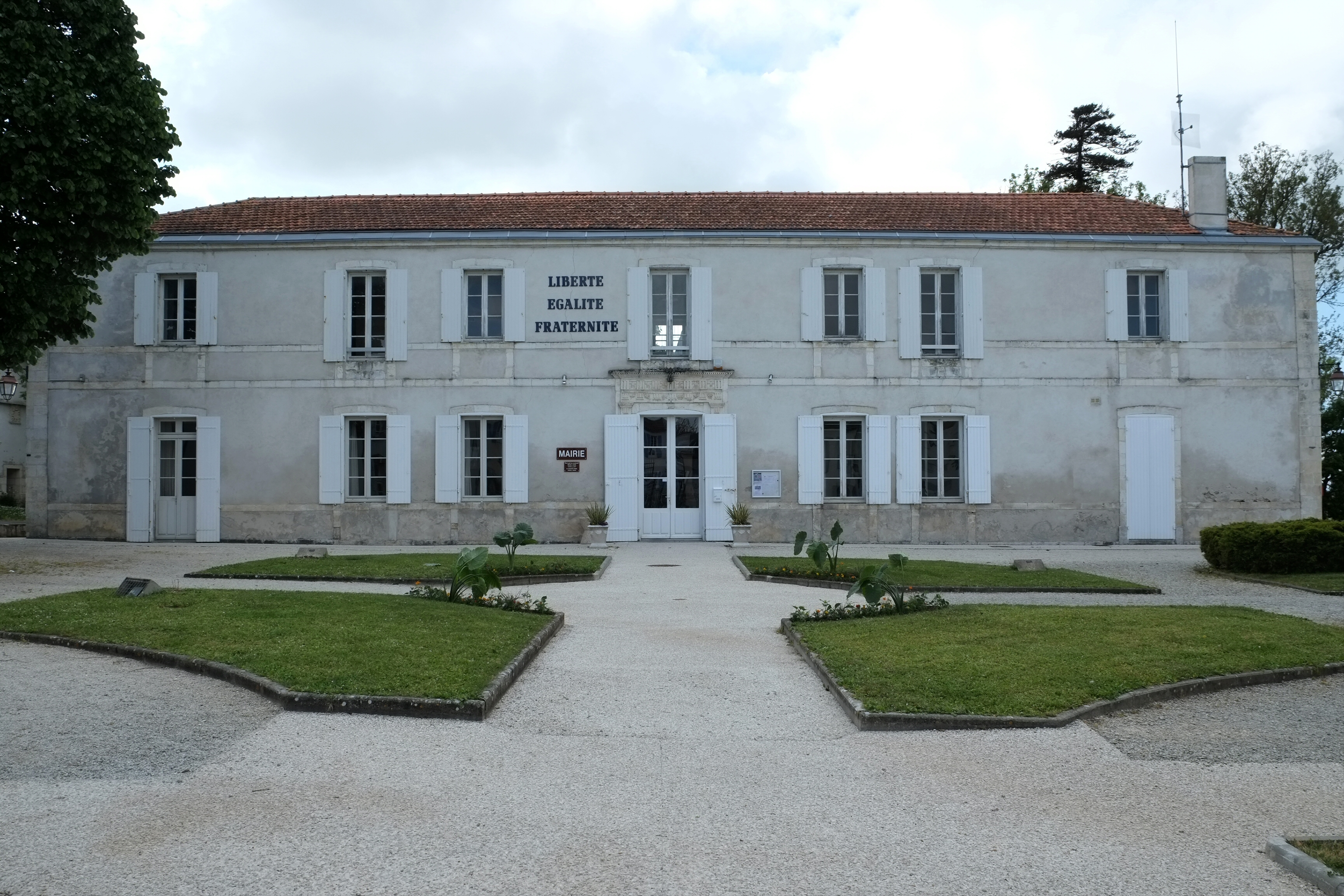
- The town hall in L'Houmeau
- Location of L'Houmeau
- Location within France Location within Nouvelle-Aquitaine
- Coordinates: 46°11′38″N 1°11′10″W
- Country: France
- Region: Nouvelle-Aquitaine
- Department: Charente-Maritime
- Arrondissement: La Rochelle
- Canton: Lagord
- Intercommunality: CA La Rochelle

Government
  - Mayor (2020–2026): Jean-Luc Algay
- Area^{1}: 4.22 km^{2} (1.63 sq mi)
- Elevation: 15 m (49 ft)
- Highest elevation: 29 m (95 ft)
- Lowest elevation: 0 m (0 ft)
- Population (2023): 3,000
  - Density: 710/km^{2} (1,800/sq mi)
- Time zone: UTC+01:00 (CET)
  - Summer (DST): UTC+02:00 (CEST)
- INSEE/Postal code: 17190 /17137
- ^{1} French Land Register data, which excludes lakes, ponds, glaciers > 1 km^{2} (0.386 sq mi or 247 acres) and river estuaries.

L'Houmeau (French pronunciation: [lumo]) is a commune in the Charente-Maritime department in southwestern France.

== Population ==
Historical population
Year	Pop.	±% p.a.
1968	807	—
1975	1,162	+5.35%
1982	1,725	+5.81%
1990	2,486	+4.67%
1999	2,279	−0.96%
2007	2,107	−0.98%
2012	2,655	+4.73%
2017	2,853	+1.45%
2023	3,000	+0.84%
Source: INSEE

== See also ==
- Communes of the Charente-Maritime department
