= Marsilly, Charente-Maritime =

Marsilly
- Commune
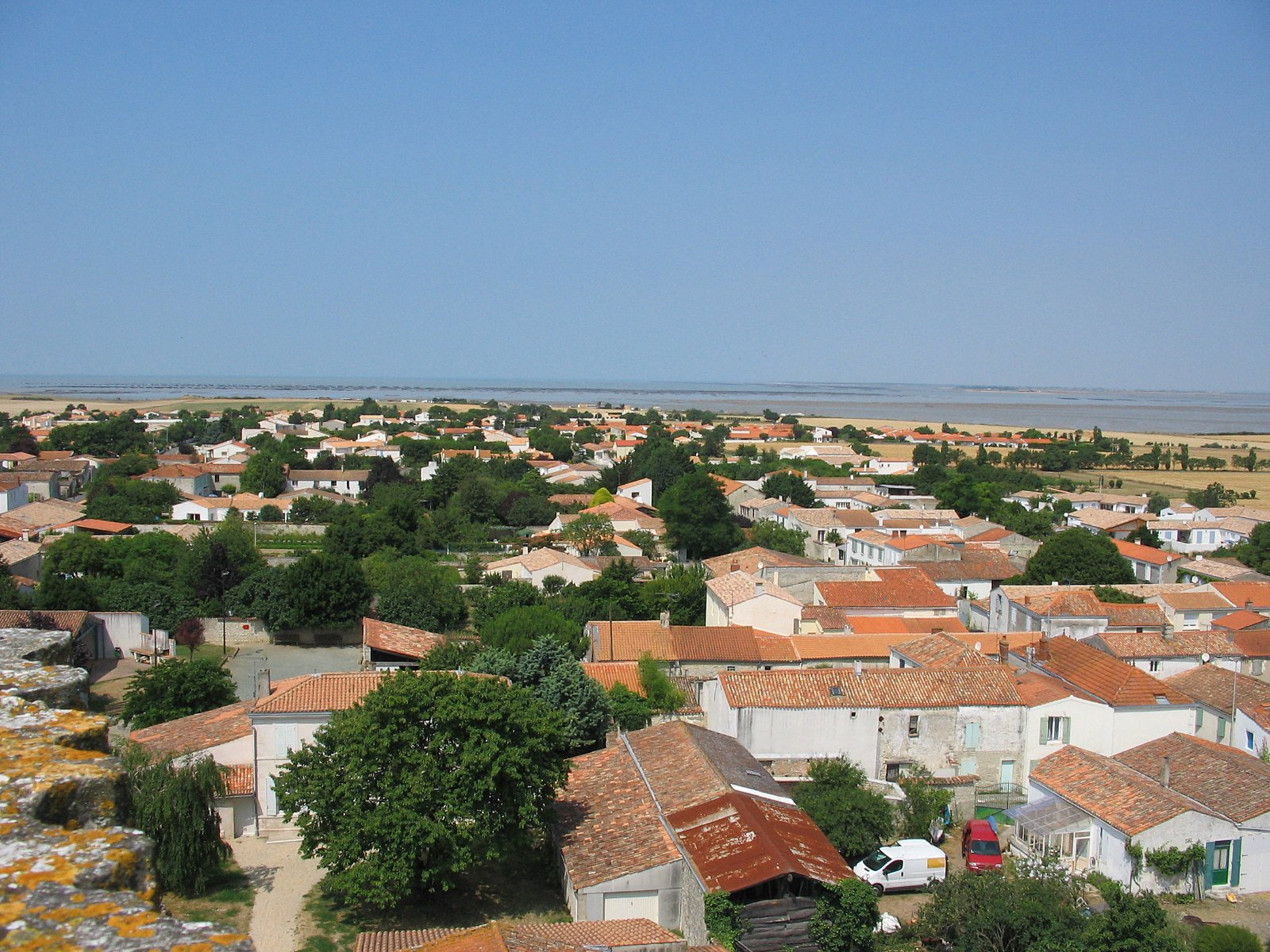
- A general view of Marsilly

- Coat of arms
- Location of Marsilly
- Location within France Location within Nouvelle-Aquitaine
- Coordinates: 46°13′53″N 1°08′12″W
- Country: France
- Region: Nouvelle-Aquitaine
- Department: Charente-Maritime
- Arrondissement: La Rochelle
- Canton: Lagord
- Intercommunality: CA La Rochelle

Government
  - Mayor (2020–2026): Hervé Pineau
- Area^{1}: 11.91 km^{2} (4.60 sq mi)
- Highest elevation: 31 m (102 ft)
- Lowest elevation: 0 m (0 ft)
- Population (2023): 3,176
  - Density: 266.7/km^{2} (690.7/sq mi)
- Demonym(s): Marsellois, Marselloise
- Time zone: UTC+01:00 (CET)
  - Summer (DST): UTC+02:00 (CEST)
- INSEE/Postal code: 17222 /17137
- ^{1} French Land Register data, which excludes lakes, ponds, glaciers > 1 km^{2} (0.386 sq mi or 247 acres) and river estuaries.

Marsilly (French pronunciation: [maʁsiji]) is a French commune in the department of Charente-Maritime, Nouvelle-Aquitaine, southwestern France.

== Population ==
Historical population
Year	Pop.	±% p.a.
1968	1,005	—
1975	1,467	+5.55%
1982	1,759	+2.63%
1990	1,926	+1.14%
1999	2,203	+1.50%
2007	2,471	+1.45%
2012	2,768	+2.30%
2017	3,045	+1.93%
2023	3,176	+0.70%
Source: INSEE

== Personalities ==
Between 1932 and 1936, the well-known writer Georges Simenon and his wife Régine lived at La Richardière, a 16th-century manor house in Marsilly. The house is evoked in Simenon's novel Le Testament Donadieu

== See also ==
- Communes of the Charente-Maritime department
