= Canton of Saint-Martin-de-Ré =

Coordinates: 46°10′37″N 1°20′03″W

Saint-Martin-de-Ré
- Former canton
- Interactive map of Saint-Martin-de-Ré
- Country: France
- Region: Nouvelle-Aquitaine
- Department: Charente-Maritime
- No. of communes: {{{nbcomm}}}
- Disbanded: 2015
- Area: 43.56 km^{2} (16.82 sq mi)
- Population (2012): 13,196
  - Density: 302.9/km^{2} (784.6/sq mi)

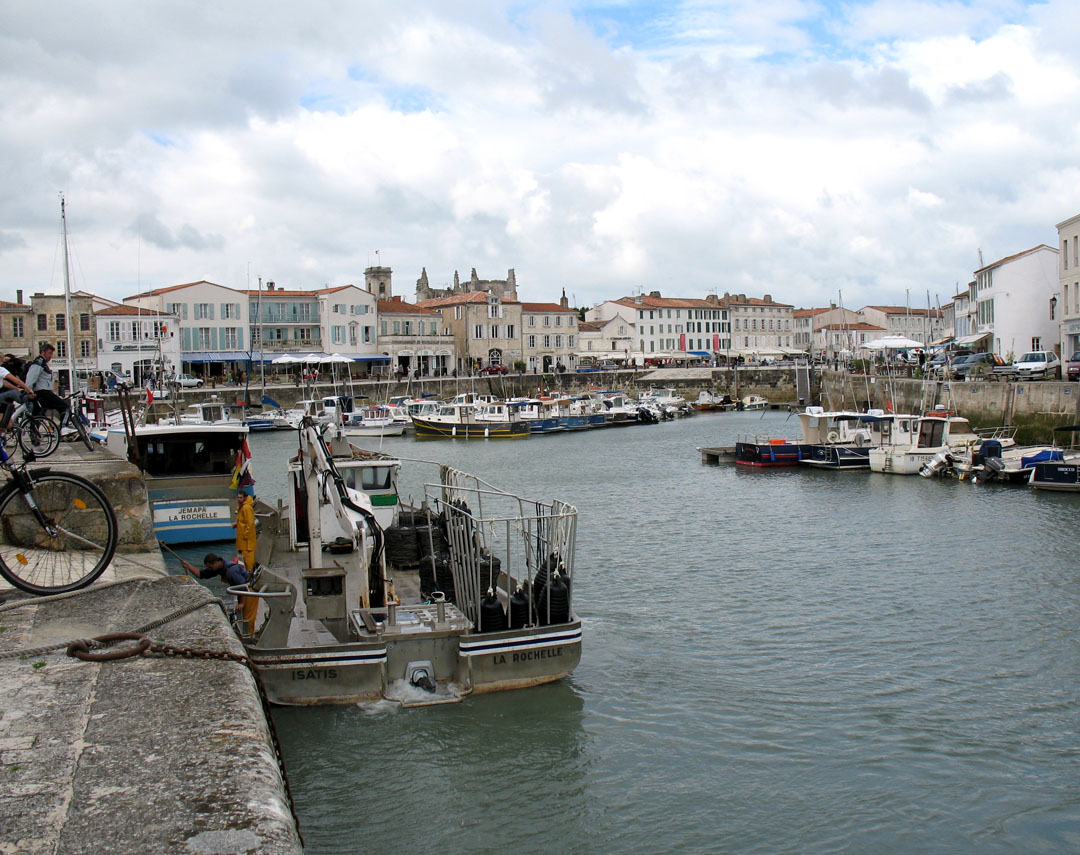
Saint-Martin-de-Ré, fishing port, main basin

The Canton of Saint-Martin-de-Ré is a French former administrative division located in Île de Ré, Charente-Maritime, Poitou-Charentes. It was disbanded following the French canton reorganisation which came into effect in March 2015. It consisted of 5 communes, which joined the new Canton of Île de Ré in 2015. Its chef-lieu was Saint-Martin-de-Ré. It had 13,196 inhabitants (2012).

== Geography ==
The canton was bordered by the pertuis Breton to the north, by the "strait of La Pallice" to the east and the sluice of Antioch to the south. To the west, it adjoined the canton of Ars-en-Ré by the commune of La Couarde-sur-Mer. Its altitude varied all the way from 0 m (La Flotte) to 17 m (Le Bois-Plage-en-Ré) with an average altitude of 8 m (about 8.8 yards high). The nature of its soil as the geology of the island are of the same origin than the one of Aunis, whose Île de Ré represents the western extension.

=== Administration ===
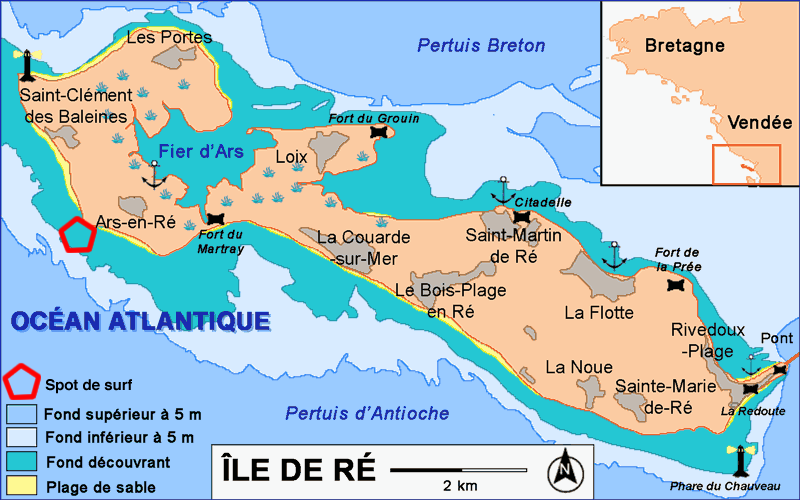
image_map of Île de Ré : physical geography and urbanization

The canton was located in the eastern part of Île de Ré and belonged to the arrondissement of La Rochelle. Its chef-lieu was the small port town of Saint-Martin-de-Ré. The canton comprised the following communes:

- Le Bois-Plage-en-Ré
- La Flotte
- Rivedoux-Plage
- Sainte-Marie-de-Ré
- Saint-Martin-de-Ré

== Politics ==
List of the general councillors (conseillers généraux) since 1906:

Period	Conseiller	Party	Occupation
1906–1920	Gustave Perreau	Parti radical	Mayor of La Rochelle (1925–1928), senator (1912–1939)
1920-	Jules Bernard		
-1979	André Chaigne	DVD	Mayor of Sainte-Marie-de-Ré (1959–1977)
1979–1985	Roland Vergnaud	DVD	Mayor of Rivedoux-Plage (1977–1983)
1985–present	Léon Gendre	UMP	Mayor of La Flotte since 1977, restaurateur

=== Elections: results (1979-2011) ===
==== 2011 ====
Candidate	Party	%	Votes
Léon Gendre	UMP	55,04 %	2929
Patrice Raffarin	DVD	44,96 %	2393

==== 2004 ====
Candidate	Party	%	Votes
Léon Gendre	UMP	50,5 %	3196
Thierry Poitte	DVD	19,7 %	1250
Claude Mossé	Verts	13,8 %	877
Elise Somprou	FN	6,5 %	415
Robert Grignon	DVD	5,5 %	347
Daniel Matifas	PCF	3,9 %	249

==== 1998 ====
Candidate	Party	%	Votes
Léon Gendre	RPR	58,9 %	2873
Alain Mercier	PRG	41,1 %	2003

==== 1992 ====
Candidate	Party	%	Votes
Léon Gendre	RPR	51,1 %	2351
Alain Mercier	MRG	48,9 %	2246

==== 1985 ====
Candidate	Party	%	Votes
Léon Gendre	RPR	43,0 %	1915
Paul Laidet	MRG	33,7 %	1498
Roland Vergnaud	DVD	23,3 %	1037

==== 1979 ====
Candidate	Party	%	Votes
Roland Vergnaud	DVD	55,1 %	1970
Léon Gendre	RPR	44,9 %	1607
