= La Flotte =

- Commune
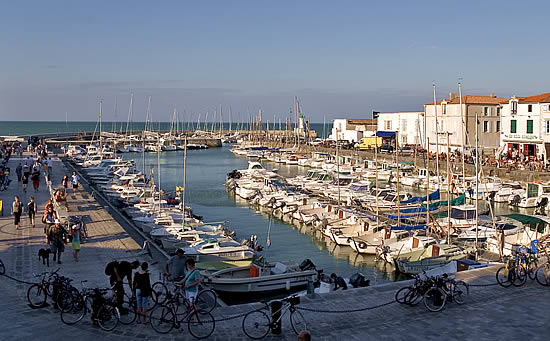
- The harbour in La Flotte

- Flag Coat of arms
- Location of La Flotte
- Location within France Location within Nouvelle-Aquitaine
- Coordinates: 46°11′16″N 1°19′28″W
- Country: France
- Region: Nouvelle-Aquitaine
- Department: Charente-Maritime
- Arrondissement: La Rochelle
- Canton: Île de Ré
- Intercommunality: Île de Ré

Government
  - Mayor (2020–2026): Jean-Paul Heraudeau
- Area^{1}: 12.32 km^{2} (4.76 sq mi)
- Elevation: 8 m (26 ft)
- Highest elevation: 17 m (56 ft)
- Lowest elevation: 0 m (0 ft)
- Population (2023): 3,150
  - Density: 256/km^{2} (662/sq mi)
- Demonym(s): Flottais, Flottaises
- Time zone: UTC+01:00 (CET)
  - Summer (DST): UTC+02:00 (CEST)
- INSEE/Postal code: 17161 /17630
- ^{1} French Land Register data, which excludes lakes, ponds, glaciers > 1 km^{2} (0.386 sq mi or 247 acres) and river estuaries.

La Flotte (French pronunciation: [la flɔt]), also known as La Flotte-en-Ré, is a commune on the Isle of Ré off the western coast of France, administratively part of the department of Charente-Maritime within the larger Nouvelle-Aquitaine region.

It is the largest municipality on the Île de Ré by area, and the second largest by population, second to Sainte-Marie-de-Ré on the southern tip of the island.

La Flotte was declared one of the most beautiful villages in France by the eponymous independent tourism organization Les Plus Beaux Villages de France, and since 2011, the town has been a part of the departmental government's "Stone and Water Villages" tourism initiative to promote notable coastal and waterfront locales (i.e., where the stone (city) meets the water (sea, river etc.).

== Geography ==
=== Town planning ===
The commune of La Flotte contains the town proper and a marina. La Flotte is an urban municipality, part of the urban unit of La Flotte, which also contains the commune of Saint-Martin-de-Ré. In addition, the municipality is part of the attraction area of La Flotte, covering 4 communes.

=== Coastline ===
The shoreline of La Flotte is bordered by small cliffs, and is home to Arnéult Beach, an artificial beach that has to be re-sanded each year.

As it is bordered by the Atlantic Ocean, La Flotte is a coastal municipality as defined by the Coastline Act (1986). As a result specific town planning provisions apply in order to preserve the natural spaces, sites, landscapes and the ecological balance of the coast, including a prohibition on construction along the coastline.

=== Land use ===
A sizable amount of the land in La Flotte is agricultural, 47% in 2018, down from 55.1% in 1990. The detailed breakdown in 2018 is as follows: forests (34.3%), permanent crops (18.3%), urbanized areas (17.9%), heterogeneous agricultural areas (15.9%), arable land (9.1%), meadows (3.7%), artificial green spaces, non-agricultural (0.5%), coastal wetlands (0.4%).

== Economic activity ==
- Agriculture, asparagus, potatoes, vine.
- Oyster farming, boating, fishing.
- Tourism. Accommodation: six hotels, five campsites, guest houses, seasonal rentals.

== History ==
In 1627, an English invasion force under the command of George Villiers, Duke of Buckingham, attacked the island in order to relieve the Siege of La Rochelle. After three months of siege, the Marquis de Toiras and a relief force of French ships and troops managed to repel the Duke, who was forced to withdraw in defeat. The English lost more than 4,000 out of 7,000 troops during the campaign. After repelling the English assault, the French Guards retreated through the town of La Flotte, and burned three English vessels there in the port and returned to Fort La Prée.

La Flotte was the home of Gustave Dechézeaux (1760-1794), a member of the National Convention. A victim of the Reign of Terror, he was guillotined at Rochefort on 17 January 1794 for his vote against the execution of Louis XVI. He was later given a posthumous pardon by the Convention on 3 May 1795.

== Government ==
=== Mayors ===
List of mayors
Term		Name	Occupation
1790	1791	Jean Henry-Laine	nobility
1791	1793	N J. Brizard-Durocq	merchant
1793	1793	Porsain Coursolle	merchant
1793	1794	Joshua Sibille	nobility
1794	1796	Hibry	merchant
1796	1802	Jacques Louis Rateau	merchant
1802	1805	Jean Pierre Derame	merchant
1805	1814	Pierre Valleau	merchant
1815	1825	Jean Pierre Derame	merchant
1826	1833	John Hector Lem	landlord
1834	1837	JJ Margotteau	merchant
1837	1852	Adrian Ponsin	doctor
1852	1855	Charles Villeneau	landlord
1855	1855*	Francois Maurice Gaussens	merchant
1855	1869	Sebastien Sibille-Lavertu	notary
1869	1870 **	Jean Emile Fourgnaud	doctor
1869	1870 **	Marc Brin	merchant
1869	1870 **	Etienne Margotteau	merchant
1870	1870 **	Charles Biret	notary
1870	1871	Jean Emile Fourgnaud	doctor
1871	1877	Aimed Napoleon Bos	draper
1877	1878	Charles Biret	notary
1878	1882	Aimed Napoleon Bos	draper
1882	1896	Camille Mague	landlord
1896	1928	Charles Biret	notary
1928	1935	Aristide Guignier	farmer
1935		Gaston Lem	
1947	1952	Eugene Chauffour	trader
1952	1959	Pierre Brochard	retired officer
1959	1971	Guy Margotteau	retired director of overseas France
1971	1977	Raymond Poncet	oyster farmer
1977	2020	Leon Gendre	hotelier, retired restaurateur, former general councilor
2020	Present	Jean-Paul Héraudeau	
* For 1855, municipal councilor acting as mayor. ** For the year 1870, from 21st of October to July, (Fourgnaud, Brin, Margotteau, Biret) municipal commission

=== 2008 municipal elections ===
1st round of 2008 elections
List driven by	Number of applicants	%	Voice (average of lists)	Elected
Leon Gendre	23	52.6%	1059	23
Jean-Paul Héraudeau	23	47.4%	953	

=== 2001 municipal elections ===
1st round of the 2001 election
List driven by	Number of applicants	%	Voice (average of lists)	Elected
Leon Gendre	23	100.0%	1188	23

=== 1995 municipal elections ===
1st round of 1995 elections
List driven by	Number of applicants	%	Voice (average of lists)	Elected
Leon Gendre	23	52.0%	824	15
Raymond Grassineau	23	48.0%	760	8

=== 1989 municipal elections ===
1st round of 1989 elections
List driven by	Number of applicants	%	Voice (average of lists)	Elected
Leon Gendre		49.4%	735	
James roy		27.0%	402	
Menanteau		23.6%	350	

== Demographics ==
Historical population

Year	Pop.	±% p.a.
1793	4,400	—
1800	3,322	−3.94%
1806	2,847	−2.54%
1821	2,556	−0.72%
1831	2,557	+0.00%
1836	2,411	−1.17%
1841	2,429	+0.15%
1846	2,462	+0.27%
1851	2,422	−0.33%
1856	2,352	−0.58%
1861	2,386	+0.29%
1866	2,450	+0.53%
1872	2,315	−0.94%
1876	2,395	+0.85%
1881	2,389	−0.05%
1886	2,381	−0.07%
1891	2,447	+0.55%
1896	2,373	−0.61%
1901	2,267	−0.91%

Year	Pop.	±% p.a.
1906	2,096	−1.56%
1911	2,118	+0.21%
1921	1,813	−1.54%
1926	1,629	−2.12%
1931	1,475	−1.97%
1936	1,396	−1.09%
1946	1,260	−1.02%
1954	1,393	+1.26%
1962	1,578	+1.57%
1968	1,681	+1.06%
1975	1,737	+0.47%
1982	1,878	+1.12%
1990	2,452	+3.39%
1999	2,737	+1.23%
2007	2,923	+0.83%
2012	2,863	−0.41%
2017	2,762	−0.72%
2023	3,150	+2.21%

Source: EHESS and INSEE (1968-2023)

== Culture and heritage ==
=== Places and monuments ===
- The Port: formerly a commercial port for wine and salt, then a fishing port. It is essentially a marina today. Its capacity is 200 berths on pontoons and 150 berths in organized moorings.
- The ruins of the Cistercian Abbey of Notre-Dame-de-Ré (between Rivedoux-Plage and La Flotte). The site has been classified as a “historic monument” since 21 May 1990.
- The Fort La Pree, built in 1625 and partially destroyed by Vauban in 1685.
- The Medieval Market.
- The Platin Museum, which has collections related to regional culture, Medieval architecture, and maritime history.
- The Church of St. Catherine Fleet (or "Church of St. Catherine of Alexandria") Built in the 15th century. Listed, in part, as a Historic Monument, in 1988.

=== Heraldry ===
Coat of Arms of La Flotte

== Notable people ==
- Nicolas Martiau (1591-1657), Huguenot settler, ancestor of George Washington and Robert E. Lee.
- Denis Goguet (1704-1778), merchant and shipowner
- Gustave Dechézeaux (1760-1794), French politician. Member of the National Convention, guillotined in 1794 during the Reign of Terror "for having conspired against the Republic", then posthumously pardoned in 1795.
- Jacques Gilles Henri Goguet (1767-1794), General
- Léon Gendre, general councilor of the canton of Saint-Martin-de-Ré (reelected in 2011), president of the Community of communes of the island of Ré from 1993 to 2008, mayor of La Flotte since 1977, ex-restaurateur (creator of the restaurant Le Richelieu).
- Roger Barberot (1915-2002) - Companion of the Liberation by decree of 7 March 1941, the most decorated sailor in France.

== See also ==
- Communes of the Charente-Maritime department
- Île de Ré
