= Les Portes-en-Ré =

- Commune
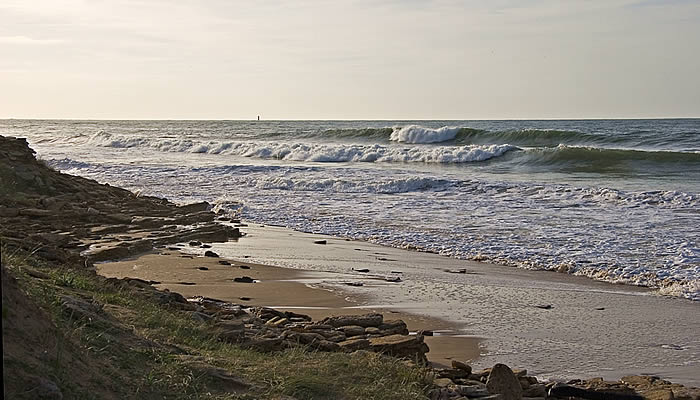
- Lizay beach at Les Portes-en-Ré
- Location of Les Portes-en-Ré
- Location within France Location within Nouvelle-Aquitaine
- Coordinates: 46°15′03″N 1°29′50″W
- Country: France
- Region: Nouvelle-Aquitaine
- Department: Charente-Maritime
- Arrondissement: La Rochelle
- Canton: Île de Ré
- Intercommunality: Île de Ré

Government
  - Mayor (2020–2026): Alain Pochon
- Area^{1}: 8.51 km^{2} (3.29 sq mi)
- Elevation: 3 m (9.8 ft)
- Highest elevation: 15 m (49 ft)
- Lowest elevation: 0 m (0 ft)
- Population (2023): 577
  - Density: 67.8/km^{2} (176/sq mi)
- Time zone: UTC+01:00 (CET)
  - Summer (DST): UTC+02:00 (CEST)
- INSEE/Postal code: 17286 /17880
- ^{1} French Land Register data, which excludes lakes, ponds, glaciers > 1 km^{2} (0.386 sq mi or 247 acres) and river estuaries.

Les Portes-en-Ré (French pronunciation: [le pɔʁt(z)‿ɑ̃ ʁe]) is a commune of southwestern France, located on the Ré Island, in the French department of Charente-Maritime, historical region of Poitou-Charentes, administrative region of Nouvelle-Aquitaine.

== Population ==
Historical population
Year	Pop.	±% p.a.
1968	424	—
1975	478	+1.73%
1982	513	+1.01%
1990	660	+3.20%
1999	661	+0.02%
2007	645	−0.31%
2012	622	−0.72%
2017	606	−0.52%
2023	577	−0.81%
Source: INSEE

== See also ==
- Île de Ré
- Communes of the Charente-Maritime department
