= Saint-Clément-des-Baleines =

- Commune
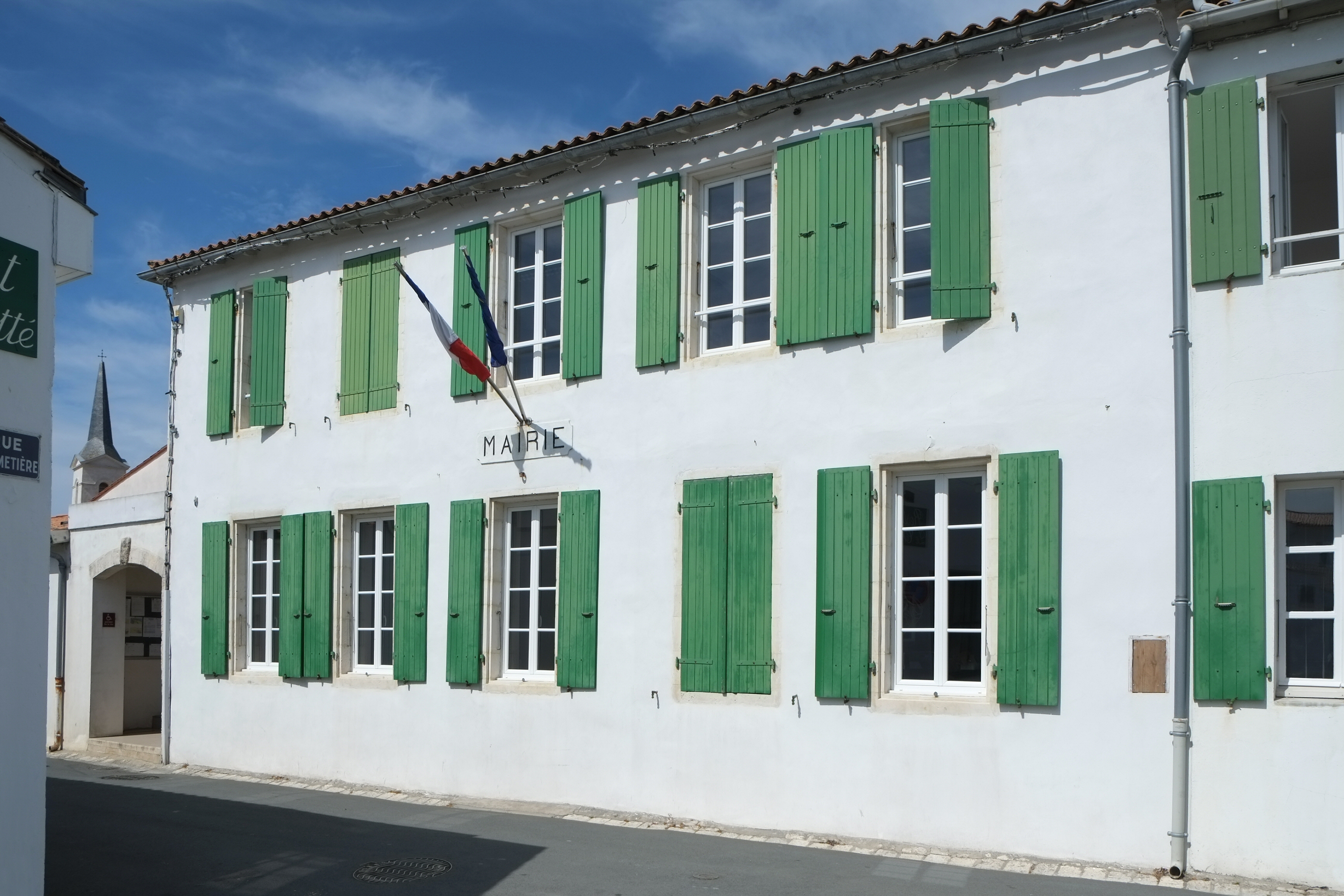
- The town hall in Saint-Clément-des-Baleines
- Location of Saint-Clément-des-Baleines
- Location within France Location within Nouvelle-Aquitaine
- Coordinates: 46°13′44″N 1°32′18″W
- Country: France
- Region: Nouvelle-Aquitaine
- Department: Charente-Maritime
- Arrondissement: La Rochelle
- Canton: Île de Ré
- Intercommunality: Île de Ré

Government
  - Mayor (2020–2026): Lina Besnier
- Area^{1}: 6.80 km^{2} (2.63 sq mi)
- Elevation: 4 m (13 ft)
- Highest elevation: 18 m (59 ft)
- Lowest elevation: 0 m (0 ft)
- Population (2023): 688
  - Density: 101/km^{2} (262/sq mi)
- Time zone: UTC+01:00 (CET)
  - Summer (DST): UTC+02:00 (CEST)
- INSEE/Postal code: 17318 /17590
- ^{1} French Land Register data, which excludes lakes, ponds, glaciers > 1 km^{2} (0.386 sq mi or 247 acres) and river estuaries.

Saint-Clément-des-Baleines (French pronunciation: [sɛ̃ klemɑ̃ de balɛn]) is a commune on Île de Ré, a coastal island in the French department of Charente-Maritime, located in the region of Nouvelle-Aquitaine (formerly Poitou-Charentes).

== Population ==
Historical population
Year	Pop.	±% p.a.
1968	490	—
1975	480	−0.29%
1982	516	+1.04%
1990	607	+2.05%
1999	728	+2.04%
2007	724	−0.07%
2012	692	−0.90%
2017	644	−1.43%
2023	688	+1.11%
Source: INSEE

== Geography ==
This commune has no harbor. Five villages are aggregated in: Le Gillieux, Le Chabot, La Tricherie, Le Griveau, Le Godinand. It was named according to mass whale strandings happened on the sandbank at the northwestern side of the island during their migrations. The Phare des Baleines is located on the western tip of Île de Ré.

== See also ==
- Communes of the Charente-Maritime department
