= Ars-en-Ré =

- Commune
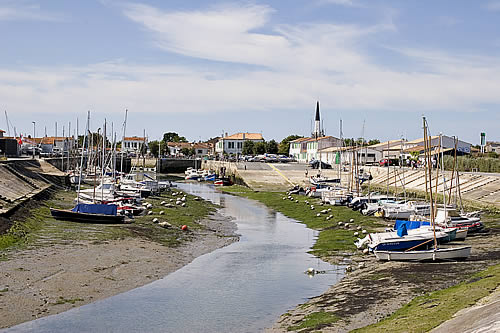
- The anchorage in Ars-en-Ré

- Coat of arms
- Location of Ars-en-Ré
- Location within France Location within Nouvelle-Aquitaine
- Coordinates: 46°12′29″N 1°30′57″W
- Country: France
- Region: Nouvelle-Aquitaine
- Department: Charente-Maritime
- Arrondissement: La Rochelle
- Canton: Île de Ré
- Intercommunality: CC Île Ré

Government
  - Mayor (2020–2026): Danièle Pétiniaud-Gros
- Area^{1}: 10.95 km^{2} (4.23 sq mi)
- Elevation: 6 m (20 ft)
- Highest elevation: 15 m (49 ft)
- Lowest elevation: 0 m (0 ft)
- Population (2023): 1,314
  - Density: 120.0/km^{2} (310.8/sq mi)
- Demonym: Casserons
- Time zone: UTC+01:00 (CET)
  - Summer (DST): UTC+02:00 (CEST)
- INSEE/Postal code: 17019 /17590
- ^{1} French Land Register data, which excludes lakes, ponds, glaciers > 1 km^{2} (0.386 sq mi or 247 acres) and river estuaries.

Ars-en-Ré (French pronunciation: [aʁs ɑ̃ ʁe]) is a commune on the Île de Ré in the western French department of Charente-Maritime, in Nouvelle-Aquitaine. Formerly called just Ars, the commune changed to its current name on 8 March 1962.

== Geography ==
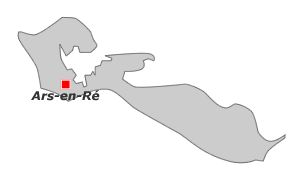
Location of Ars on the île de Ré

Ars-en-Ré is one of 10 communes located on the Île de Ré off the coast of La Rochelle and is in the north-western part of the island some 8 km west of Saint-Martin-de-Ré. Access to the commune is by the D735 road which crosses to the island from the end of National Highway N237 at La Rochelle. The D735 passes along the north coast of the island through Saint-Martin-de-Ré and continues north-west to the commune passing through the town and continuing north-west to the Baleines Lighthouse. Apart from the town there is the village of La Grange nearby on the coast and Le Martray to the east along the coast. The town occupies the centre of the commune and there are forests on the western side with the rest of the commune farmland including extensive salt farms.

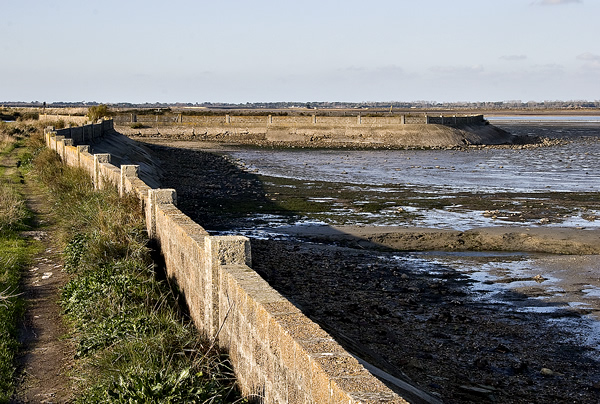
Dyke on the edge of the Fier d'Ars

Its harbour is the largest on the Île de Ré and is located at the bottom of the Fier d'Ars (a body of water penetrating the land from the north-east and bordered by marshes), which is reached by a channel through the salt farms. A lock closes the tidal basin which has 250 berths. A new basin with 130 berths is to be created in future at the channel entrance. There are 150 moorings on buoys in the outer harbour and the channel has a capacity of 550 berths, mainly dedicated to pleasure craft. A beach on the south coast of the island, bordered by a dyke to protect the land, extends to the Baleines Lighthouse at the western tip of the island.

== History ==
The Prince of Soubise was defeated here in 1624.

The port was important during the "salt era" until the beginning of the 20th century. The gabelle or salt tax was significant in the area.

=== Heraldry ===
Arms of Ars-en-Ré	Blazon: Or semé-de-lis azure, a galley gules.

== Administration ==
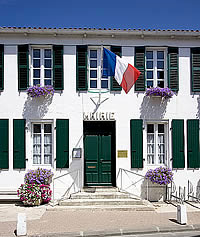
The Town Hall of Ars-en-Ré

List of Successive Mayors

From	To	Name	Party
1959	1966	Jacques Moinet	
1983	1995	Emile Gaudin	UDF
1995	2020	Jean-Louis Olivier	UMP
2020	2026	Danièle Pétiniaud Gros	

== Demography ==
The inhabitants of the commune are known as Arsais or Arsaises in French, but they are nicknamed the Casserons: the casseron is a baby cuttlefish, a saltwater fish commonly found on the island.

Historical population

Year	Pop.	±% p.a.
1793	3,600	—
1800	3,643	+0.17%
1806	3,602	−0.19%
1821	3,612	+0.02%
1831	3,875	+0.71%
1836	3,609	−1.41%
1841	3,668	+0.32%
1846	3,700	+0.17%
1851	4,043	+1.79%
1856	3,776	−1.36%
1861	3,547	−1.24%
1866	3,486	−0.35%
1872	3,171	−1.57%
1876	2,012	−10.75%
1881	2,034	+0.22%
1886	2,024	−0.10%
1891	1,897	−1.29%
1896	1,727	−1.86%
1901	1,560	−2.01%

Year	Pop.	±% p.a.
1906	1,434	−1.67%
1911	1,392	−0.59%
1921	1,173	−1.70%
1926	1,113	−1.04%
1931	1,045	−1.25%
1936	984	−1.20%
1946	854	−1.41%
1954	919	+0.92%
1962	913	−0.08%
1968	915	+0.04%
1975	961	+0.70%
1982	1,023	+0.90%
1990	1,165	+1.64%
1999	1,294	+1.17%
2007	1,315	+0.20%
2012	1,297	−0.28%
2017	1,307	+0.15%
2023	1,314	+0.09%

Source: EHESS and INSEE

== Sites and Monuments ==
The village is a member of Les Plus Beaux Villages de France (the most beautiful villages in France).

Since 2011 the commune has belonged to the network "Villages of stone and water", a label initiated by the General Council to promote exceptional sites with the distinction of being located near a body of water (sea, river, pond ...).

=== Civil Heritage ===
Ars-en-Ré has a number of buildings that have been registered as historical monuments by the Ministry of Culture. These are:

- Windmills (17th-18th century)
- Houses (16th-20th century)
- Guardhouse at Place Carnot (18th century)
- War Memorial at Place Carnot (1925)
- Jules Perrier Museum at Place de la Chapelle (19th century)
- Salt Refinery at Rue de Mouillebarbe (19th century)
- Two Salt Works on Rue Mouillebarbe (19th century)
- Tower at Batterie-Karola (1942-1944)
- Kora-Karola Artillery Battery which was part of the German Atlantic Wall (military area).
- Fort of Le Martray (1674)

There are over 200 items in Ars-en-Ré that are registered as historical objects, several of which are in private collections.

Other sites of interest

- The Port with its new tidal basin at the entrance of the access channel.
- Le Martray, the narrowest point of the island.
- The Fiers d'Ars
- Salt farms
- The old station of the Petit train de l'Île de Ré (1898) at the port.
- The surfing spot at Grignon Point.

=== Religious Heritage ===
Many religious buildings and monuments are registered as historical monuments at the Ministry of Culture:

- The Priory of Saint-Étienne in the Place Carnot (11th-17th centuries) The Priory contains a very large number of items that are registered as historical objects.
- The Convent of the Sisters of Wisdom at Rue du Havre (1862)
- A Monumental Cross at the Port (1899)
- A Monumental Cross on the Route de Saint-Clément (1836)
- The Pinaud Cross on the Route de Saint-Clément (destroyed)(17th century)
- A Monumental Cross on N735 (1890)
- The Church of Saint-Étienne (12th century). Its bell tower, painted in black and white, serves as a Daymark for sailors.
- The Convent of the Sisters of Charity (18th century)
- The Protestant Church (destroyed) (1603)

=== Ars-en-Ré Picture Gallery ===
Ars-en-Ré

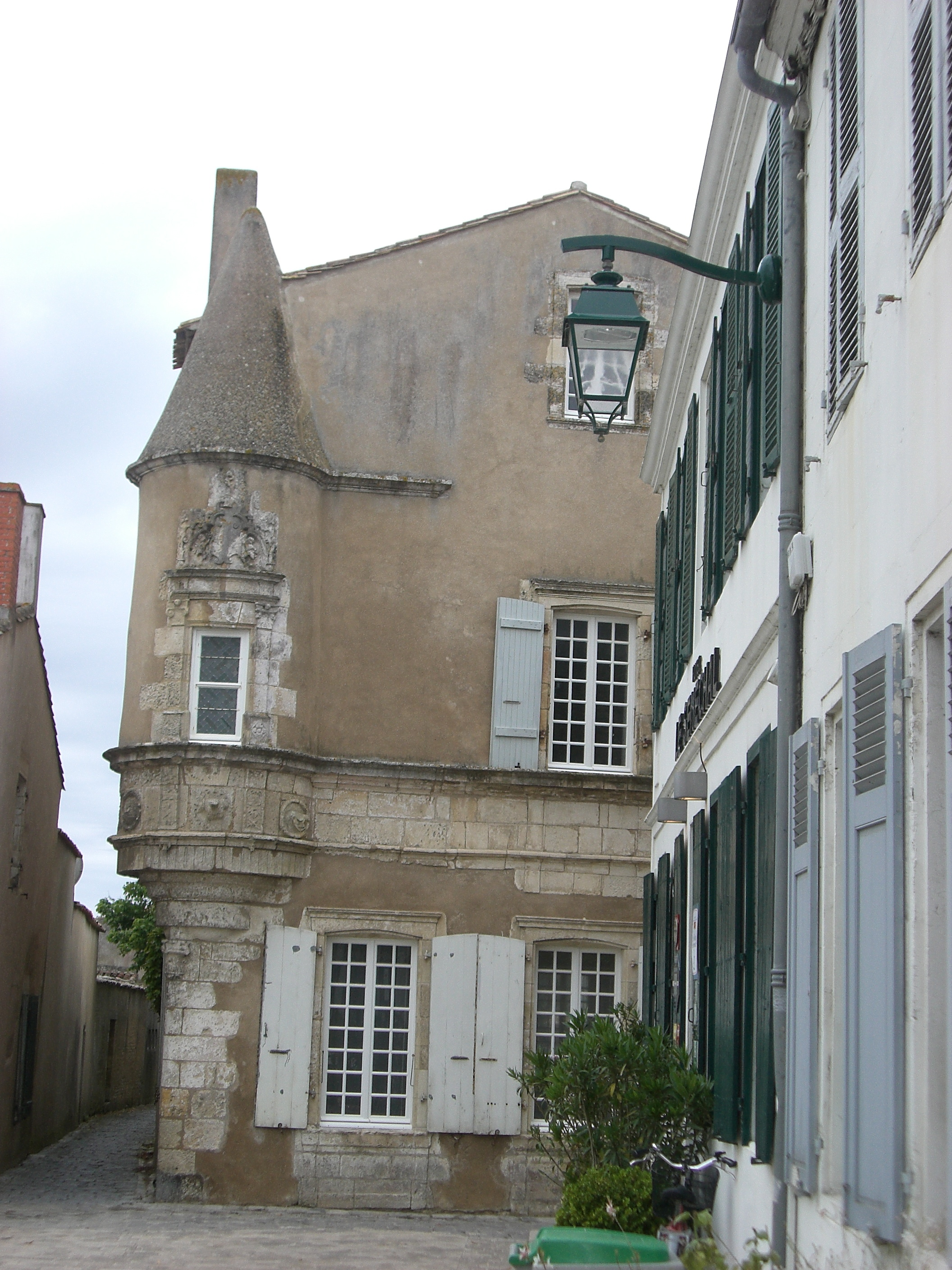
16th century House in the town

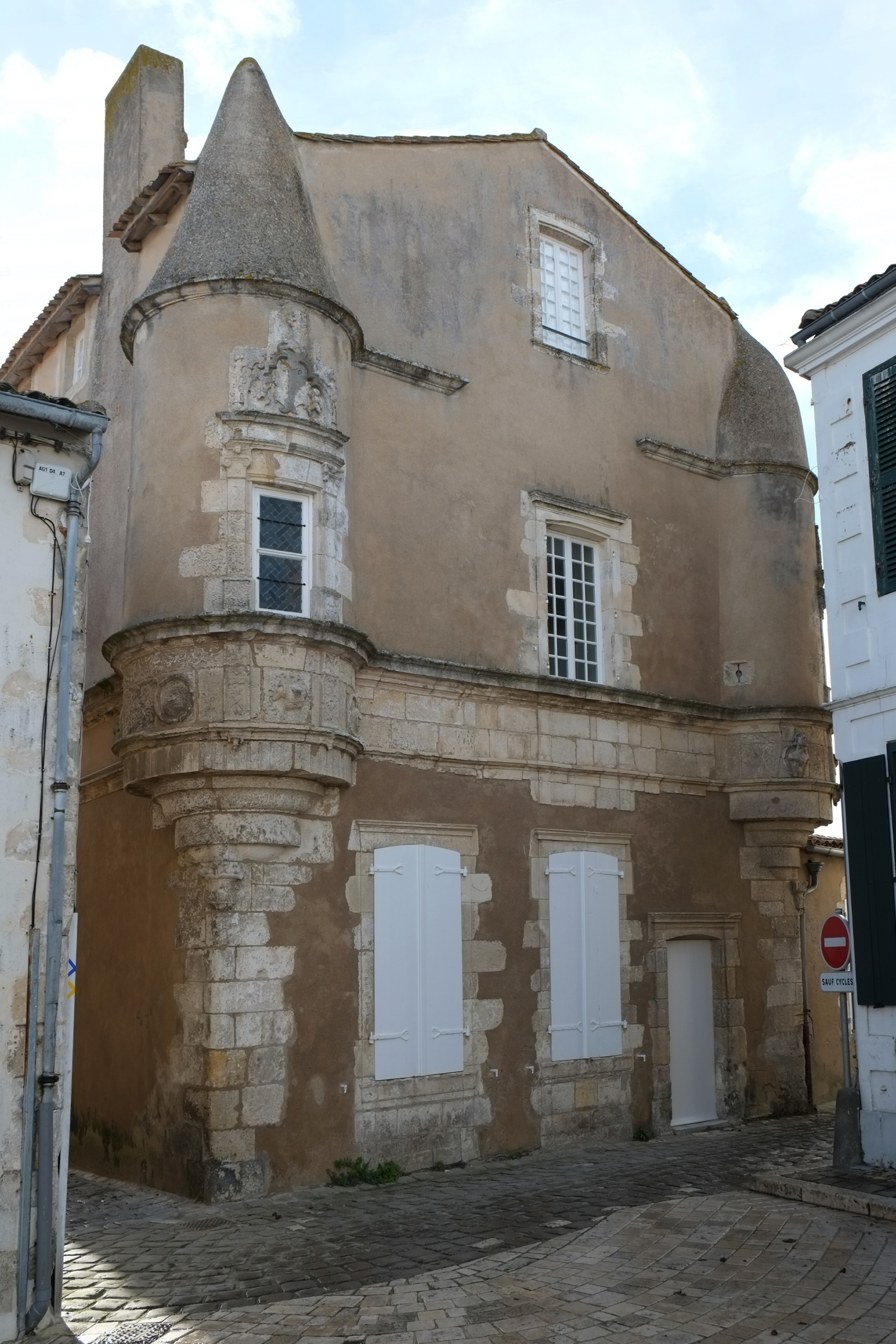
The Seneschal House

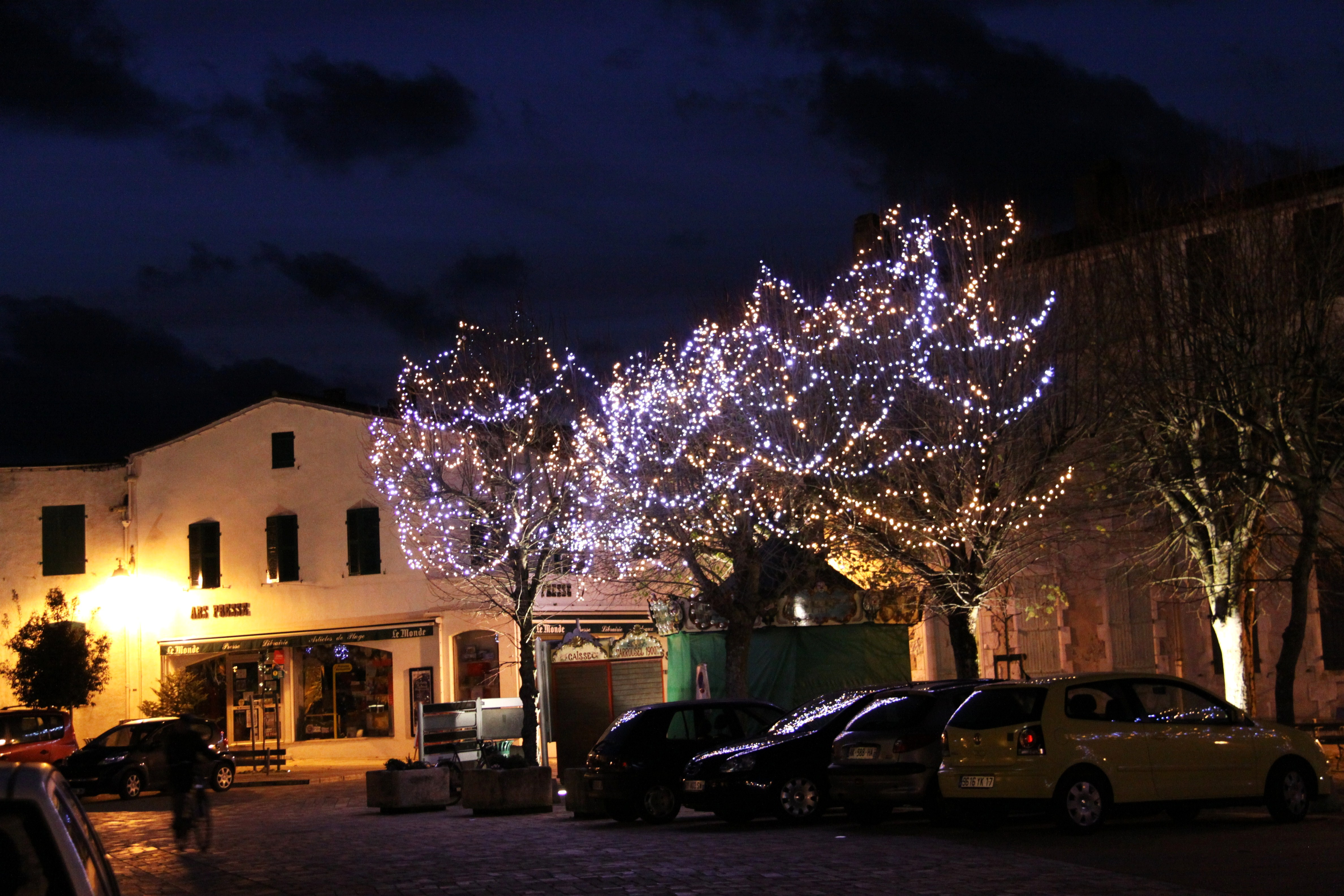
Christmas lights

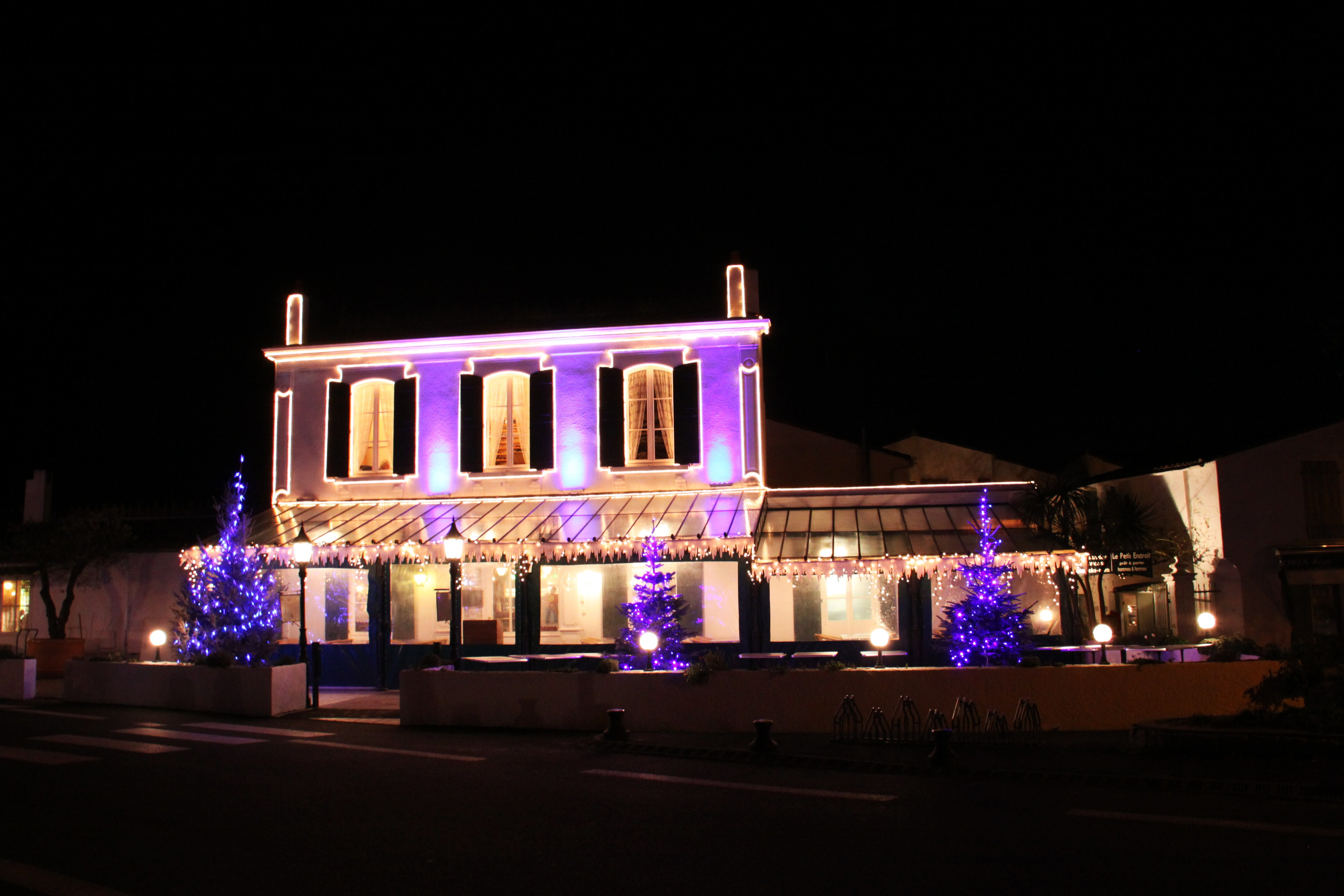
Christmas lights

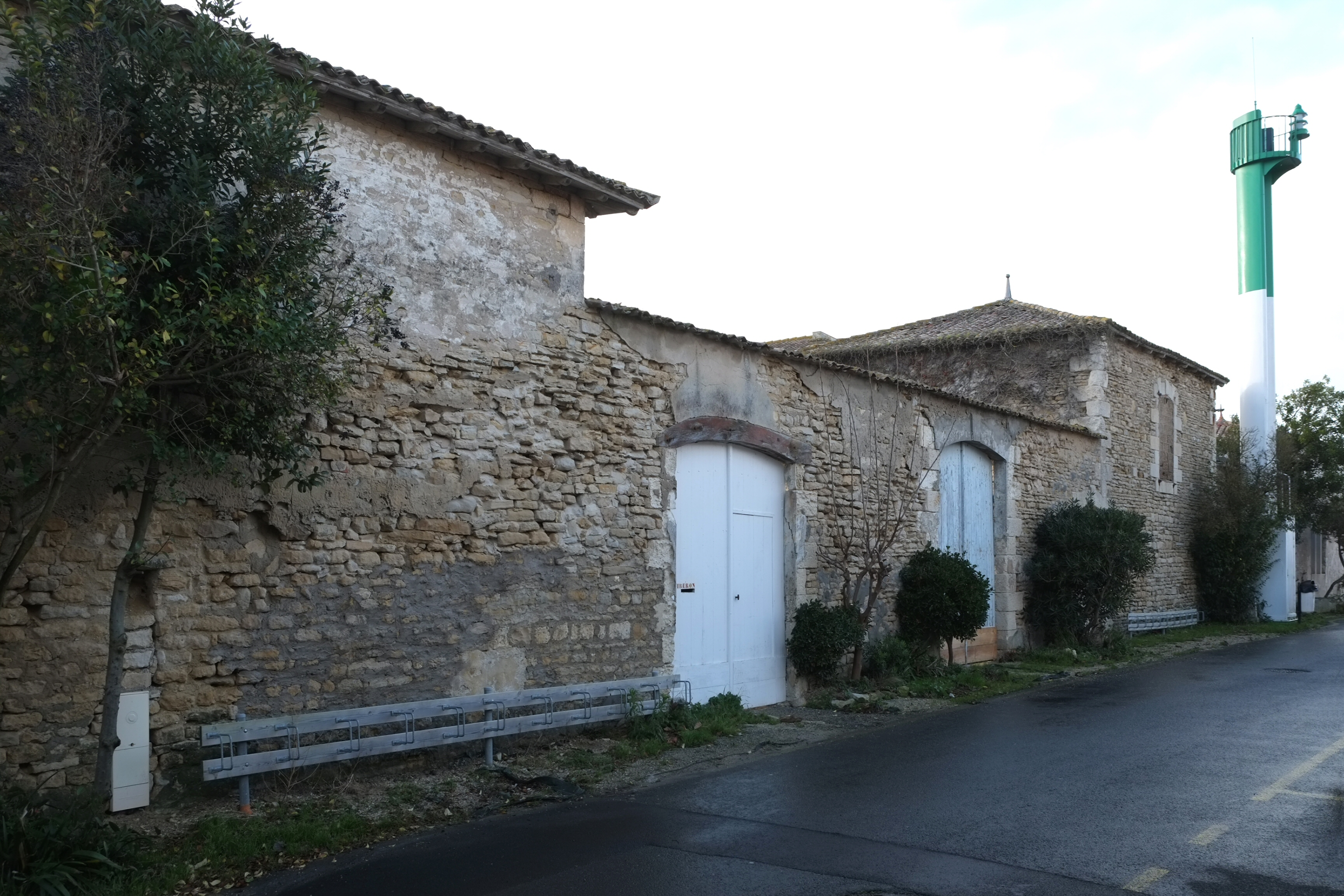
The old salt refinery

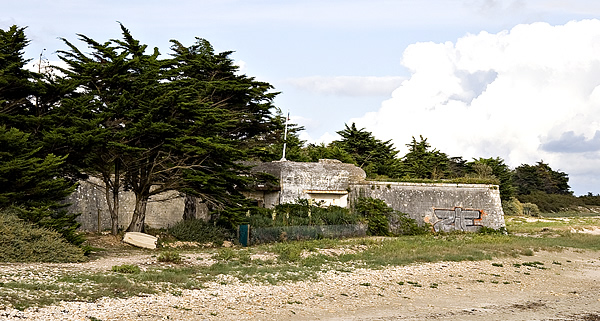
Le Martray Fort

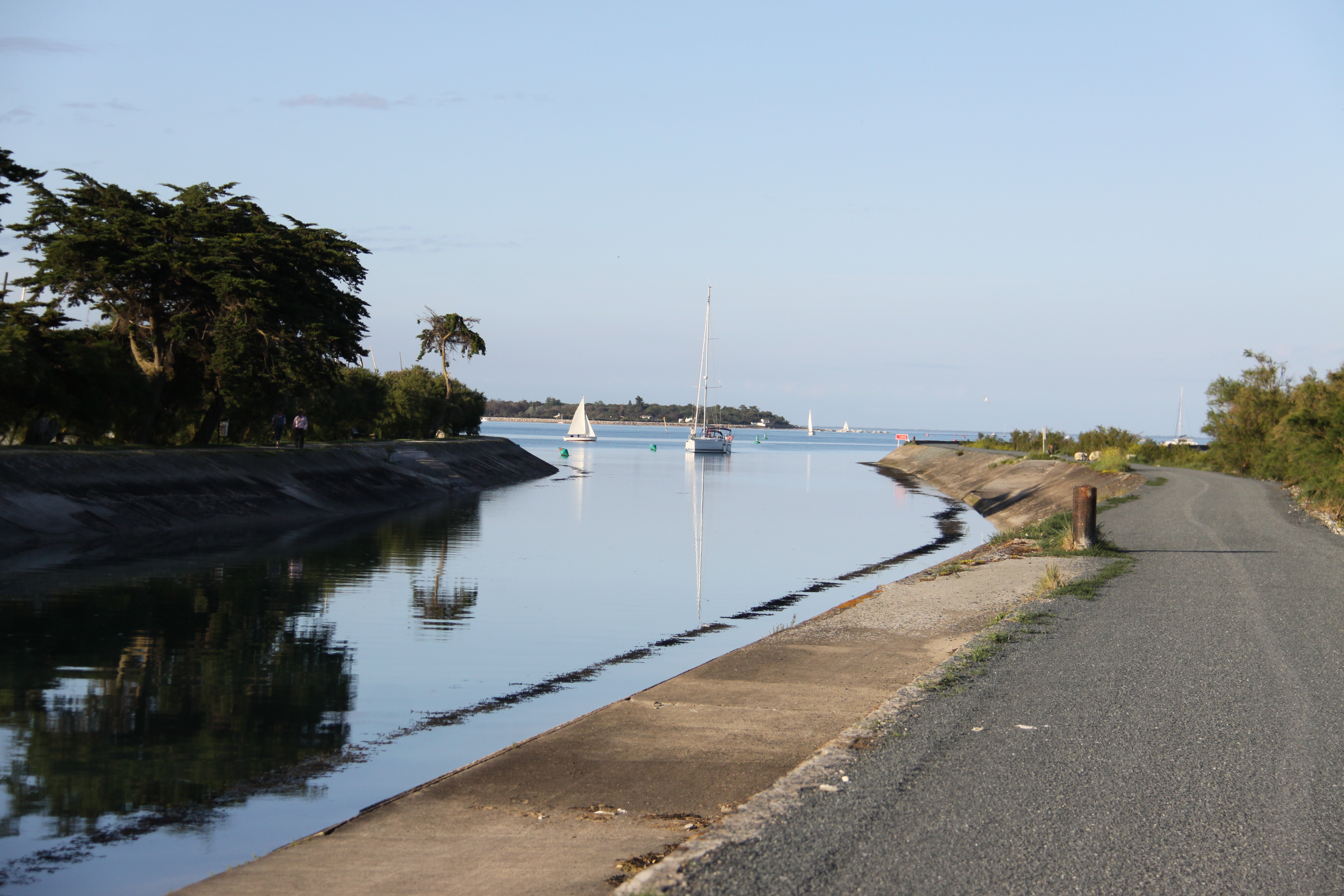
The channel giving access to the Fier d'Ars

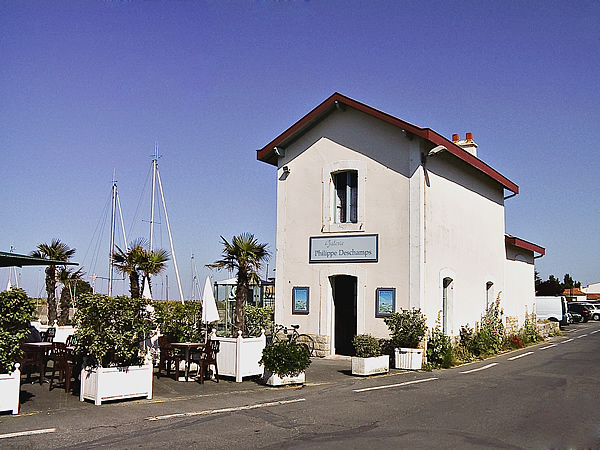
The old railway station

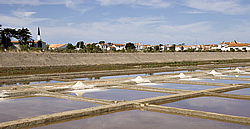
Salt ponds

The Church

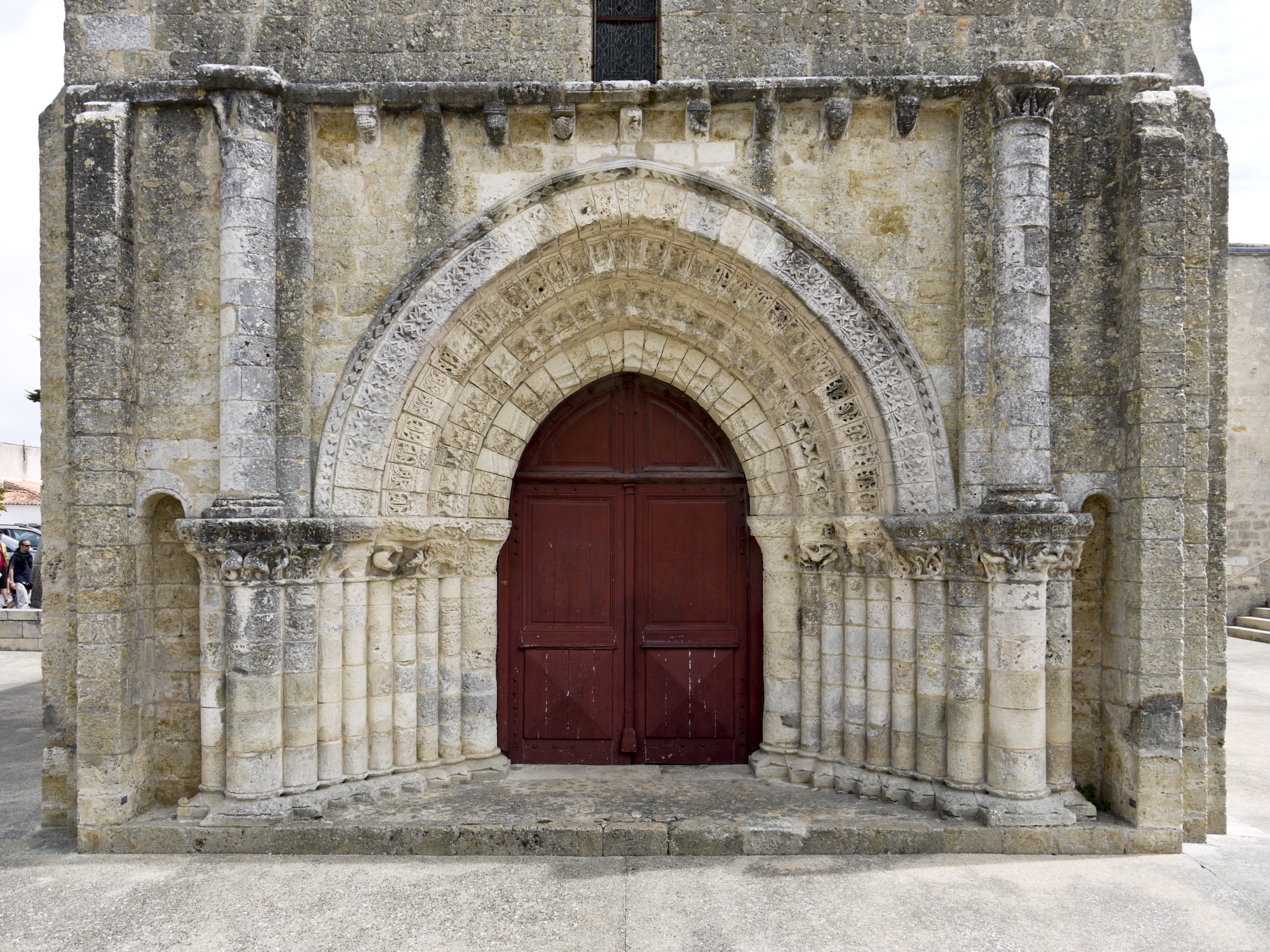
Church entrance

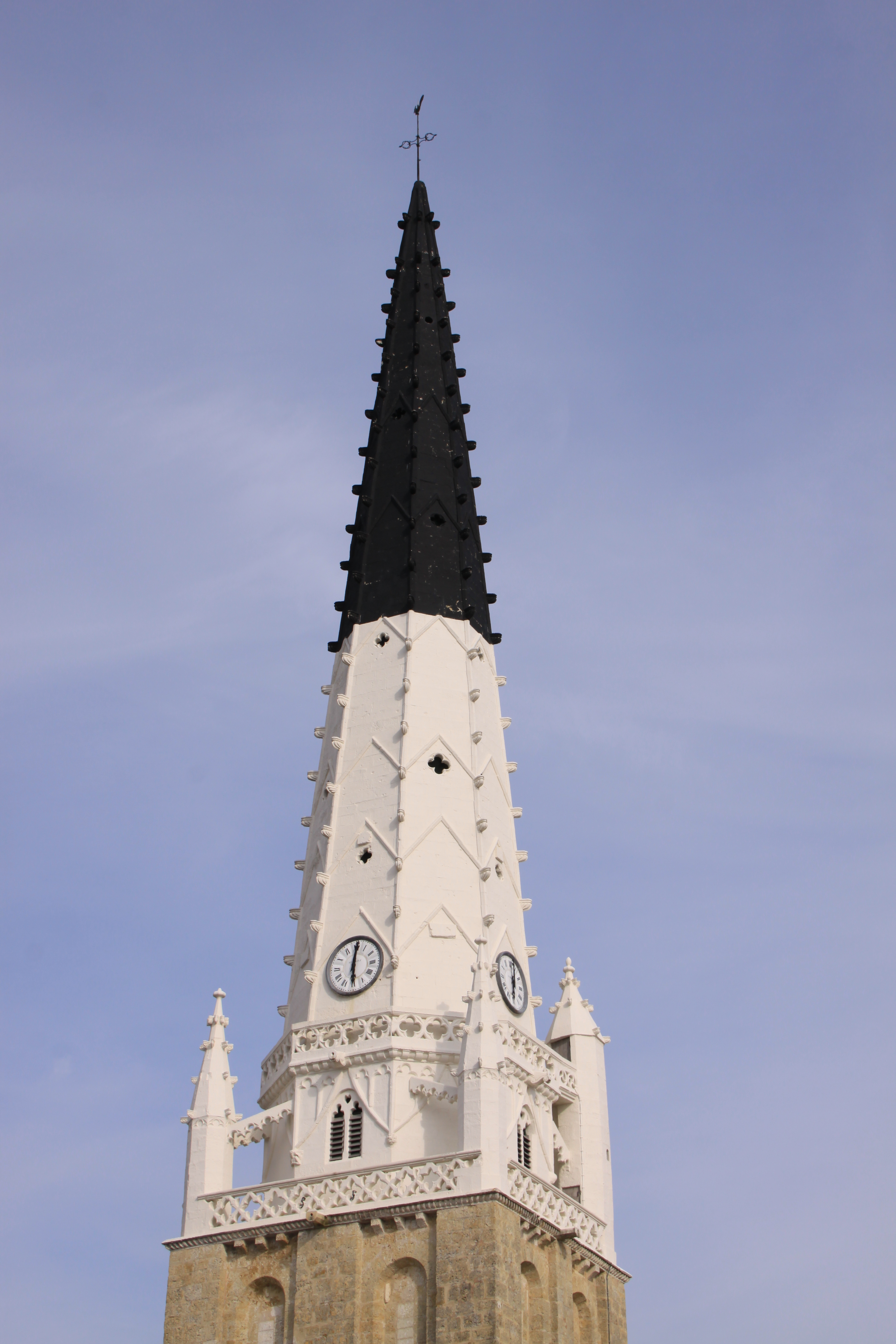
The Church steeple

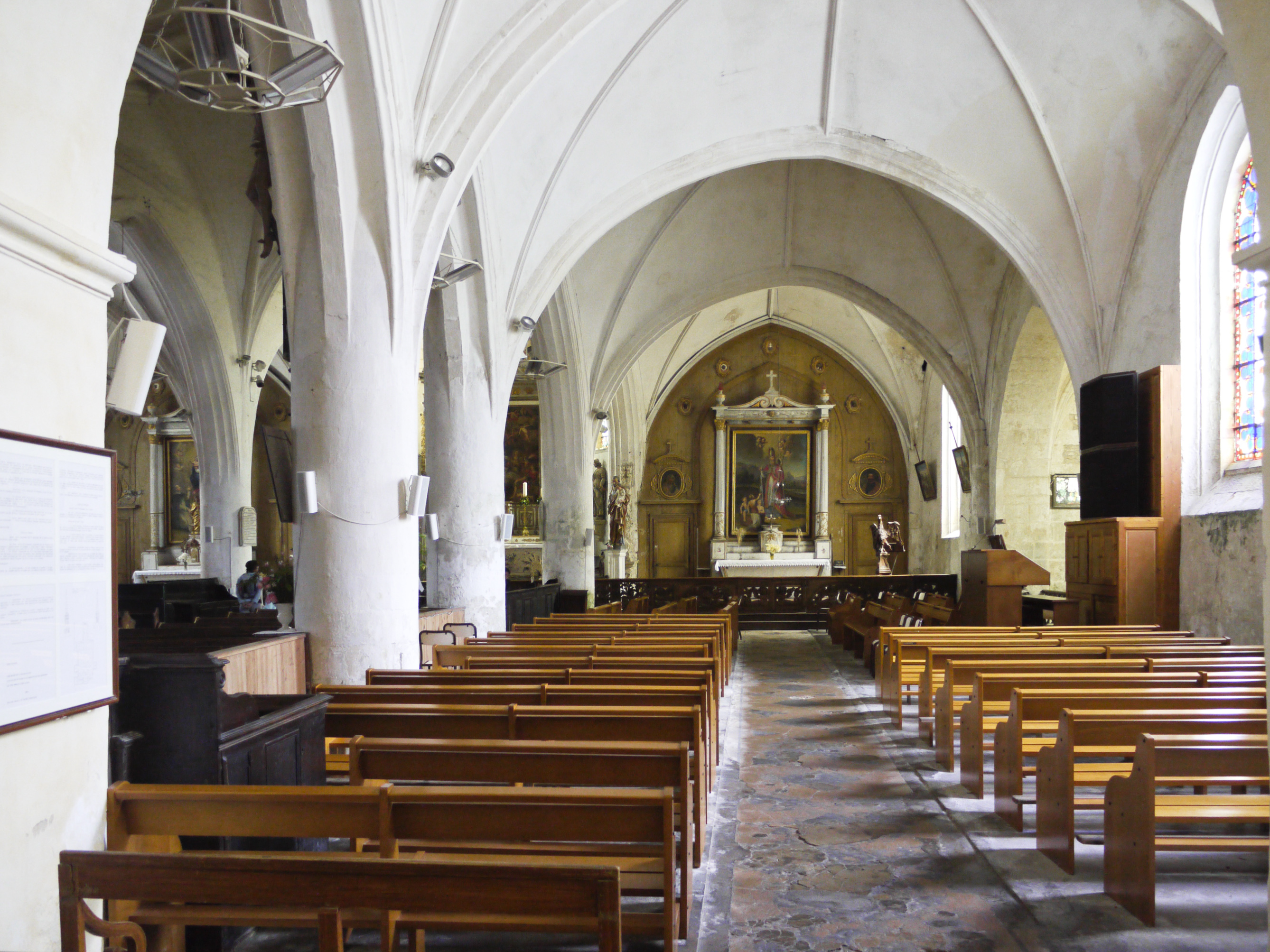
The Nave

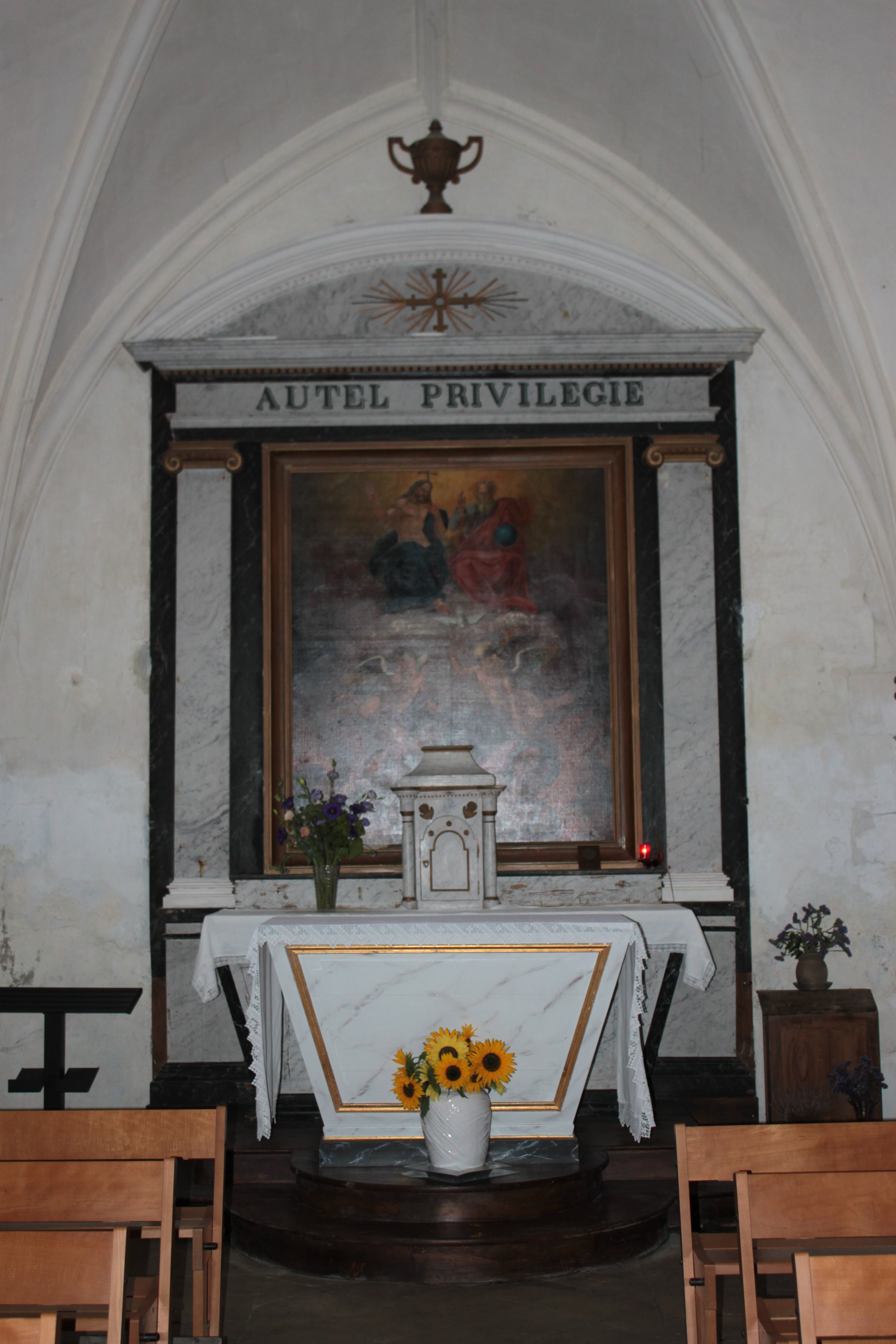
The Altar

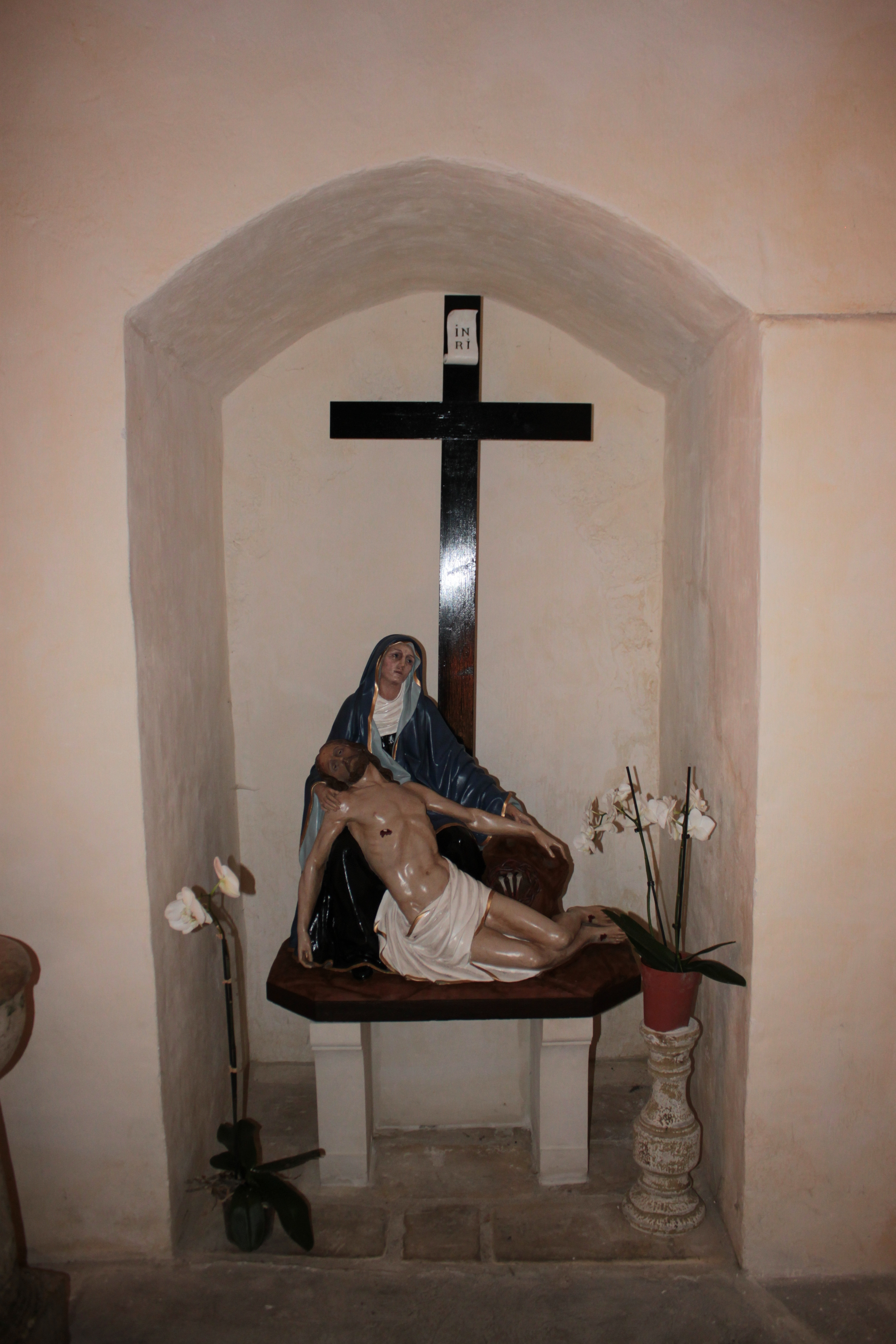
Pieta in the church

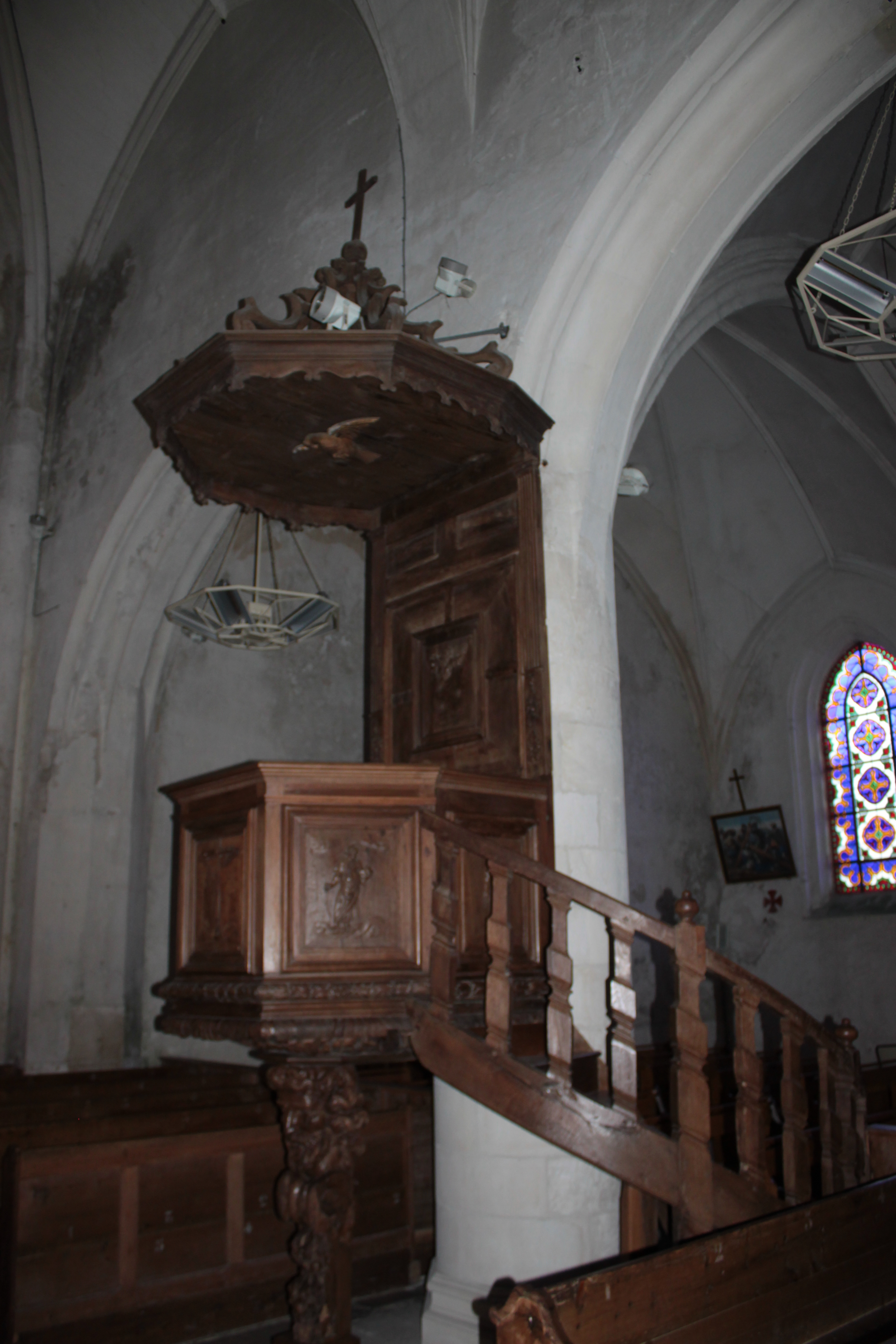
The pulpit

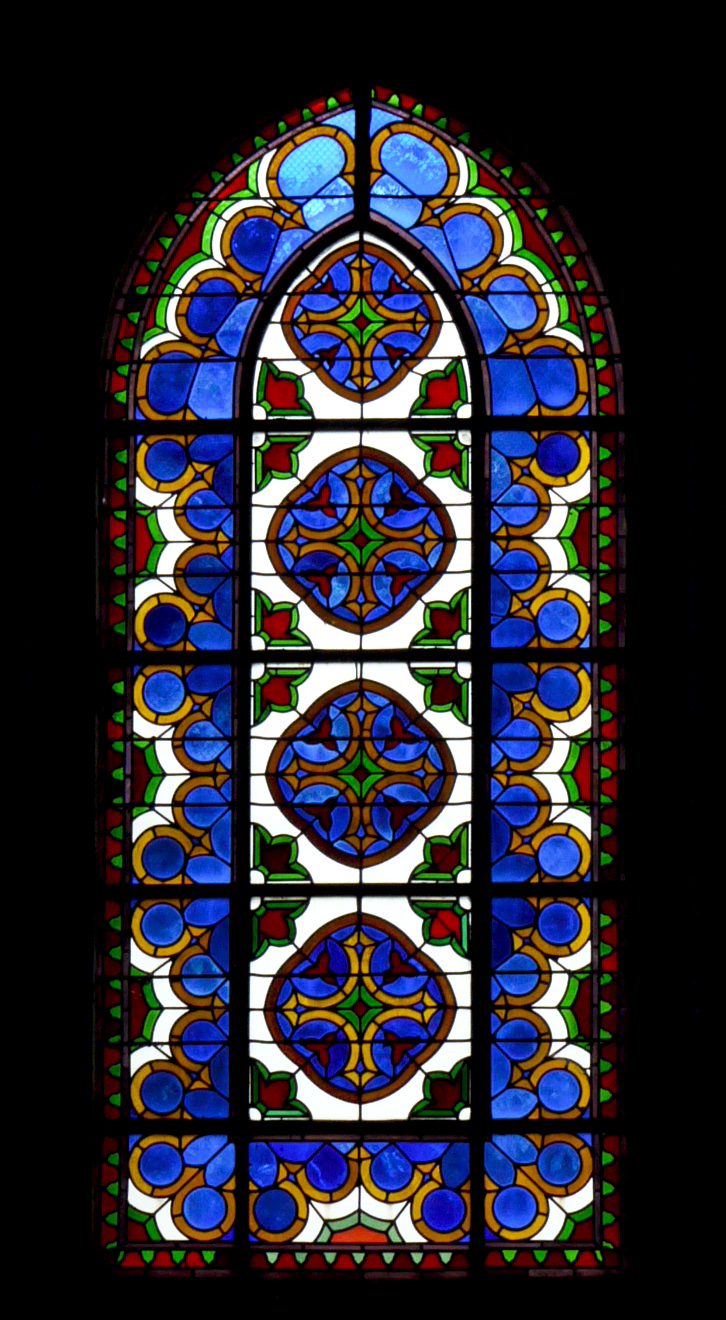
Stained Glass window

Birds

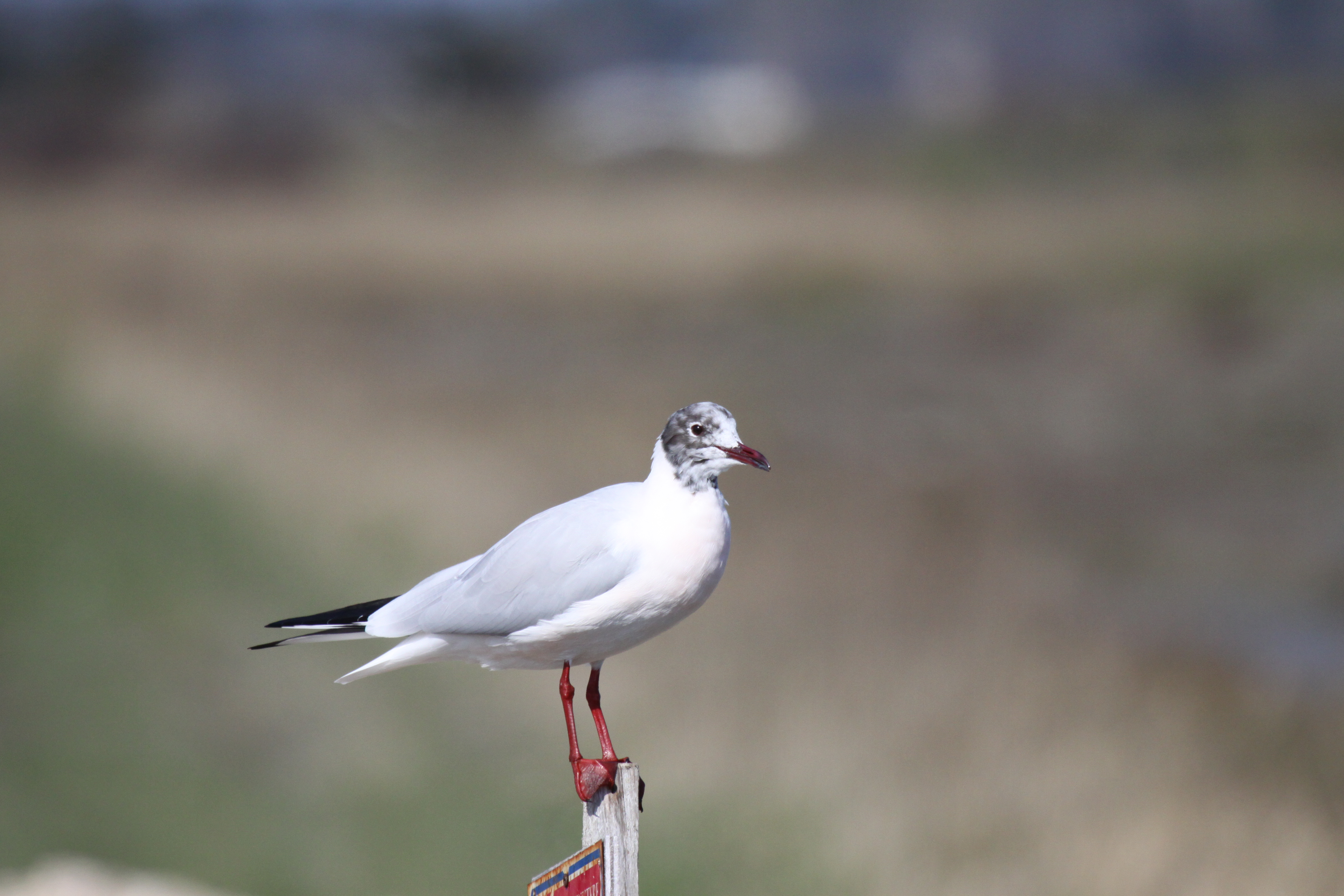
Seagull

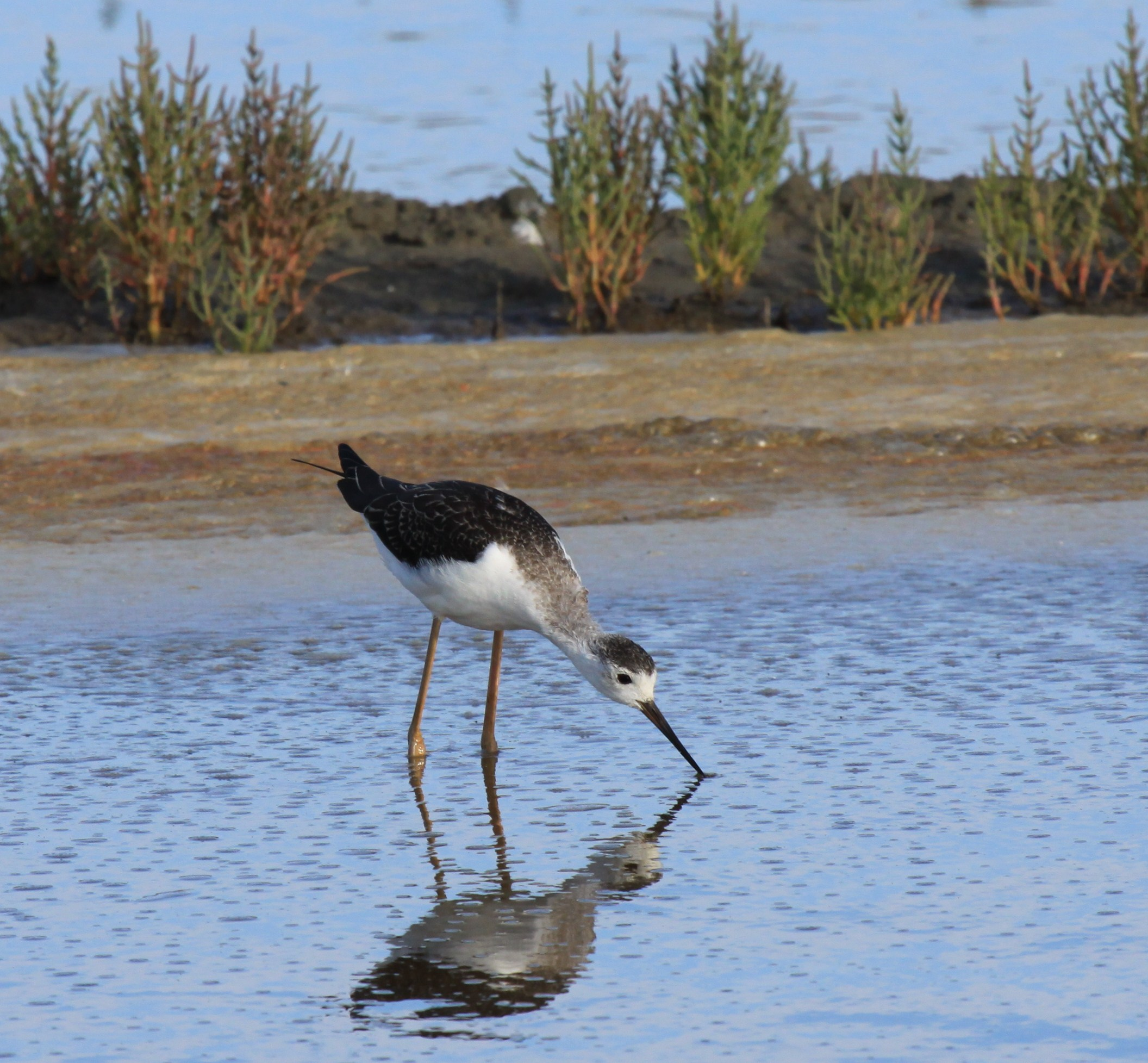
White stilt

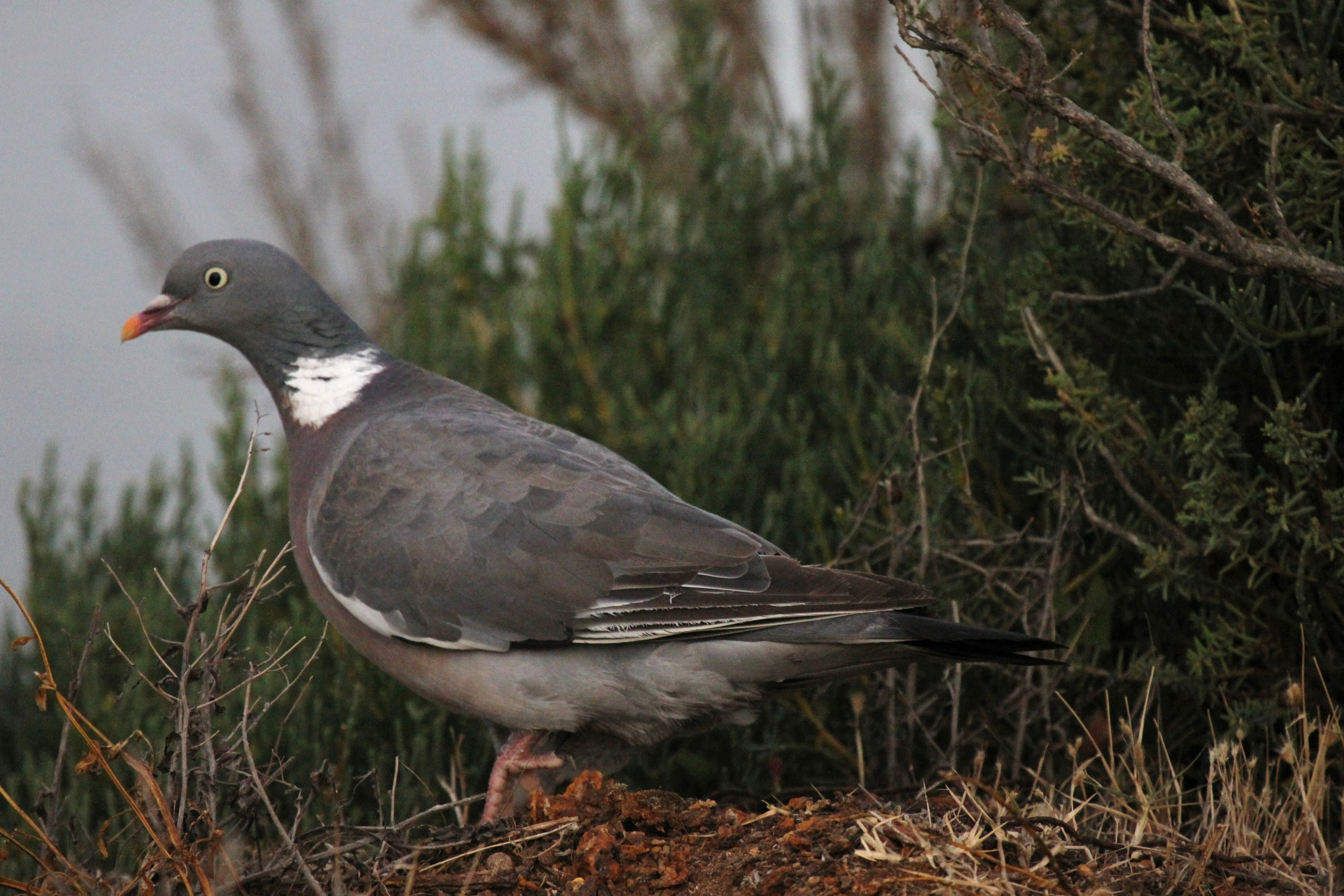
Wood pigeon

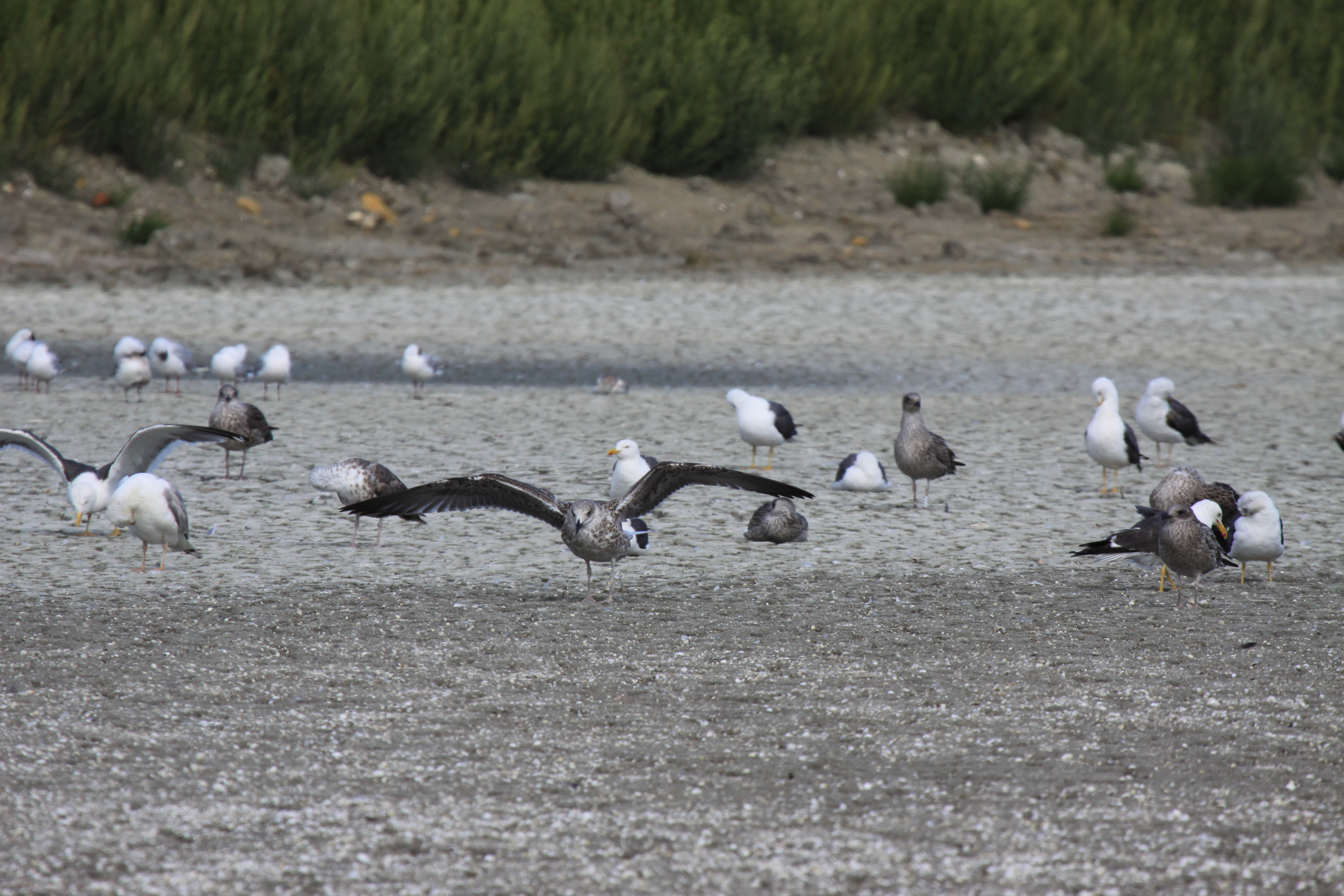
Brown seagulls

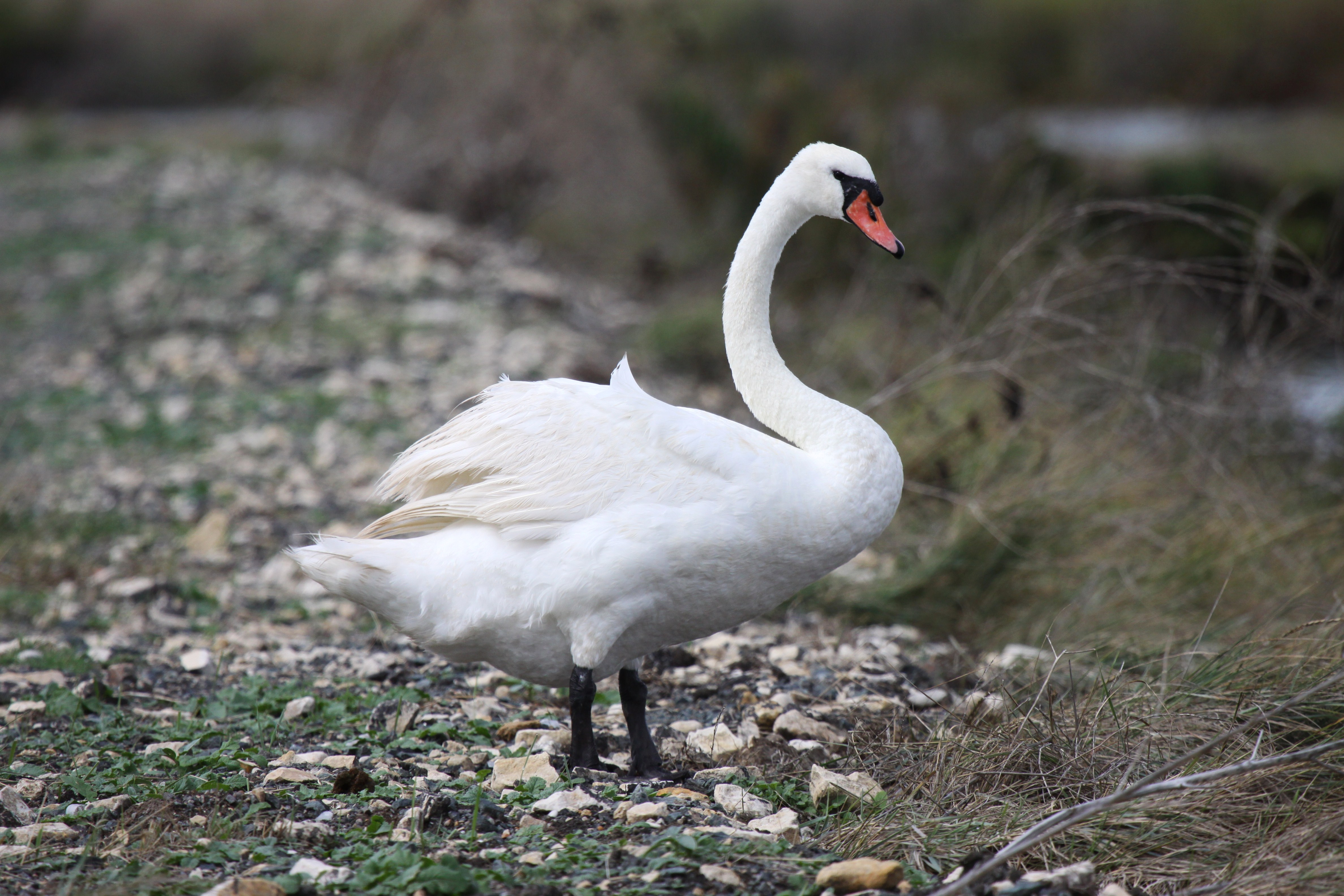
Swan

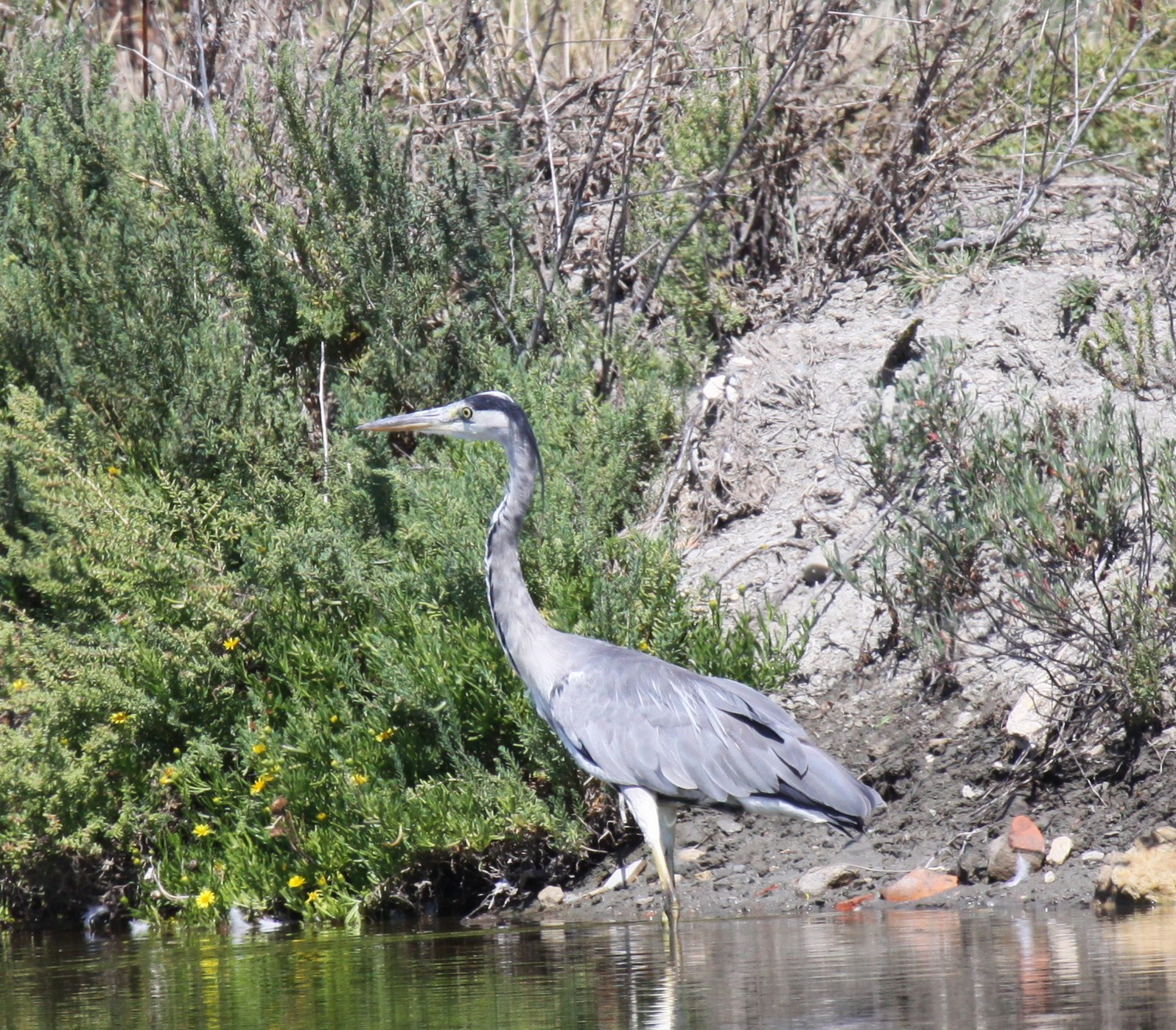
Heron

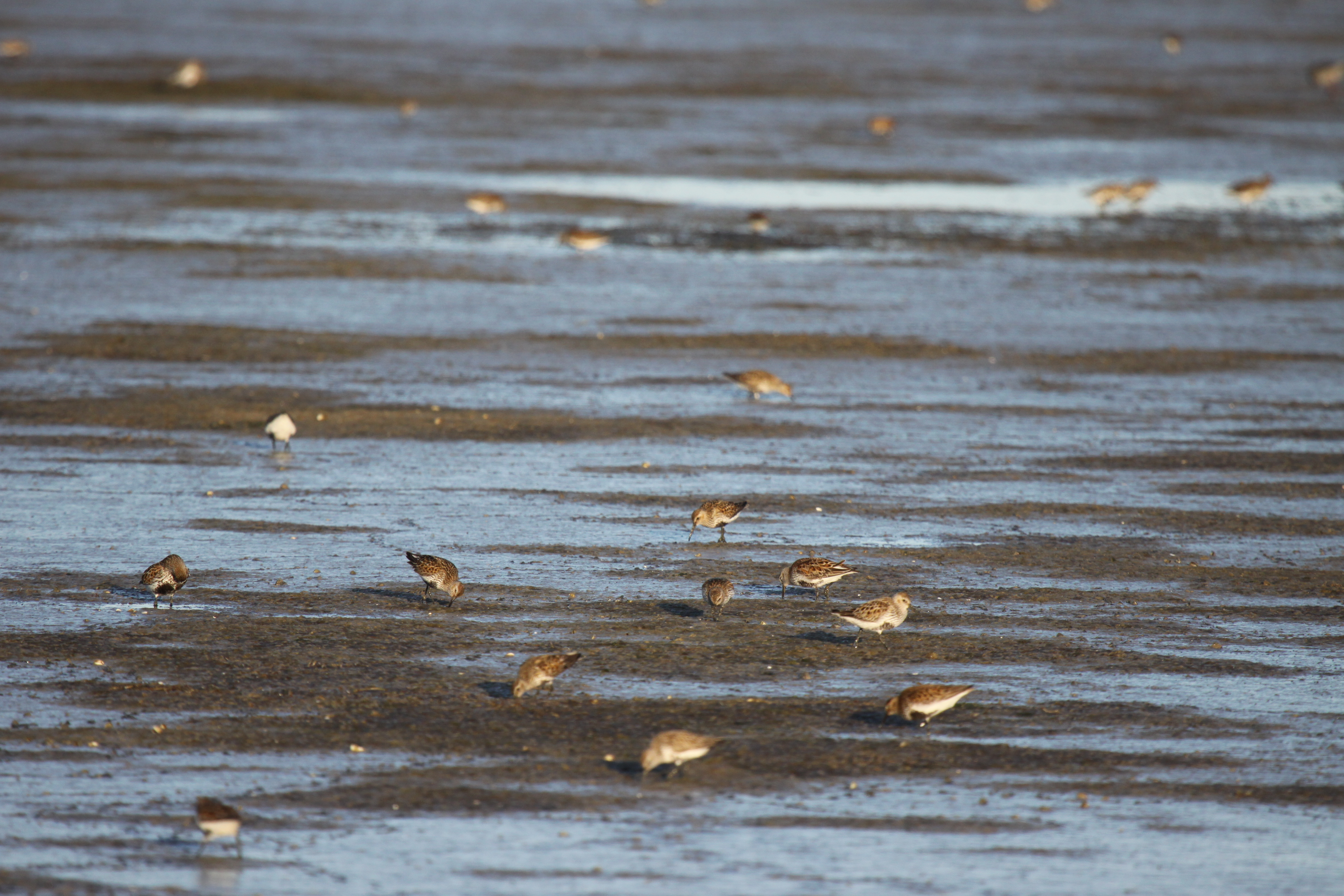
Sandpipers

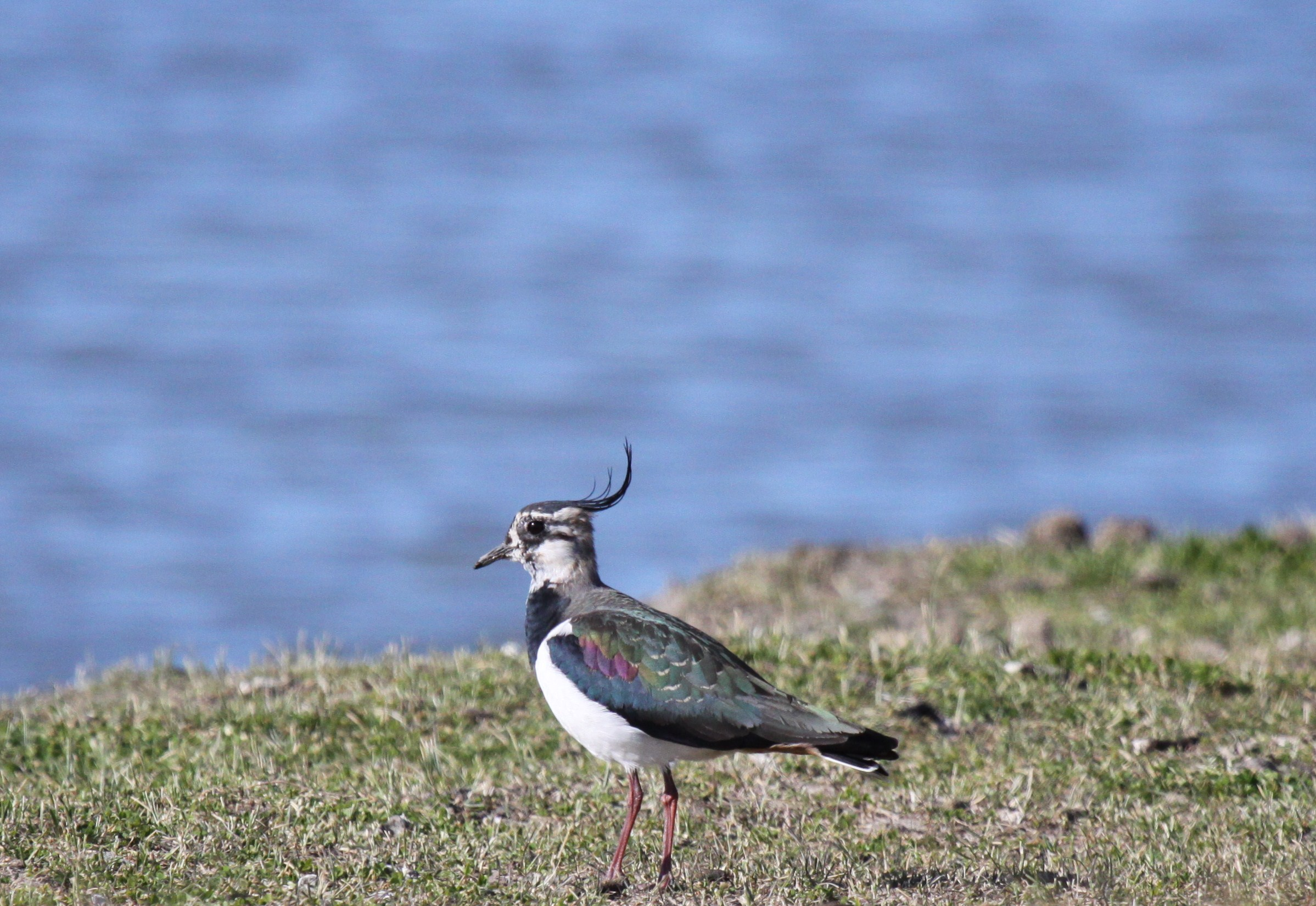
Crested Peewit

Fishing and Boats

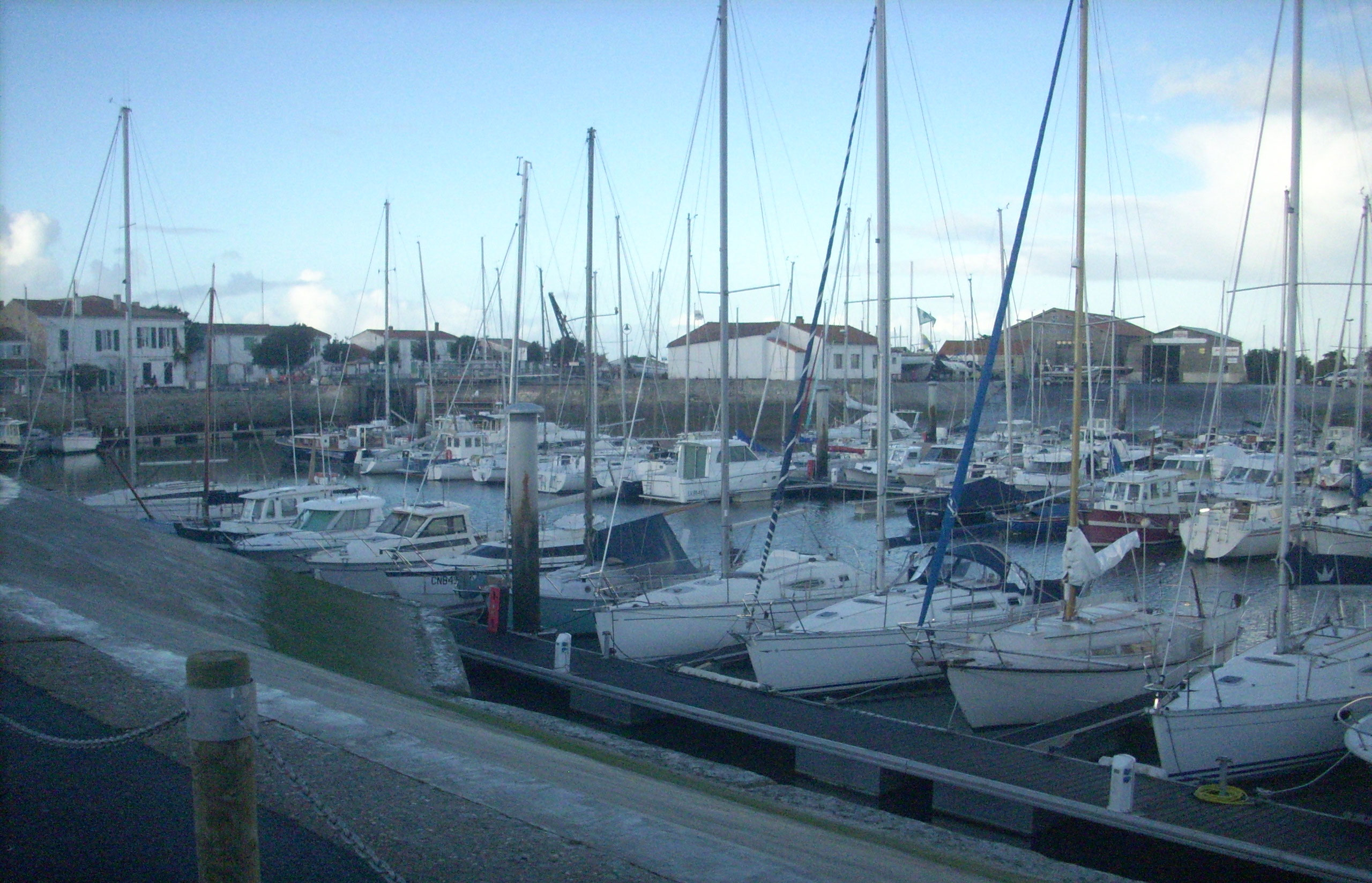
The harbour

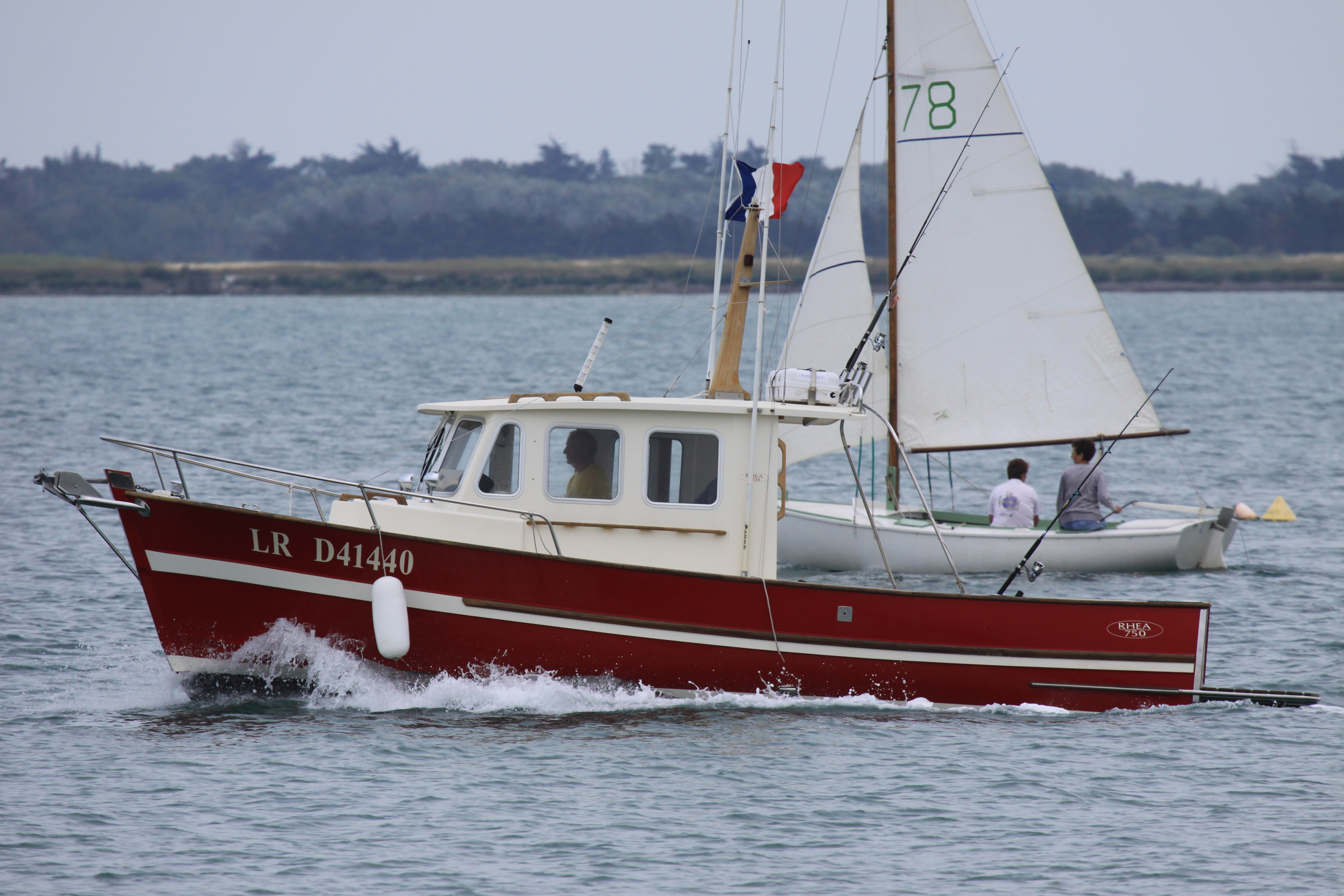
A pleasure fishing boat

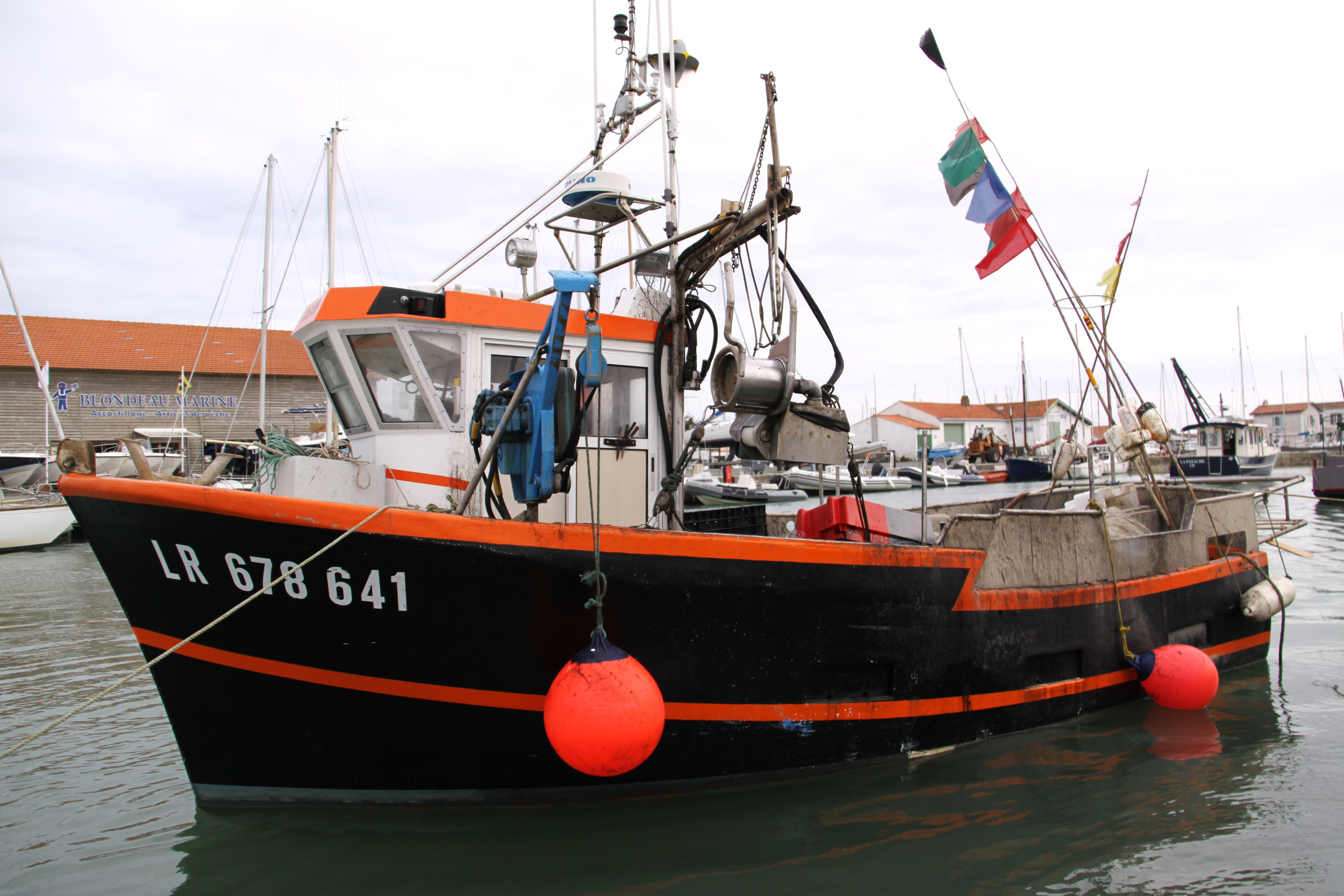
Fishing boat

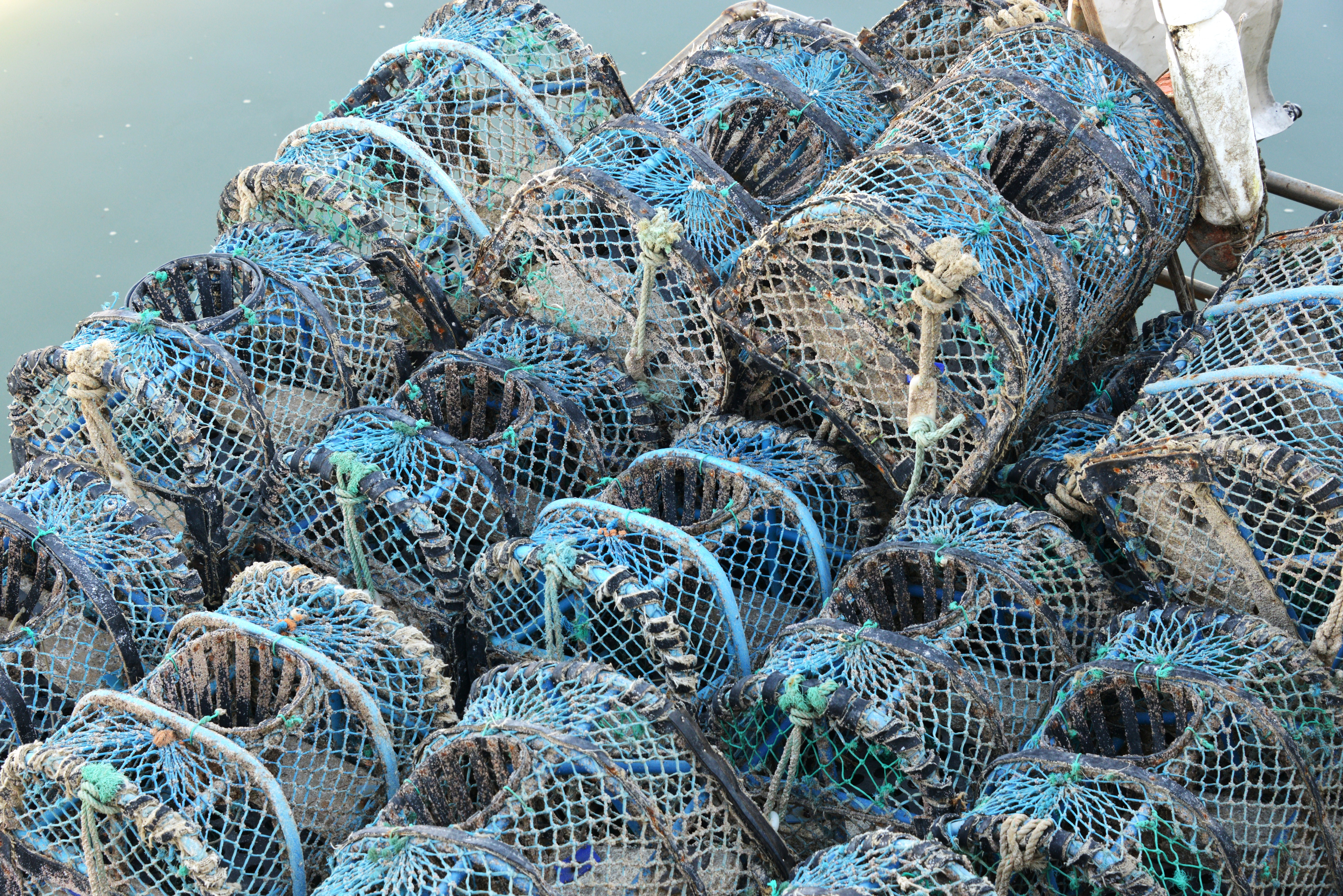
Lobster pots

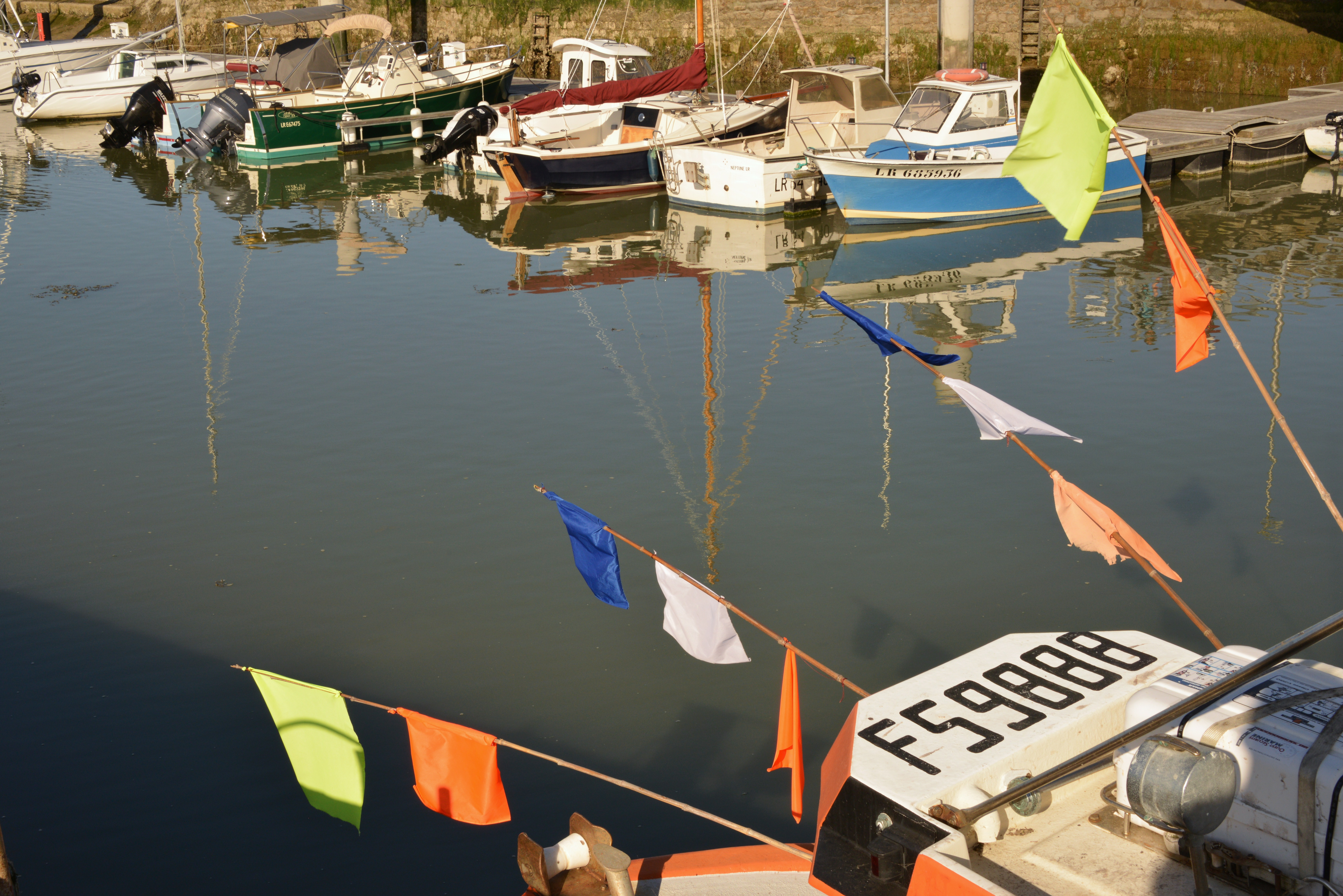
Penants for fishing buoys

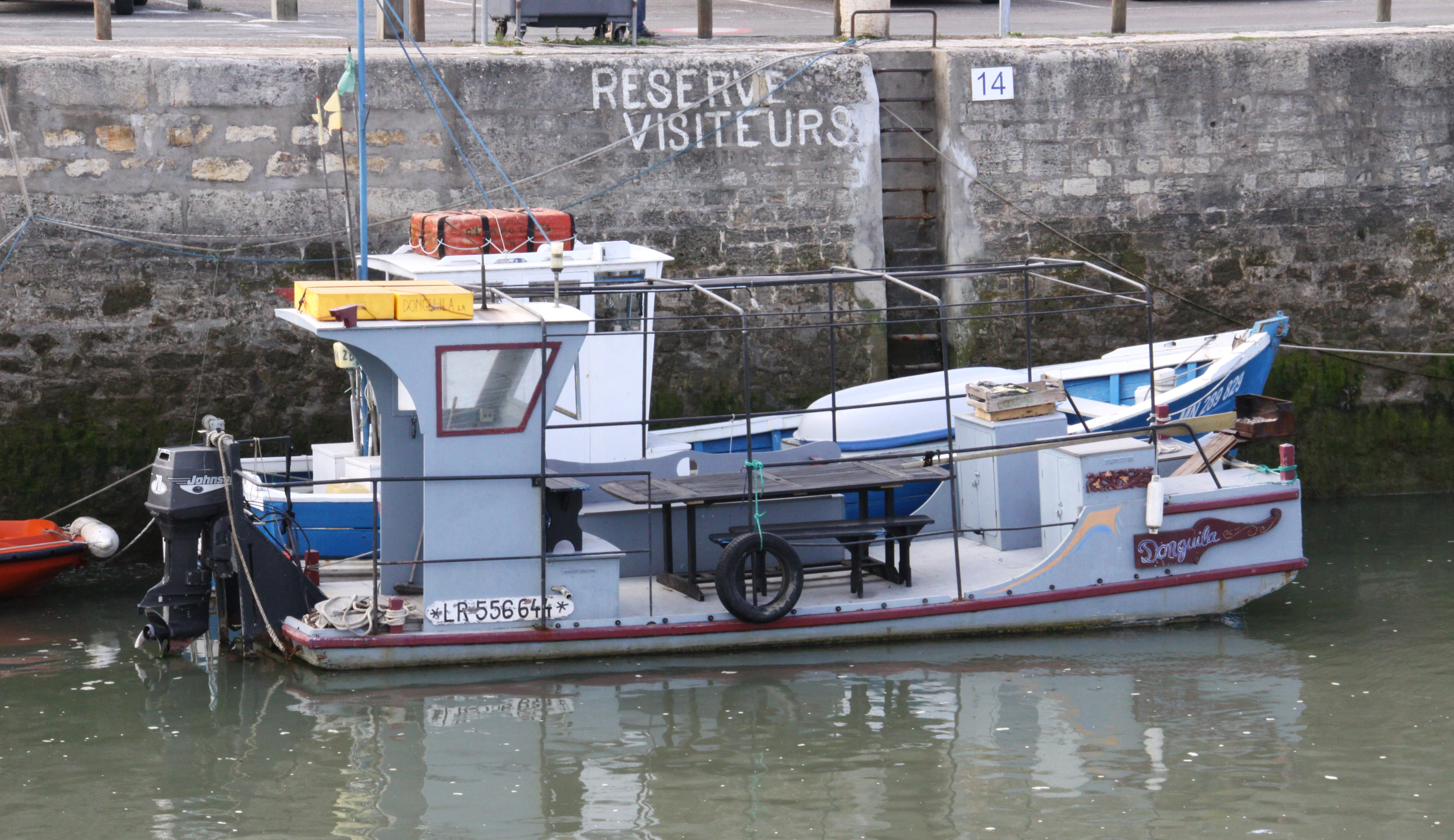
A leisure barge

== Notable people linked to the commune ==
- Mathurin Renaud (14 October 1641 – 1676), born in Ars-en-Ré (parish of Saint-Étienne), an important historical figure: a pioneer of New France and one of the first inhabitants of Charlesbourg.
- William Barbotin (1861-1931), painter and engraver.
- Marie-Thérèse Dethan-Roullet (1870-1945), painter, was born here.
- Lionel Jospin, former Prime Minister of France, had a house here where he stayed regularly.
- Claude Barma, former Italian Film director, father of Catherine Barma, was buried here.
- In the Narthex of the church there is a representation of John Vianney (1786-1859), the famous "Curé of Ars" although he was a priest in the commune of Ars-sur-Formans in Ain.
- Philippe Sollers (1936-2023), writer, had a house here. He is buried in the Ars-en-Ré cemetery.

== See also ==
- Communes of the Charente-Maritime department
