= Le Bois-Plage-en-Ré =

- Commune
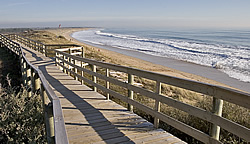
- The beach in Le Bois-Plage-en-Ré

- Coat of arms
- Location of Le Bois-Plage-en-Ré
- Location within France Location within Nouvelle-Aquitaine
- Coordinates: 46°11′14″N 1°23′31″W
- Country: France
- Region: Nouvelle-Aquitaine
- Department: Charente-Maritime
- Arrondissement: La Rochelle
- Canton: Île de Ré
- Intercommunality: Île de Ré

Government
  - Mayor (2020–2026): Gérard Juin
- Area^{1}: 12.18 km^{2} (4.70 sq mi)
- Elevation: 11 m (36 ft)
- Highest elevation: 17 m (56 ft)
- Lowest elevation: 1 m (3.3 ft)
- Population (2023): 2,125
  - Density: 174.5/km^{2} (451.9/sq mi)
- Time zone: UTC+01:00 (CET)
  - Summer (DST): UTC+02:00 (CEST)
- INSEE/Postal code: 17051 /17580
- ^{1} French Land Register data, which excludes lakes, ponds, glaciers > 1 km^{2} (0.386 sq mi or 247 acres) and river estuaries.

Le Bois-Plage-en-Ré (French pronunciation: [lə bwa plaʒ ɑ̃ ʁe]) is a commune in the Charente-Maritime department in the Nouvelle-Aquitaine region in southwestern France. It is situated on the Île de Ré.

== Population ==
Historical population

Year	Pop.	±% p.a.
1793	2,300	—
1800	1,950	−2.33%
1806	1,922	−0.24%
1821	2,154	+0.76%
1831	2,088	−0.31%
1836	2,059	−0.28%
1841	2,048	−0.11%
1846	2,093	+0.44%
1851	2,074	−0.18%
1856	1,987	−0.85%
1861	1,940	−0.48%
1866	1,895	−0.47%
1872	1,738	−1.43%
1876	1,633	−1.55%
1881	1,714	+0.97%
1886	1,647	−0.79%
1891	1,679	+0.39%
1896	1,618	−0.74%
1901	1,598	−0.25%

Year	Pop.	±% p.a.
1906	1,504	−1.21%
1911	1,273	−3.28%
1921	1,100	−1.45%
1926	1,085	−0.27%
1931	1,056	−0.54%
1936	1,005	−0.99%
1946	893	−1.17%
1954	1,084	+2.45%
1962	1,172	+0.98%
1968	1,172	+0.00%
1975	1,317	+1.68%
1982	1,560	+2.45%
1990	2,014	+3.24%
1999	2,235	+1.16%
2007	2,303	+0.38%
2012	2,353	+0.43%
2017	2,248	−0.91%
2023	2,125	−0.93%

Source: EHESS and INSEE (1968-2023)

== See also ==
- Communes of the Charente-Maritime department
