= Canton of Île de Ré =

Canton of France

Coordinates: 46.20°N 1.36°W

The Canton of Île de Ré (French: canton de l'Île de Ré) is a canton on the Ré Island in the French department of Charente-Maritime, Nouvelle-Aquitaine, western France. It was created at the French canton reorganisation which came into effect in March 2015. Its seat is in Saint-Martin-de-Ré.

It consists of the following communes:

1. Ars-en-Ré
2. Le Bois-Plage-en-Ré
3. La Couarde-sur-Mer
4. La Flotte
5. Loix
6. Les Portes-en-Ré
7. Rivedoux-Plage
8. Saint-Clément-des-Baleines
9. Sainte-Marie-de-Ré
10. Saint-Martin-de-Ré
