= La Couarde-sur-Mer =

- Commune
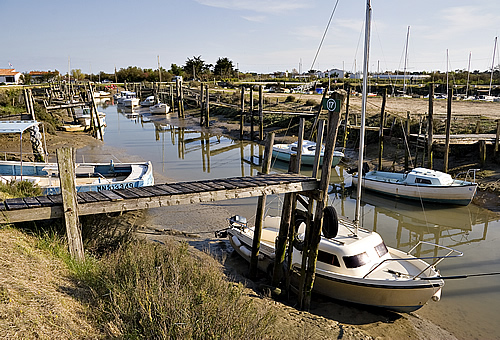
- The moorings in La Couarde-sur-Mer

- Coat of arms
- Location of La Couarde-sur-Mer
- Location within France Location within Nouvelle-Aquitaine
- Coordinates: 46°11′44″N 1°25′27″W
- Country: France
- Region: Nouvelle-Aquitaine
- Department: Charente-Maritime
- Arrondissement: La Rochelle
- Canton: Île de Ré
- Intercommunality: Île de Ré

Government
  - Mayor (2020–2026): Patrick Rayton
- Area^{1}: 8.80 km^{2} (3.40 sq mi)
- Elevation: 5 m (16 ft)
- Highest elevation: 17 m (56 ft)
- Lowest elevation: 0 m (0 ft)
- Population (2023): 1,112
  - Density: 126/km^{2} (327/sq mi)
- Time zone: UTC+01:00 (CET)
  - Summer (DST): UTC+02:00 (CEST)
- INSEE/Postal code: 17121 /17670
- ^{1} French Land Register data, which excludes lakes, ponds, glaciers > 1 km^{2} (0.386 sq mi or 247 acres) and river estuaries.

La Couarde-sur-Mer (French pronunciation: [la kwaʁd syʁ mɛʁ], literally La Couarde on Sea) is a commune in the Charente-Maritime department, Nouvelle-Aquitaine, southwestern France. It is situated on the Île de Ré.

== Population ==
Historical population
| Year | Pop. | ±% p.a. |
|---|---|---|
| 1968 | 758 | — |
| 1975 | 794 | +0.67% |
| 1982 | 856 | +1.08% |
| 1990 | 1,029 | +2.33% |
| 1999 | 1,179 | +1.52% |
| 2007 | 1,241 | +0.64% |
| 2012 | 1,242 | +0.02% |
| 2017 | 1,206 | −0.59% |
| 2023 | 1,112 | −1.34% |
Source: INSEE

== See also ==
- Communes of the Charente-Maritime department
