= Sainte-Marie-de-Ré =

- Commune
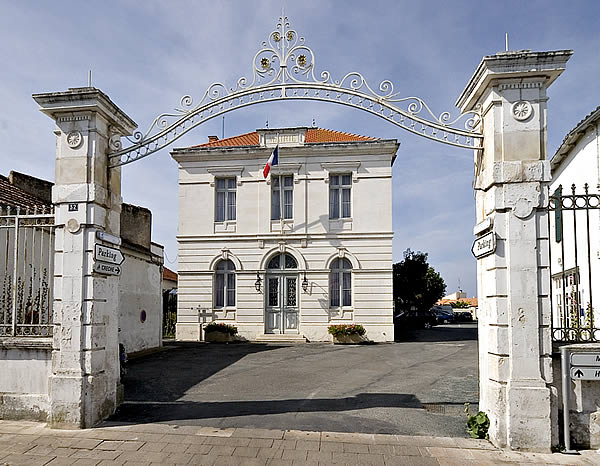
- The town hall in Sainte-Marie-de-Ré
- Location of Sainte-Marie-de-Ré
- Location within France Location within Nouvelle-Aquitaine
- Coordinates: 46°09′02″N 1°18′35″W
- Country: France
- Region: Nouvelle-Aquitaine
- Department: Charente-Maritime
- Arrondissement: La Rochelle
- Canton: Île de Ré
- Intercommunality: Île de Ré

Government
  - Mayor (2020–2026): Gisèle Vergnon
- Area^{1}: 9.84 km^{2} (3.80 sq mi)
- Elevation: 8 m (26 ft)
- Highest elevation: 17 m (56 ft)
- Lowest elevation: 0 m (0 ft)
- Population (2023): 3,412
  - Density: 347/km^{2} (898/sq mi)
- Time zone: UTC+01:00 (CET)
  - Summer (DST): UTC+02:00 (CEST)
- INSEE/Postal code: 17360 /17740
- ^{1} French Land Register data, which excludes lakes, ponds, glaciers > 1 km^{2} (0.386 sq mi or 247 acres) and river estuaries.

Sainte-Marie-de-Ré (French pronunciation: [sɛ̃t maʁi də ʁe]; Poitevin-Saintongese: Sénte-Marie-de-Rét) is a commune located on the Isle of Ré, in the French department of Charente-Maritime, and the region of New Aquitaine, southwestern Metropolitan France.

== Geography ==
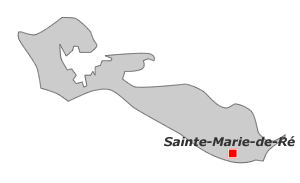
Location of Sainte-Marie on l'Île de Ré

Sainte-Marie-de-Ré is a small village, on the southern coast of the Île de Ré, facing the Île d'Oléron.

The coastal part is bordered by beaches and small cliffs.

== History ==
Sainte-Marie (as a word) was first used as a designation for a Parish Church in the late 12th century. The village centered on grape farming for over a millennium and maintains a strong rural identity. The commune was officially begun in 1790.

== Population ==
- Inhabitants of Sainte-Marie-de-Ré: Maritais.
- Inhabitants of La Noue: Nouais.

Historical population
Year	Pop.	±% p.a.
1968	1,195	—
1975	1,165	−0.36%
1982	1,317	+1.77%
1990	1,806	+4.03%
1999	2,655	+4.37%
2007	3,082	+1.88%
2012	3,283	+1.27%
2017	3,366	+0.50%
2023	3,412	+0.23%
Source: INSEE

== Economy ==
- Agriculture: grape vineyards, asparagus, potatoes.
- Tourism.
- Thalassotherapy: The thalassotherapy center on the waterfront of the south-eastern edge of Sainte-Marie was expanded in 2004.
- Computer information technology.

== Sights ==
=== Religious sites ===
- The Parish church, Notre-Dame-de-l'Assomption at Sainte-Marie de Ré whose existence was first recorded in the late 12th century. In 1467 the church was fortified and a moat surrounding the church was dug.
- The Saint Sauveur Chapel at La Noue.

=== Civil sites ===
- A Monument to the Dead.
- A monument by sculptor Mélanie Quentin called "La Connaissance" which was installed in 2006.
- The Magayant house, a fishing museum.

== International relations ==
The commune is twinned with:

- (France) Pierrefort

== See also ==
- Communes of the Charente-Maritime department
