= Claude Buckle =

Mid-20th century English painter

Claude Henry Buckle R.I., Royal Society for Marine Artists (R.S.M.A.) (10 October 1905 – 9 August 1973) was an English painter well known for railway posters, carriage prints and for oil and watercolour paintings.

== Early life ==
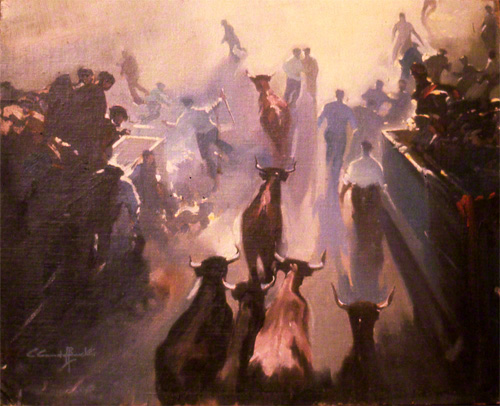
Oil painting by Claude Buckle showing the event in Pamplona 'running of the bulls'. The picture shows the entrance of the bull ring at the end of run with bulls and people mingled together.

Claude Buckle was interested in art from an early age. He attended Grammar school in Wolverhampton and on leaving in 1922 joined J. S. Fry & Sons Chocolates in Bristol as an assistant architect. During his time with Fry’s he was involved in the building of the new factory at Keynsham Somerdale and was supported by Fry’s to study Architecture at Bristol University. He lived at Keynsham and Kent Road Bishopston in Bristol.

== Early career ==
In 1926, at the age of 21, Buckle moved to London where he joined Wallis, Gilbert and Partners responsible for building the Ford factories at Dagenham.

Buckle painted in his spare time. In 1930, after submitting four drawings, became one of the youngest amateur members of the British Savages Art Group based in Bristol. He contributed to the yearly exhibition until 1934. He travelled in France, Spain and North Africa using Tramp Steamers recording scenes that later formed many of the ideas for his watercolour paintings.

At the age of 26 he left full-time employment to concentrate his efforts as a professional freelance commercial artist. He undertook commissions including hotel brochures and book illustrations.

== Railway posters ==
In 1932 he obtained his first railway poster commission at the Southern Railway HQ at Waterloo station from a Mr. Beaumont and later other commissions through the publicity offices of the Southern Region under the P.R.O Don Falkner.

This was Buckle's big break and during the pre-war years and after the war until 1963 Buckle produced some estimated 85 posters and 25 carriage prints for the railways making him one of the most prolific and recognized railway poster artists. He was a close friend of Terence Cuneo whom he met frequently on travels around England recording scenes for the railway posters that were a common site on railway station platforms and booking halls. Both artists have surviving artwork in the National Railway Museum. However, when the work started to dry up in 1963, following the Beeching Axe, Buckle relied more and more on the private market place to earn a living. On the advice of Cuneo, he moved away almost entirely from oil painting to concentrate his efforts on watercolours.

== Architect ==
During the war years, he worked as an architect with the bomb disposal and rescue unit based at Old Kent Road. Like many others, he witnessed terrible scenes of death and destruction in bombed London. Buckle spent the last years of the war in Northern Ireland producing architectural plan and supervising the construction of aerodromes for American bombers.

== Post-WWII ==
In 1946 he married Barbara and found appreciative support and happiness. Two years later, he moved from the outskirts of London to a small hamlet, Vernham Dean in North Hampshire, where his twin children Terence and Barbara were born. He resumed both commercial painting and engineering architectural perspectives as well as fine art oil and watercolour paintings.

== Nuclear power plant paintings ==
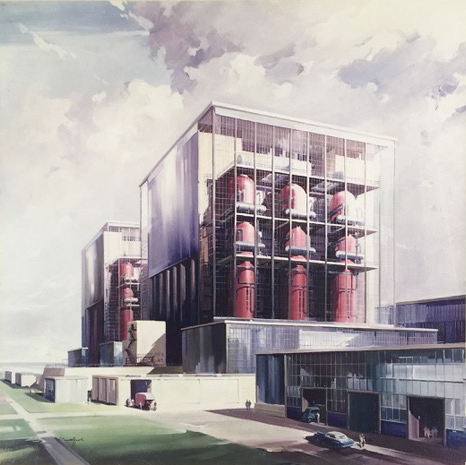
Hinkley Point A Nuclear power station finished plant. The artists impression 1957. A watercolour.

During the late 1950s, the main construction contractors to the Atomic Energy Authority commissioned Buckle to paint a series of Oils and watercolours depicting the construction phase and the finished plants of the first emerging atomic power stations. In 1958, the British engineering stand at the Brussels World Fair exhibited his painting in oils depicting the construction of the first commercial atomic power station at Hinkley Point showing Goliath, the largest crane in the world at that time, used to construct the station. The picture measuring 18 feet by 24 feet, took four months to paint.

== Watercolours ==
From 1958 onwards, Buckle concentrated on watercolour particularly water scenes. The Royal Institute of Painters in Water Colours, the Federation of British Artists, the Marine Society and the London Boat Show exhibited the pictures in their galleries from 1958 onwards. In 1962, Buckle accepted an invitation to become a member of the Royal Institute of Painters in Water Colours (RI) and in 1964 accepted membership of the Royal Society for Marine Artists (RSMA). Buckle also sold many paintings through private galleries and was in demand by private collectors and admirers. He also allowed printing companies to reproduce certain pictures—notably Medici and Royle’s. The full-scale lithographic reproductions were distributed to High Street retailers for example Fenwick. He also held sales of his work in Marlborough, Wiltshire, and London and in his studio at Vernham Dean. He produced an estimated 300 watercolour paintings.

== Travel in France and Spain ==
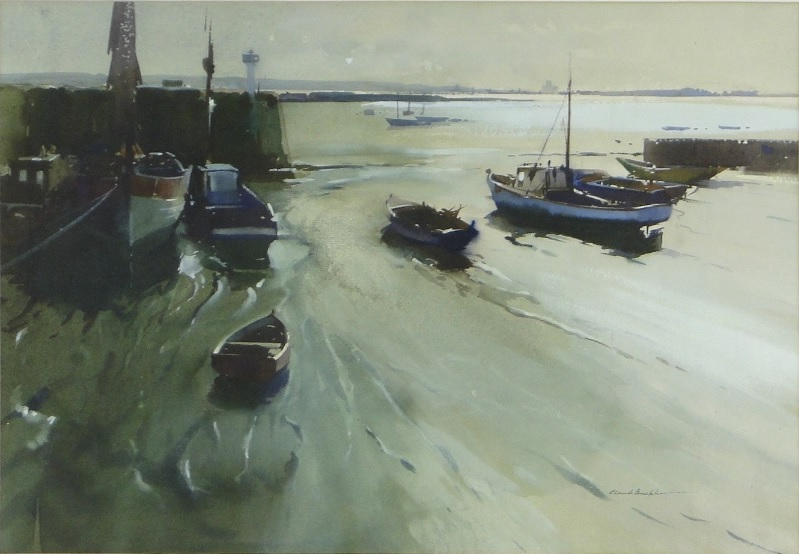
Port of Rivedoux-Plage a water colour painting

Buckle particularly enjoyed holidays in France and Spain, enjoying the relaxed atmosphere of recording French and Spanish scenes that he later completed in the Studio at Vernham Dean. He visited France and Spain nearly every year from 1952 until 1973. He spent much time during the later years of his life on the Île de Ré at Rivedoux. The pictures depicting the scenes of this area were some of his favourite watercolours.

== Appreciation ==
In his appreciation to Claude Buckle, Terence Cuneo paid tribute to Buckle's style of painting. He pointed out that the living world gives enough inspiration on its own to produce a very high quality picture suitable for the living room. Buckle has achieved a position in the forefront of contemporary British water colour painting and continues to give to this day great delight and pleasure to the many owners of the paintings.

== Public collections ==
- National Railway Museum (21 works)
- Kirkcaldy Museum and Art Gallery (1 work)
- City Art Centre (1 work)
- North Down Council (1 work)
- Birmingham Museums Trust (5 works)
- Museums for Nuclear Power Generation

== Private collections ==
- Travelling Art gallery [18 works]
- Mark Brown [28 works][unfortunately the owner of this site is now deceased] see wayback machine somersetfineart.co.uk 2012

== Books documentaries and magazines ==
- Travelling Art Galleries documentary by Greg Norden 2021
- Poster to Poster vol 1-8, Richard Furness, 2014
- Landscapes under the luggage rack by Greg Norden, 1997
- Railway Posters 1923-1947, Beverley Cole & Richard Durack, 1992
- Happy Holidays, Michael Palin, 1987
- The Artist (UK magazine), "start right with water colour", February 1963
