= Fosbury (disambiguation) =

Fosbury may refer to:

- Fosbury, a village in Wiltshire, England
- Fosbury Camp, the site of an Iron Age hillfort in Wiltshire, England
- Dick Fosbury (1947–2023), American athlete
  - Fosbury Flop, a style of high jump named after Dick Fosbury
- Robert Fosbury, British astronomer
