= Chute, Wiltshire =

Village and parish in Hampshire, England

Coordinates: 51.283°N 1.574°W

Chute
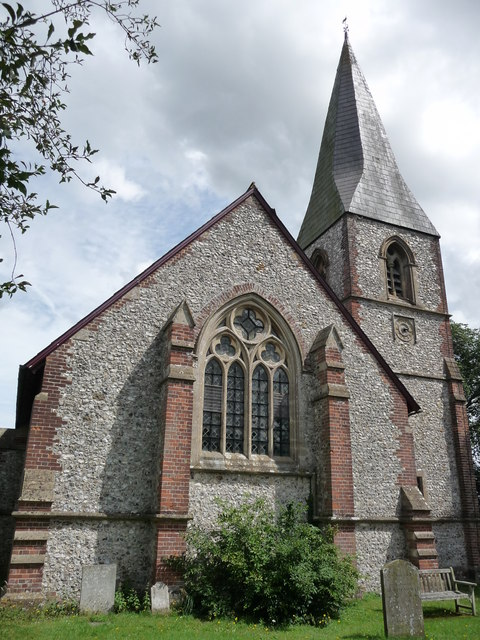
- Church of St Nicholas

- Location within Wiltshire
- Population: 299 (in 2011)
- OS grid reference: SU298538
- Civil parish: Chute
- Unitary authority: Wiltshire
- Ceremonial county: Wiltshire
- Region: South West
- Country: England
- Sovereign state: United Kingdom
- Post town: Andover
- Postcode district: SP11
- Dialling code: 01264
- Police: Wiltshire
- Fire: Dorset and Wiltshire
- Ambulance: South Western
- UK Parliament: East Wiltshire
- Website: Parish Council

Chute is a civil parish in east Wiltshire, England, on the border with Hampshire. It includes the main village of Upper Chute and the smaller settlements of Lower Chute, Chute Standen, Chute Cadley and Mount Cowdown. The settlements are sometimes known collectively as "The Chutes". The nearest town is Andover, Hampshire, about 6 miles (10 km) to the southeast.

Conholt House and Conholt Park are in the northeast of the parish.

== Etymology ==
Chute takes its name from Chute Forest. This name is first attested in the Domesday Book of 1086, in the Latin phrase "silva que vocatur Cetum" ("the wood that is called Cetum"); the name is first attested as the name of a settlement in 1235, as Cett’. The name derives from the Common Brittonic word that survives today in modern Welsh as coed ("woodland"). Spellings with an e, along the lines of Cet, Cette, Chet and Chette dominate the record through the thirteenth century and reflect the usual borrowing of this Brittonic word into Old English. The spelling Chute, first attested for the village in 1268 (as Chuth’) and for the forest in 1283 (as Chute), reflects dialectal variation in Old English, specifically the West-Saxon sound-change known as palatal diphthongisation.

== History ==
=== Early history ===
Evidence of Neolithic occupation includes an oval barrow at Scotspoor, in the northeast corner of the parish. The northern boundary of the parish follows a prehistoric ditch and there is a prehistoric field system on Chute Down in the southwest. Bevisbury, a small Iron Age fort, is just over the Hampshire border near Chute Cadley.

The Domesday book of 1086 recorded farmland and a mill at Standen. In the 13th century the whole area was part of Chute Forest.

=== 1964 Vulcan crash ===
An Avro Vulcan bomber XH535 crashed on high ground in the parish on 11 May 1964 during a demonstration flight from Boscombe Down. The commander and co-pilot ejected but four others on board were killed.

== Local government ==
Chute is a civil parish with an elected parish council. It is in the area of Wiltshire Council unitary authority. Both councils are responsible for different aspects of local government.

The nearby village of Chute Forest has its own parish council.

== Upper Chute ==
The Church of England parish church of Saint Nicholas is mentioned in 1320 and in Dean Chandler's register of 1405. It was almost completely rebuilt in the period 1869–72 to designs by J.L. Pearson. The old church consisted of a chancel and nave with south transept, south porch, and west timber bell turret. The walls were faced with knapped flint and supported by prominent red-brick buttresses, and the 15th-century windows were replaced by new ones in 13th-century style. A vestry was built on the north side of the chancel, and the porch and the bell turret were replaced by a new south porch below a tower and a slated spire.

The church is now part of the Savernake Team ministry and also serves Chute Forest parish, following the closure of the Victorian St Mary's Church in 1970. Six bells were transferred from the redundant church to St Nicholas' in 1976.

The Cross Keys Inn was built at the turn of the 19th century, and remained open as a public house until 2004, when its owners sought planning permission to turn it into residential property. A 'Save Our Pub' campaign was mounted by locals with the support of the Campaign for Real Ale, and in March 2006 the inn reopened under new ownership.

== Chute Standen ==
A school was built on the road to Upper Chute in 1858, and was attended by pupils from the parishes of Chute and Chute Forest. The architect was William White and construction was in flint with red brick dressings. The school was closed in 1978 and the building became the village hall.

== Chute Causeway ==
The Chute Causeway is a section of the Roman Road that runs from Winchester northwest to Mildenhall (near Marlborough) and onwards to Cirencester. At Conholt the road deviates west to avoid the deep Hippenscombe valley, resuming its straight course near Tidcombe. The length of the deviation is about 4 miles (6 km) and the Causeway forms the southern 2 1/2 miles (4 km).

=== Local folklore and legend ===
During the reign of Charles II the bubonic plague struck the parishes of Chute and Vernham Dean. At Vernham Dean a rector persuaded his parishioners to isolate themselves at the top of the hill along which Chute Causeway runs. When the time came for him to supply the food and care he had promised, the fear he had of the disease meant he failed to uphold his honour and left the villagers to die. Another story has him falling ill himself before he could do the job. He himself did not survive, even after the betrayal of his parishioners, as the plague also killed him. Since then his ghost has been seen to wander up the hill towards the campsite on the Causeway, never completing the journey he did not have the courage to finish. As he has not been seen for a long time, he may have found peace at last.
