= Hippenscombe =

Hamlet in Wiltshire, England

Coordinates: 51.303°N 1.556°W

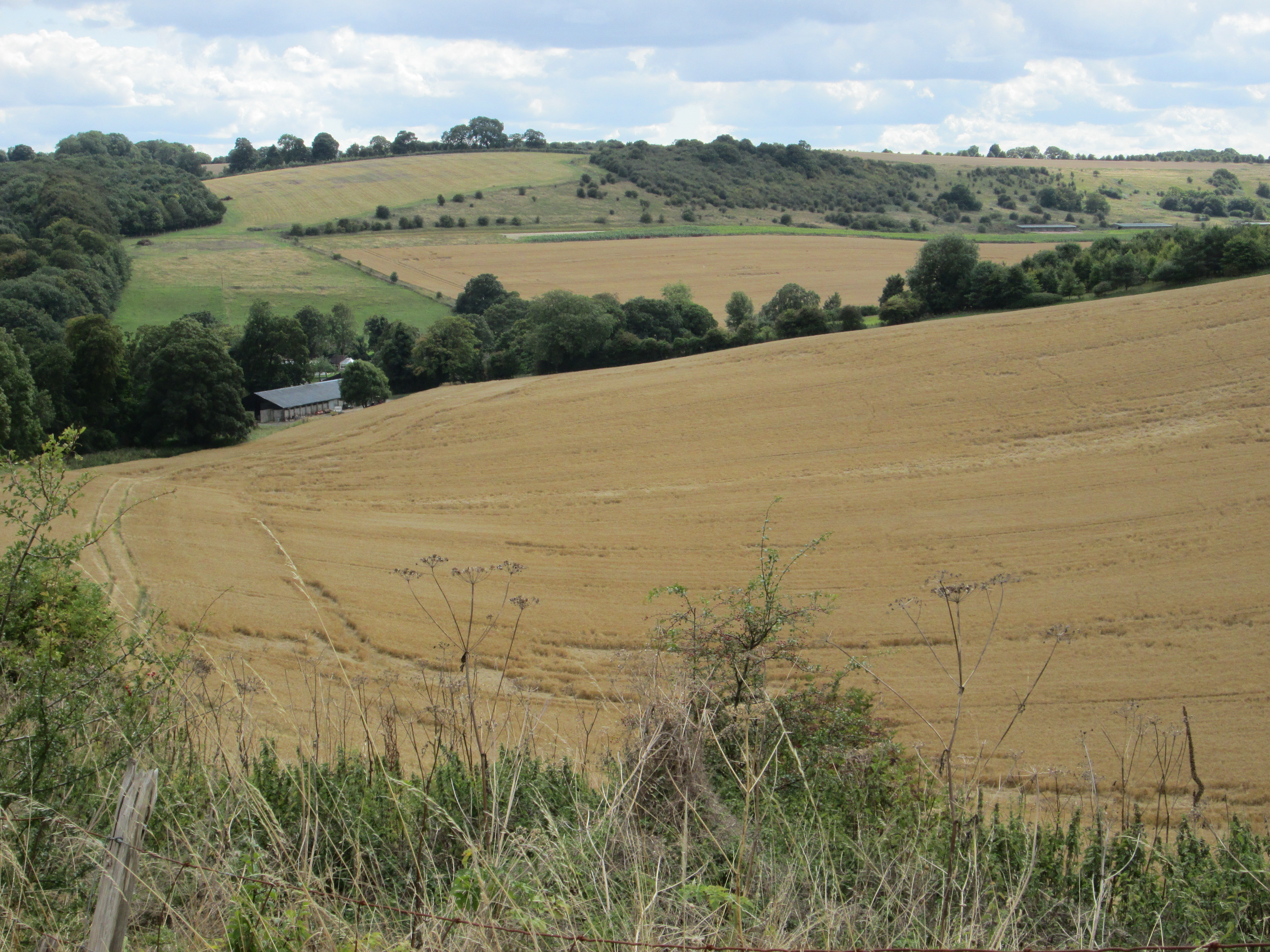

- Location within Wiltshire
- OS grid reference: SU310561
- Civil parish: Tidcombe and Fosbury
- Unitary authority: Wiltshire
- Ceremonial county: Wiltshire
- Region: South West
- Country: England
- Sovereign state: United Kingdom
- Post town: Marlborough
- Postcode district: SN8
- Dialling code: 01264
- Police: Wiltshire
- Fire: Dorset and Wiltshire
- Ambulance: South Western
- UK Parliament: East Wiltshire

Hippenscombe is a hamlet within the civil parish of Tidcombe and Fosbury, Wiltshire, in the southwest of England. Marked only on large-scale maps, it lies to the southwest of Oakhill Wood and the northwest of Conholt Park, about 8 miles (13 km) south of Hungerford, Berkshire.

Hippenscombe has a long separate history of its own, having been an extra-parochial area. Much of the land was assigned in 1553 to Edward Seymour (1539–1621), later Earl of Hertford and the builder of Tottenham House in Savernake Forest, and was owned by his descendants until sold by Charles Brudenell-Bruce, 1st Marquess of Ailesbury in 1827.

The area was severely affected by the Swing Riots of 1830. The population taken at 19th-century censuses was never more than 59, and by 1891 had declined to 35.

John Marius Wilson's Imperial Gazetteer of England and Wales (1870–1872) said of Hippenscombe:

HIPPENSCOMBE, an extra-parochial tract in the district of Hungerford and county of Wilts; adjacent to Hants and Berks, 4¼ miles NE of Ludgershall. Acres, 980. Real property, £545. Pop., 42. Houses, 11.

In 1858 Hippenscombe became a separate civil parish. Hippenscombe was added to Tidcombe ecclesiastical parish in 1879 and to Tidcombe and Fosbury civil parish in 1894.
