= Chute Forest =

Village and civil parish in Wiltshire, England

Coordinates: 51.264°N 1.558°W

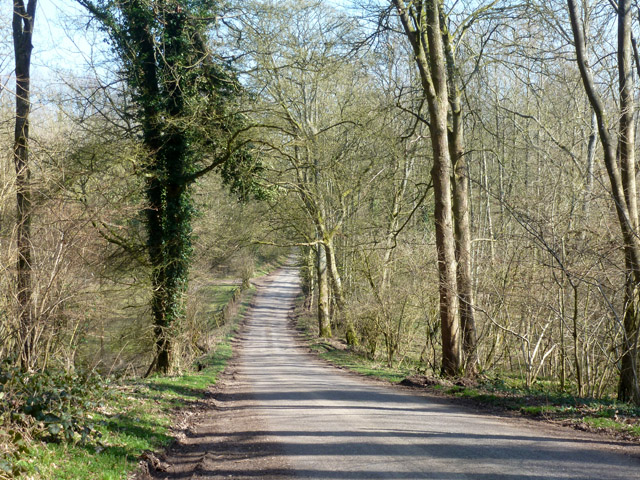
- Lodge Lane, Chute Forest

- Location within Wiltshire
- Population: 180 (in 2011)
- OS grid reference: SU309517
- Civil parish: Chute Forest
- Unitary authority: Wiltshire
- Ceremonial county: Wiltshire
- Region: South West
- Country: England
- Sovereign state: United Kingdom
- Post town: Andover
- Postcode district: SP11
- Dialling code: 01264
- Police: Wiltshire
- Fire: Dorset and Wiltshire
- Ambulance: South Western
- UK Parliament: East Wiltshire
- Website: Parish Council

Chute Forest is a village and civil parish in east Wiltshire, England. The parish is bordered to the east and south by the county of Hampshire. The village is about 5 miles (8 km) northwest of Andover and 3 miles (5 km) to the east of Ludgershall.

== Etymology ==
The name Chute Forest is first attested in the Domesday Book of 1086, in the Latin phrase "silva que vocatur Cetum" ("the wood that is called Cetum"). The name derives from the Common Brittonic word that survives today in modern Welsh as coed ("woodland"). Spellings with an e, along the lines of Cet, Cette, Chet and Chette dominate the record through the thirteenth century and reflect the usual borrowing of this Brittonic word into Old English. The spelling Chute, first attested for the village that takes its name from the forest in 1268 (as Chuth’) and for the forest itself in 1283 (as Chute), reflects dialectal variation in Old English, specifically the West-Saxon sound-change known as palatal diphthongisation.

== History ==
The area was a large royal forest by the 13th century and continued in Crown ownership until 1639. It was then an extra-parochial area until it became a civil parish in the 19th century, and an ecclesiastical parish in 1875 after the church was built.

== The Chute Hoard ==
A hoard of Iron Age coins found in the northeast in 1927 (with further coins found in 1986 and 1994) is the only evidence of prehistoric activity in the parish. The coins are from the 1st century BC. The British Museum holds 36 coins while the Wiltshire Museum at Devizes has others, together with the hollow flint nodule in which they were found.

== Chute Lodge ==
Chute Lodge, in the centre of the parish, is a country house built in red brick in 1768 by Sir Robert Taylor, on or near the site of an earlier house. In 1988 the house was designated as Grade I listed.

== Parish church ==
St Mary's Church, 600 metres north of Chute Lodge, was built between 1870 and 1871 to designs by J.L. Pearson and consecrated in 1875. It has been designated as a Grade II* listed building and is now in the care of the Churches Conservation Trust.

== Local government ==
Chute Forest is a civil parish with an elected parish council. It is in the area of Wiltshire Council unitary authority, which is responsible for almost all significant local government functions.
