= Sablanceau and Redoute of Rivedoux =

Coordinates: 46°9′38″N 1°15′34″W

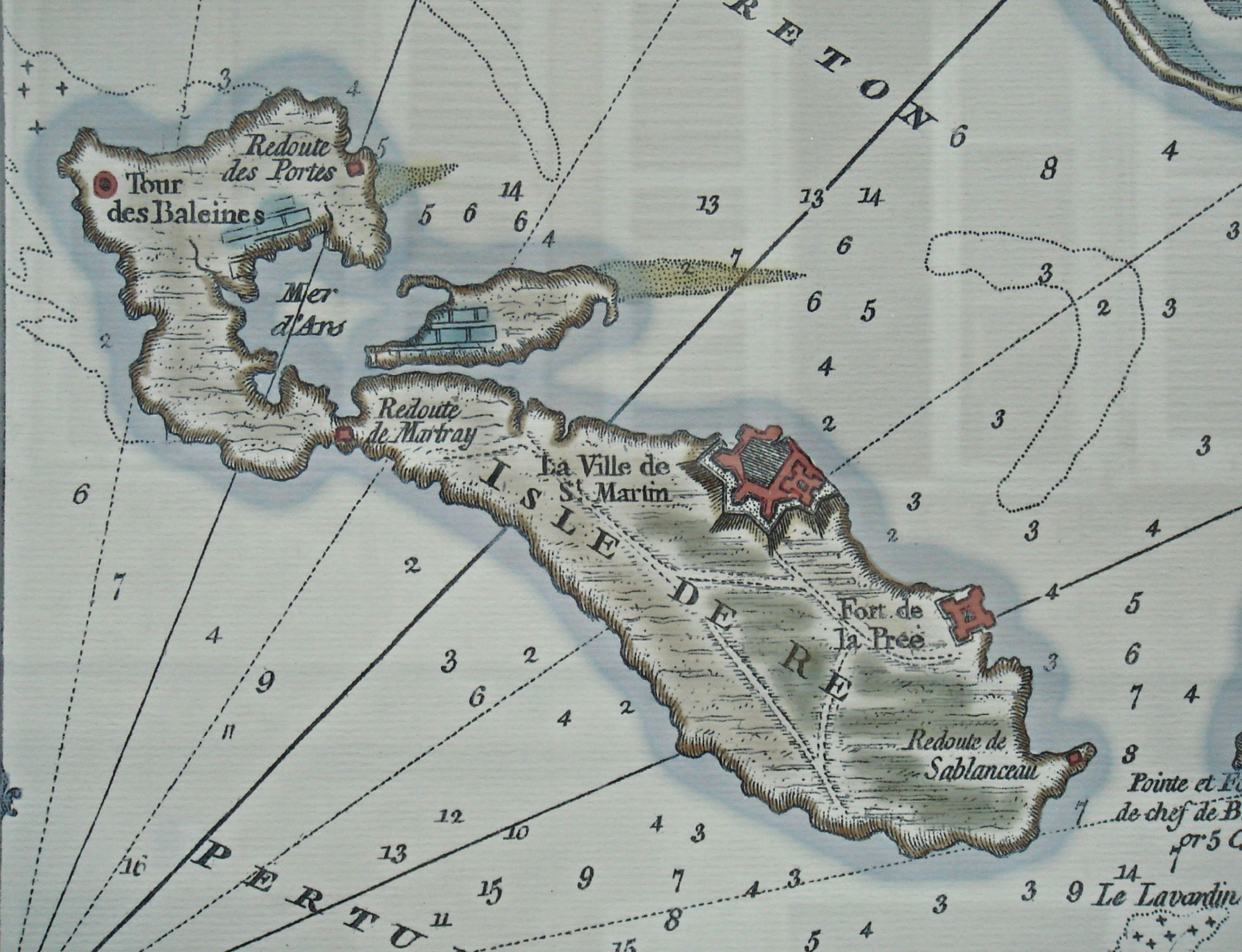
The beach of Sablanceau is at the easternmost end of Île de Ré. Chart of the Road of Basque, 1757.

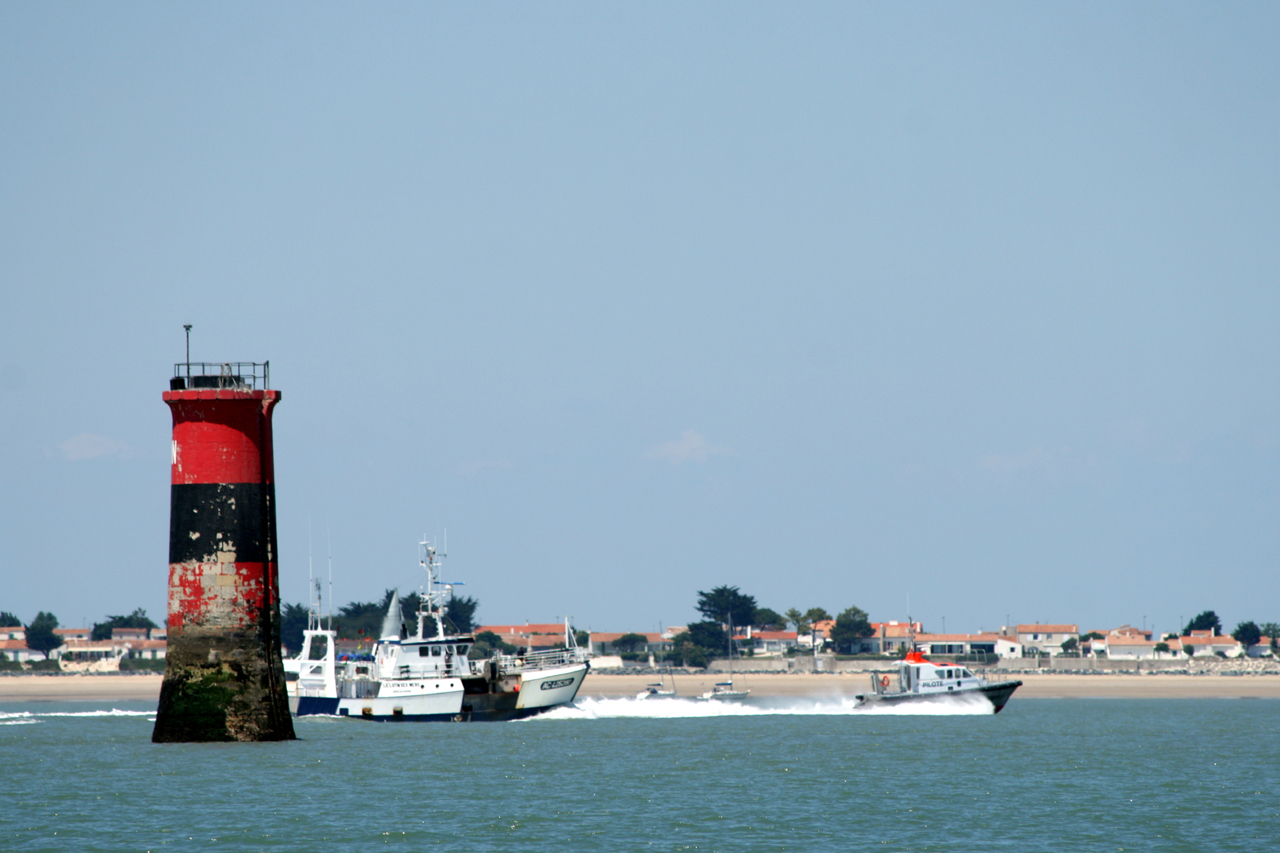
Beach of Sablanceau, seen from the Lavardin.

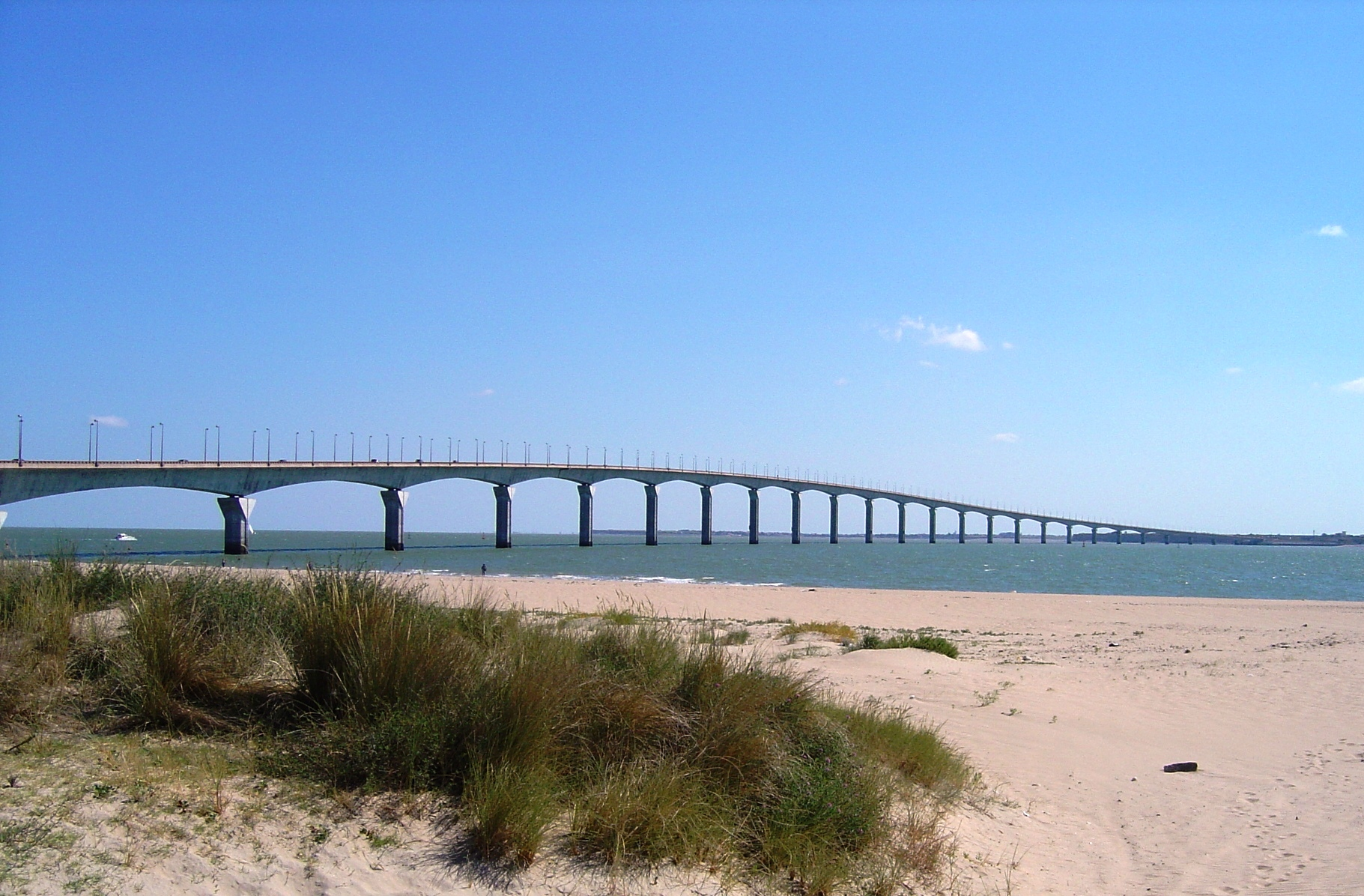
Île de Ré bridge from Sablanceau.

Sablanceau (anciently Saint-Blanceau) is a beach at the easternmost end of the island of Île de Ré in western France. Sablanceau belongs to the commune of Rivedoux-Plage.

== English landing (1627) ==
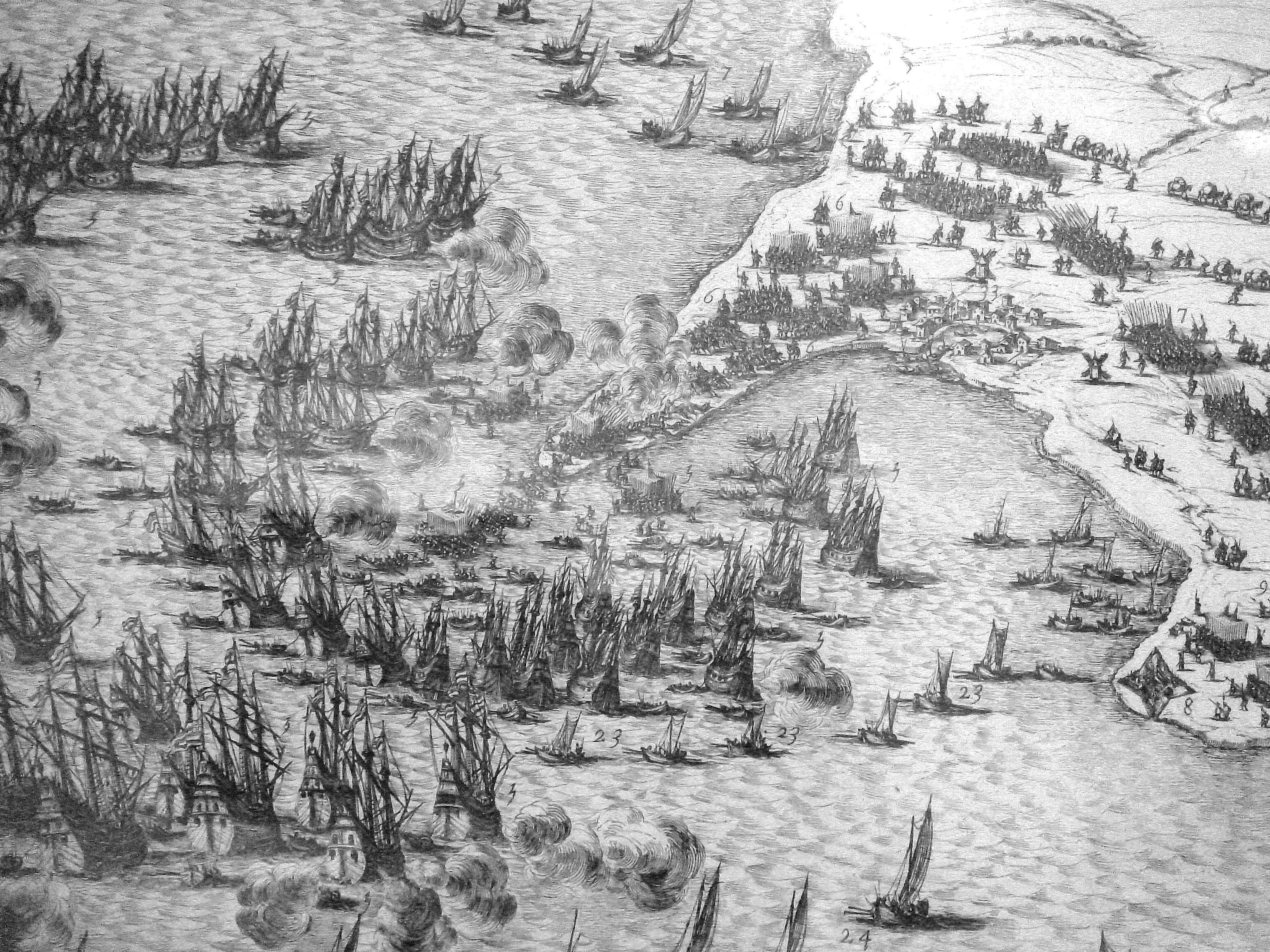
Landing of the Duke of Buckingham in Sablanceau, 1627.

On 12 July 1627, an English invasion force of 100 ships and 6,000 soldiers under the command of the Duke of Buckingham invaded the island of Île de Ré at the beach of Sablanceau, with the objective of controlling the approaches to La Rochelle, and of encouraging the rebellion in the city. Toiras fought against the landing from behind the dunes, with a force of 1,200 infantry and 200 horsemen, but the English beachhead was maintained, with over 12 officers and 100 men dead.

This landing of English troops would be followed a few days later by the dramatic Siege of Saint-Martin-de-Ré (1627).

== Fortifications ==
The vulnerability of the coast to an hostile landing, proven in the English landing of 1627, highlighted the need to create some sort of fortification in the area of Sablanceau.

=== Rivedoux redoubt ===
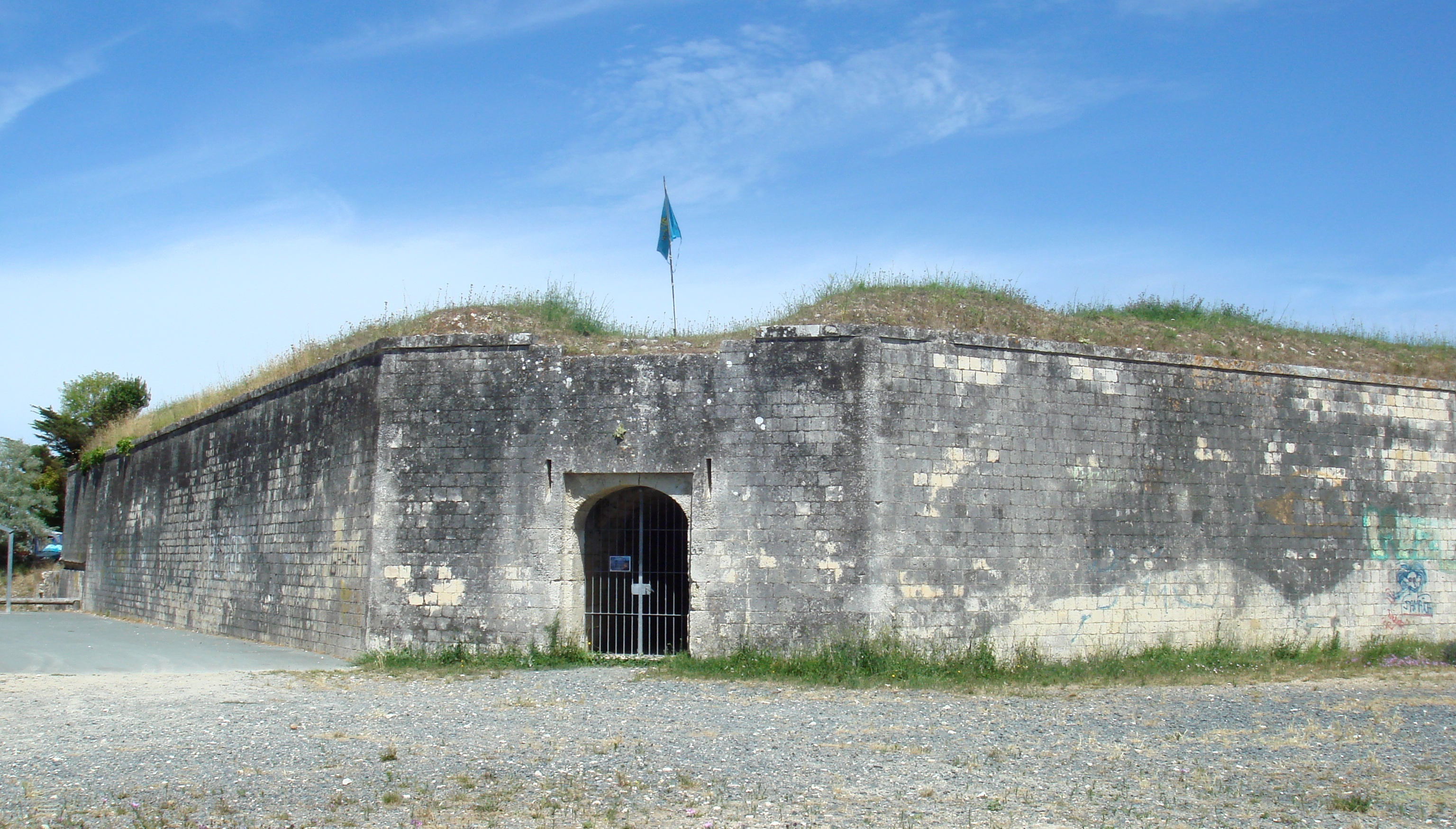
Redoute de Rivedoux.

A redoubt (Fr: "Redoute") was built in 1674 as part of the effort by Vauban to fortify the coast.

The redoubt is square in shape, with two connected projections (called "épaulement") which could be used as artillery platforms. Inside the redoubt, a house for the garrison, a well for water and an underground storage room can be found.

The redoubt was refurbished in 1862 under Napoleon III, with the walls especially being given a smoother finish. The redoubt was again used during World War II by the Germans who established a small defensive artillery base there, as part of their defensive fortifications along the coastline. Fortified "blockhaus" quarters remain from that period.

Visits of the redoubt are now organized by the municipality of Rivedoux-Plage.

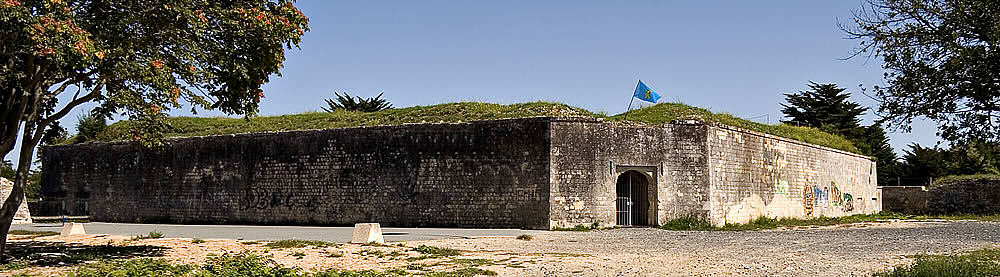
The fortress ("Redoute") of Rivedoux.

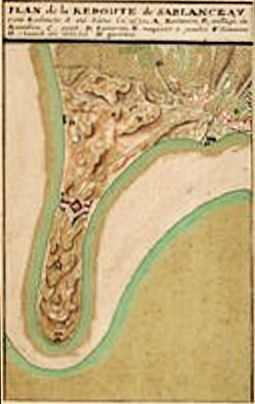
1722 map of the "redoute" of Rivedoux.

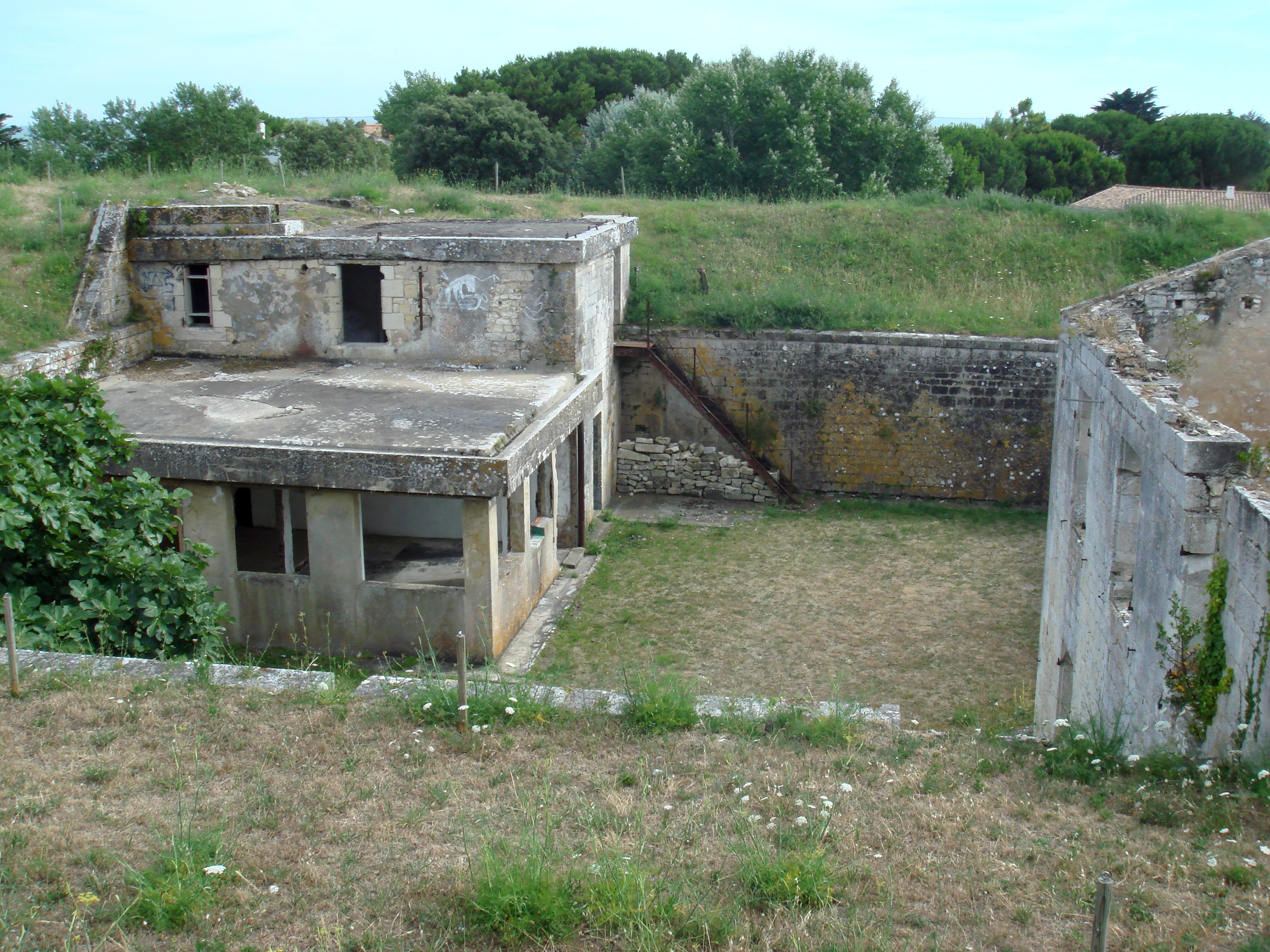
Inside of the Rivedoux Redoute with German era blockhaus (left), and 17th century quarters (right).

=== Sablanceau battery ===
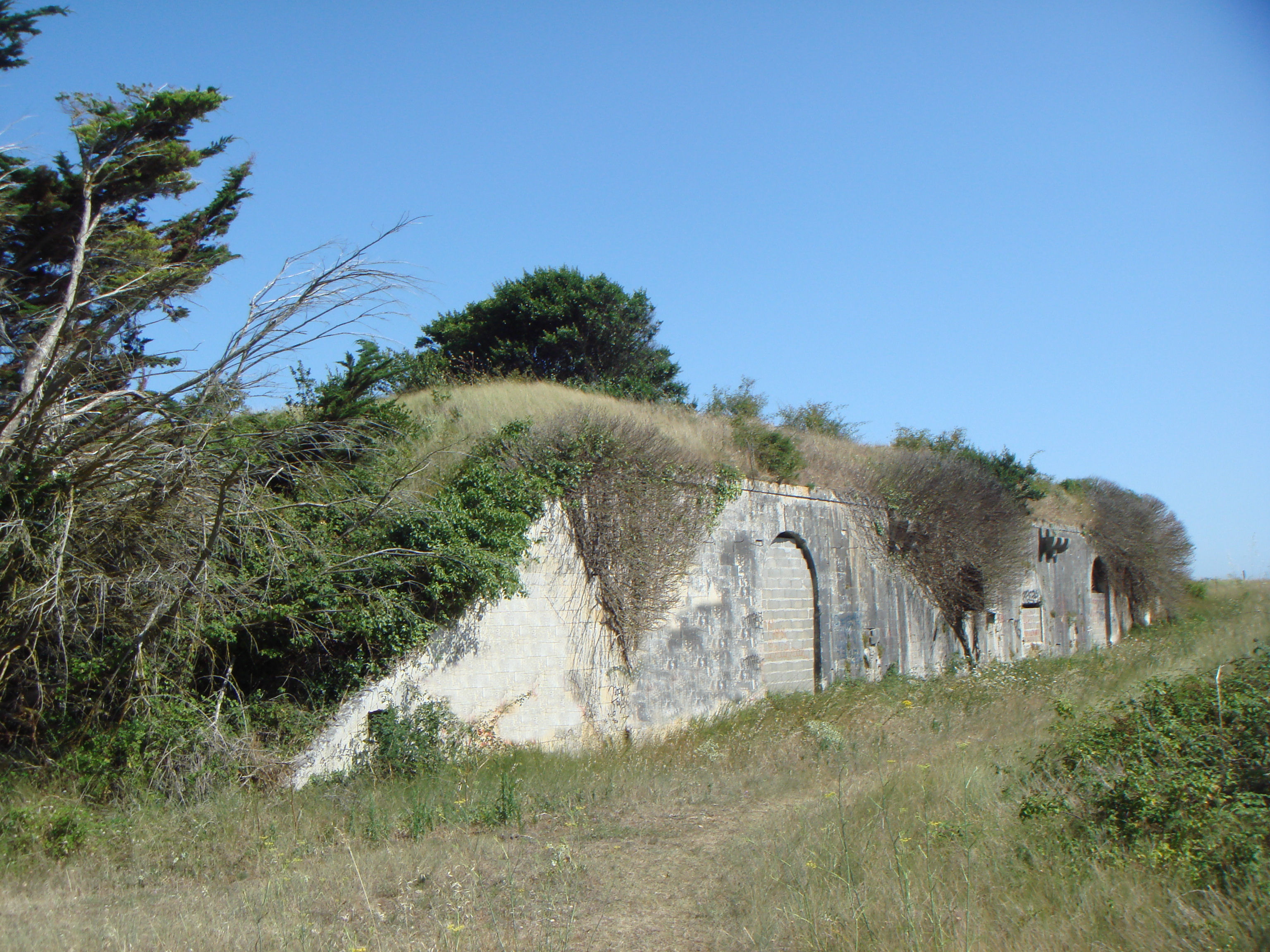
Sablanceau battery, inside view.

In 1701, a forward battery, the "Batterie de Sablanceau", was also built: it was a simple fortification wall covered in grass, which could accommodate 12 cannons. The battery was disarmed in 1827, but again refurbished as an ammunition depot in 1894. The battery remains to this day, and was reinforced by German Blockhaus fortifications during World War II.

The battery cannot be visited, and is circled by barbed wire.

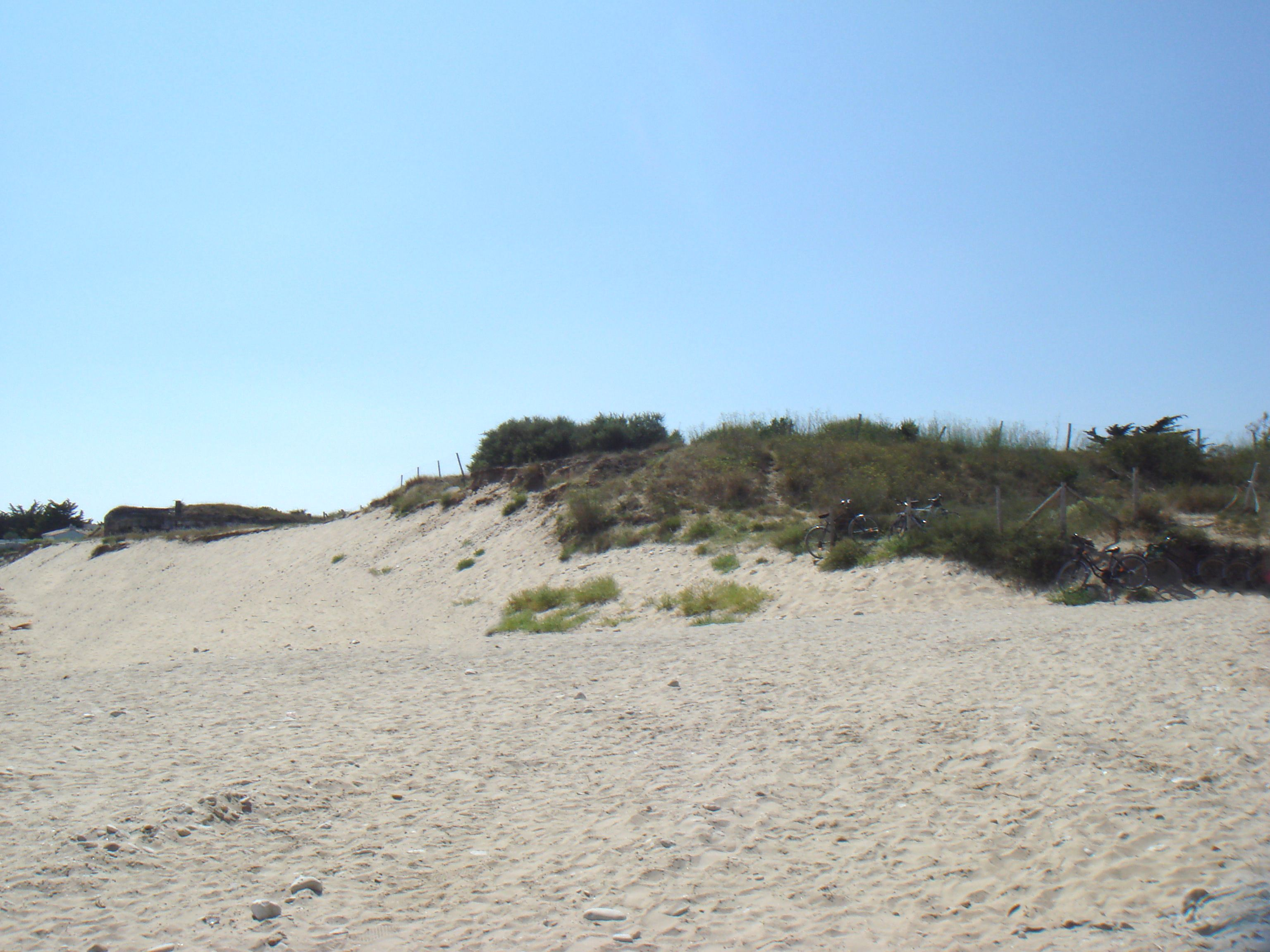
Sablanceau battery, outside view.

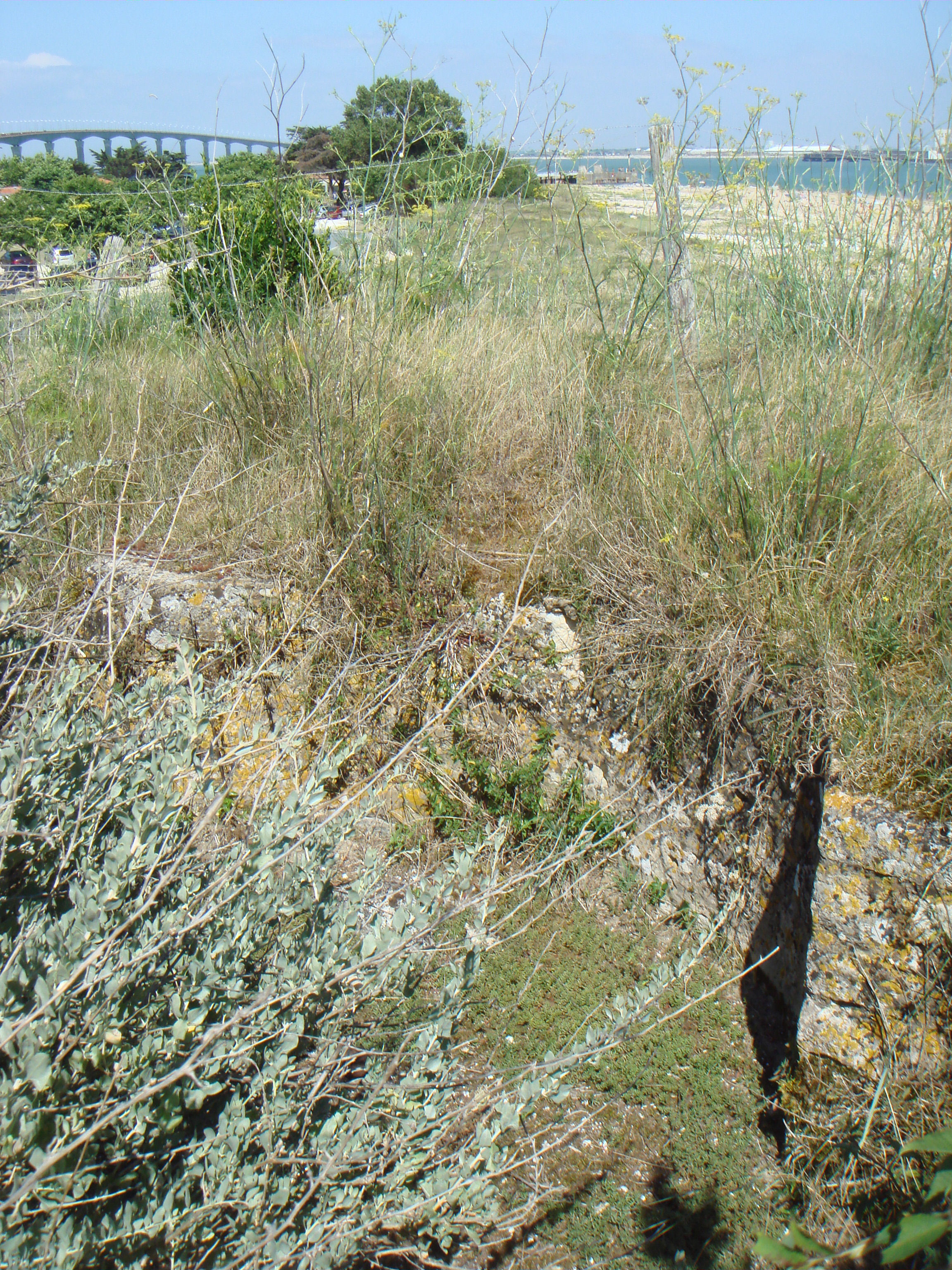
Sablanceau battery gun position.

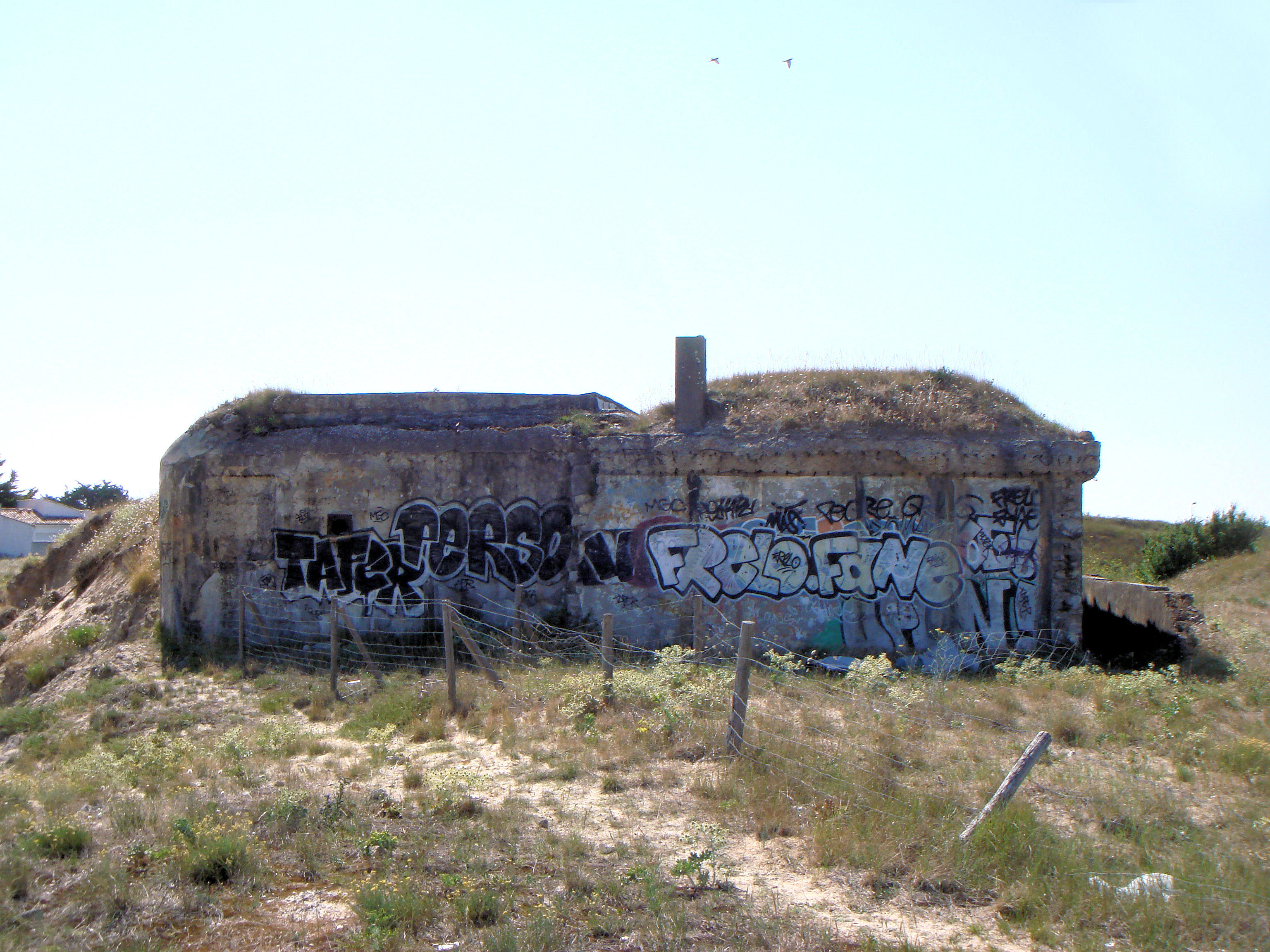
Near the Sablanceau battery, the World War II German battery.
