= Bevisbury =

Iron Age plateau fort in Hampshire, England

Coordinates: 51.2857°N 1.5339°W

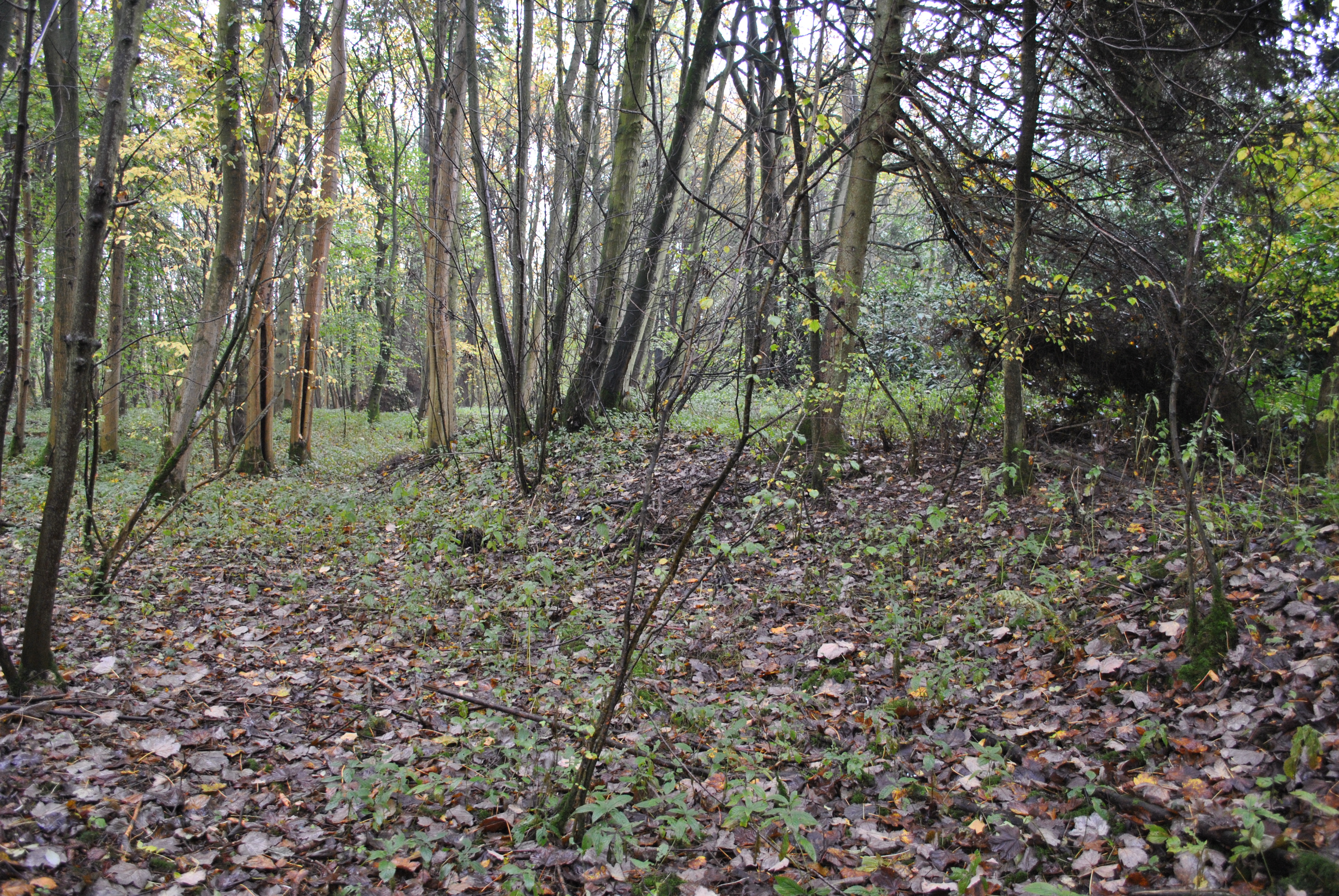

Bevisburyis the site of a former Iron Age plateau fort in Hampshire, England. It is named after the legendary English hero Bevis of Hampton, with bury' denoting a fortified place in Old English.

== Description ==
The fort lies on a chalk ridge and is of a single bank and ditch construction, enclosing an area of 1.7 hectares (4.2 acres). The earthworks are now largely destroyed and overgrown, with the southern ramparts the best preserved. There are several pits that have been cut into and around the site which were probably quarries, and a private house lies within the north-east corner. The site was designated as a scheduled monument in 1951.

== Location ==
The site lies to the east of the village of Chute, in Wiltshire, but itself lies just within the civil parish of Tangley in the county of Hampshire. The site is bisected by a Roman road, now Hungerford Lane, which travels broadly north-west to south-east, and runs between Winchester and Mildenhall (near Marlborough). To the east lies the area of Well Bottom and Forty Acre Wood, and to the south-west is Cathanger Wood. The site lies at a height of 220 metres (720 ft) AOD.

- Map sources for Bevisbury
