= Vernham Dean =

Village and parish in Hampshire, England

Coordinates: 51.307380°N 1.51183°W

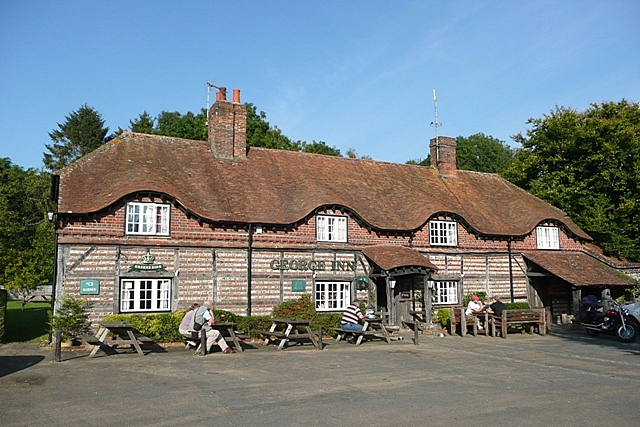
- George Inn at Vernham Dean

- Location within Hampshire
- Area: 15.85 km^{2} (6.12 sq mi)
- Population: 552 (2011 Census)
  - Density: 35/km^{2} (91/sq mi)
- OS grid reference: SU3412556587
- District: Test Valley
- Shire county: Hampshire
- Region: South East
- Country: England
- Sovereign state: United Kingdom
- Post town: ANDOVER
- Postcode district: SP11
- Dialling code: 01264
- Police: Hampshire and Isle of Wight
- Fire: Hampshire and Isle of Wight
- Ambulance: South Central
- UK Parliament: North West Hampshire

Vernham Dean, sometimes known as Vernhams Dean, is a village and civil parish in the Test Valley district of Hampshire, England, just east of the Wiltshire border and south of the Berkshire border. The village is about 9 miles (14 km) north of Andover and 9 miles (14 km) miles south of Hungerford in Berkshire.

According to the 2011 census the civil parish, which has an area of 15.85 square kilometres (6.12 sq mi), had a population of 552. It is bounded by the civil parishes of Buttermere, Combe, Linkenholt, Hurstbourne Tarrant, Tangley, Chute, and Tidcombe and Fosbury.

In the village there is The George pub and the Millennium Hall which is used for a variety of community events and services and for private hire. The village is served by the Vernham Dean Gillum's Church of England Primary School and the Little Fingers Pre-school.

There is a legend that Chute Causeway is haunted by a guilt-ridden pastor of Vernham Dean who left his villagers to die of the Black Death in 1665.
