= Île de Ré bridge =

Île de Ré bridge Pont de l'île de Ré
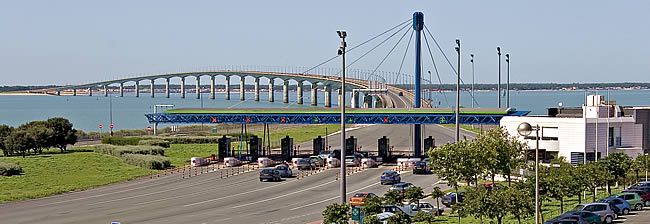
- Ile de Ré Bridge and toll
- Coordinates: 46°10′18″N 01°14′21″W
- Locale: Charente-Maritime, France

Characteristics
- Design: Box girder bridge
- Material: Prestressed concrete
- Total length: 2,926.5 m (9,601 ft)
- Width: 15.5 m (51 ft)
- Height: 42 m (138 ft)

History
- Architect: Michel Virlogeux; Charles Lavigne; Alain Montois; Pham X. Thao; Michel Placidi
- Constructed by: Bouygues
- Construction start: 1986
- Construction end: 1988
- Opened: 19 March 1988

Location
- Interactive map of Île de Ré bridge

The Île de Ré bridge is located in the French departement of Charente-Maritime, on the western coast of France, and connects the mainland (La Rochelle) to the Île de Ré via a 2,926.5-meter-long curve, culminating at 42 meters above sea level. Built by Bouygues and financed by the Charente-Maritime, the bridge was opened to traffic on May 19, 1988.

It is the second longest bridge in France, behind the Saint-Nazaire Bridge (1975) and ahead of the Ile d'Oléron Bridge.
