= Tidcombe and Fosbury =

Civil parish in Wiltshire, England

Coordinates: 51.32°N 01.57°W

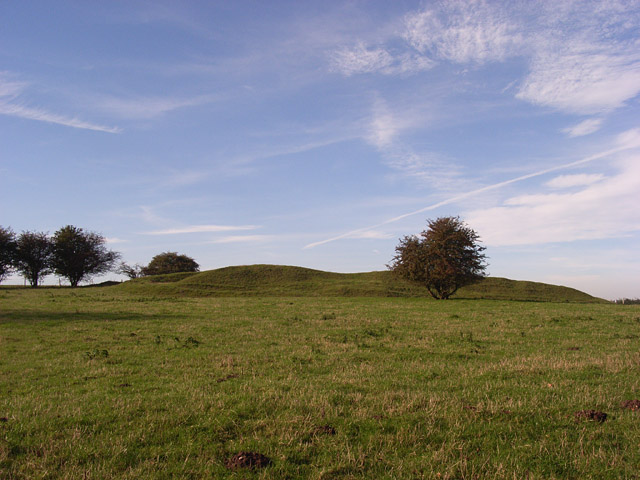
- Long barrow, Tidcombe

- Location within Wiltshire
- Population: 93 (in 2001)
- OS grid reference: SU3058
- Unitary authority: Wiltshire
- Ceremonial county: Wiltshire
- Region: South West
- Country: England
- Sovereign state: United Kingdom
- Post town: Marlborough
- Postcode district: SN8
- Dialling code: 01264
- Police: Wiltshire
- Fire: Dorset and Wiltshire
- Ambulance: South Western
- UK Parliament: East Wiltshire

Tidcombe and Fosbury is a civil parish in Wiltshire, England, about 10 miles (16 km) southeast of Marlborough and 7 miles (11 km) south of Hungerford, Berkshire. It includes the three small settlements of Fosbury, Tidcombe, and Hippenscombe and lies on the eastern edge of the county, where Wiltshire meets Hampshire.

The Iron Age hill fort of Fosbury Camp is in the south of the parish.

The population of the parish peaked around the time of the 1861 census, when 274 were recorded; by 2001 numbers had declined to 93. Rather than a parish council it has a parish meeting, with all electors entitled to attend and vote at meetings.

Anciently the lands of Tidcombe and Fosbury were separated by a tongue of Shalbourne parish, which until 1895 was in Berkshire. Hippenscombe, formerly an extra-parochial area southwest of Fosbury, was added to the parish in 1894, and at the same time the modern name of the parish was adopted; it had previously been named Tidcombe. In 1934 almost all of the tongue – 501 acres, with a population of 20 in 1931 – was transferred to Tidcombe and Fosbury.

The parish was part of the former district of Kennet until April 2009. Most significant local government functions are carried out by Wiltshire Council, a unitary authority. At the parliamentary level, the parish is part of the East Wiltshire county constituency.
