= Île de Ré =

Island off the coast of France

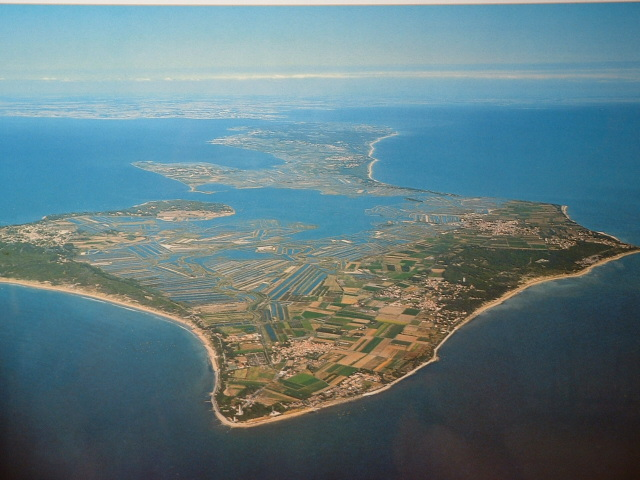
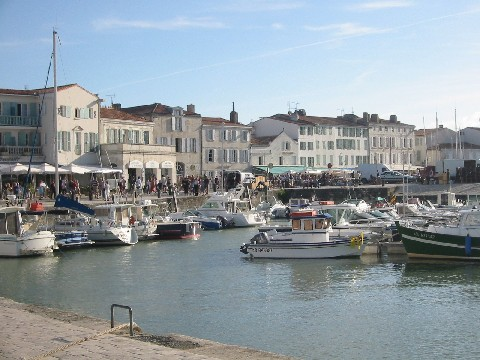
- Aerial view; Saint-Martin-de-Ré harbour

- Location within Poitou-Charentes

Geography
- Location: Atlantic Ocean
- Coordinates: 46°12′N 1°25′W
- Area: 85 km^{2} (33 sq mi)
- Length: 30 km (19 mi)
- Width: 5 km (3.1 mi)
- Highest elevation: 20 m (70 ft)
- Highest point: Peu des Aumonts

Administration
- France
- Region: Nouvelle-Aquitaine
- Department: Charente-Maritime
- Arrondissement: La Rochelle
- Capital city: Saint-Martin-de-Ré
- Largest settlement: La Flotte

Demographics
- Population: 17,723 (2012)
- Pop. density: 208.5/km^{2} (540/sq mi)
- Ethnic groups: French people

Île de Ré (French pronunciation: [il də ʁe]; variously spelled Rhé or Rhéa; Poitevin: ile de Rét; English: Isle of Ré, /reɪ/ RAY) is an island off the Atlantic coast of France near La Rochelle, Charente-Maritime, on the northern side of the Pertuis d'Antioche strait. Its highest point has an elevation of 20 metres (66 feet). It is 30 kilometres (19 miles) long and five kilometres (3 miles) wide. The 2.9 km (1.8 mi) Île de Ré bridge, completed in 1988, connects it to La Rochelle on the mainland.

== Administration ==
Administratively, the island is part of the Charente-Maritime department, Nouvelle-Aquitaine (before 2015: Poitou-Charentes). The island is also a part of the Charente-Maritime's 1st constituency.

Located in the arrondissement of La Rochelle, Île de Ré includes two cantons: Saint-Martin-de-Ré eastwards and Ars-en-Ré westwards. The island is divided into 10 communes, from east to west: Rivedoux-Plage, La Flotte, Sainte-Marie-de-Ré, Saint-Martin-de-Ré, Le Bois-Plage-en-Ré, La Couarde-sur-Mer, Loix, Ars-en-Ré, Saint-Clément-des-Baleines, Les Portes-en-Ré.

== History ==
During Roman times, Île de Ré was an archipelago consisting of three small islands. The space between the islands was progressively filled by a combination of human activity (salt fields gained from the sea) and silting.

In the seventh and eighth centuries the island, along with Oléron, formed the Vacetae Insulae or Vacetian Islands, according to the Cosmographia. Since Vaceti is another name for the Vascones, this reference is evidence of Basque (Gascon) settlement or control of the islands by that date. In 745, Hunald, the Duke of Aquitaine, retired to a monastery on the island. In the mid-twelfth century, a Cistercian monastery was founded on the isle, where the Abbot Isaac of Stella sojourned amid the Becket controversy.

The island became English in 1154, when Eleanor of Aquitaine became queen of England through her marriage with Henry Plantagenet. The island reverted to France in 1243, when Henry III of England returned it to Louis IX through a treaty. In 1360, however, with the Treaty of Brétigny, Île de Ré briefly became English again, until the 1370s.

The first fishing locks were constructed between the 13th and 15th centuries. The locks consist of fixed fish traps which become submerged at high tide and retain the fish when the tide goes out.

=== Capture (1625) ===
In February 1625, the Protestant Duke of Soubise led a Huguenot revolt against the French king Louis XIII, and after publishing a manifesto, invaded and occupied the island of Ré. He seized Ré with 300 soldiers and 100 sailors. From there he sailed up to Brittany, where he led his successful attack on the royal fleet in Blavet, although he could not take the fort after a three-week siege. Soubise then returned to Ré with 15 ships and soon occupied the Ile d'Oléron as well, thus giving him command of the Atlantic coast from Nantes to Bordeaux. Through these actions, he was recognized as the head of the reform, and named himself "Admiral of the Protestant Church". A few months later, in September 1625, Charles, Duke of Guise, organized a landing in order to recapture the islands, with the support of the Dutch (20 ships) and English navies. The fleet of La Rochelle was defeated, as was Soubise with 3,000 men, when he led a counter-attack against the royal troops who had landed on the island. The island was invested, forcing Soubise to flee to England.

=== Siege of Saint-Martin-de-Ré (1627) ===
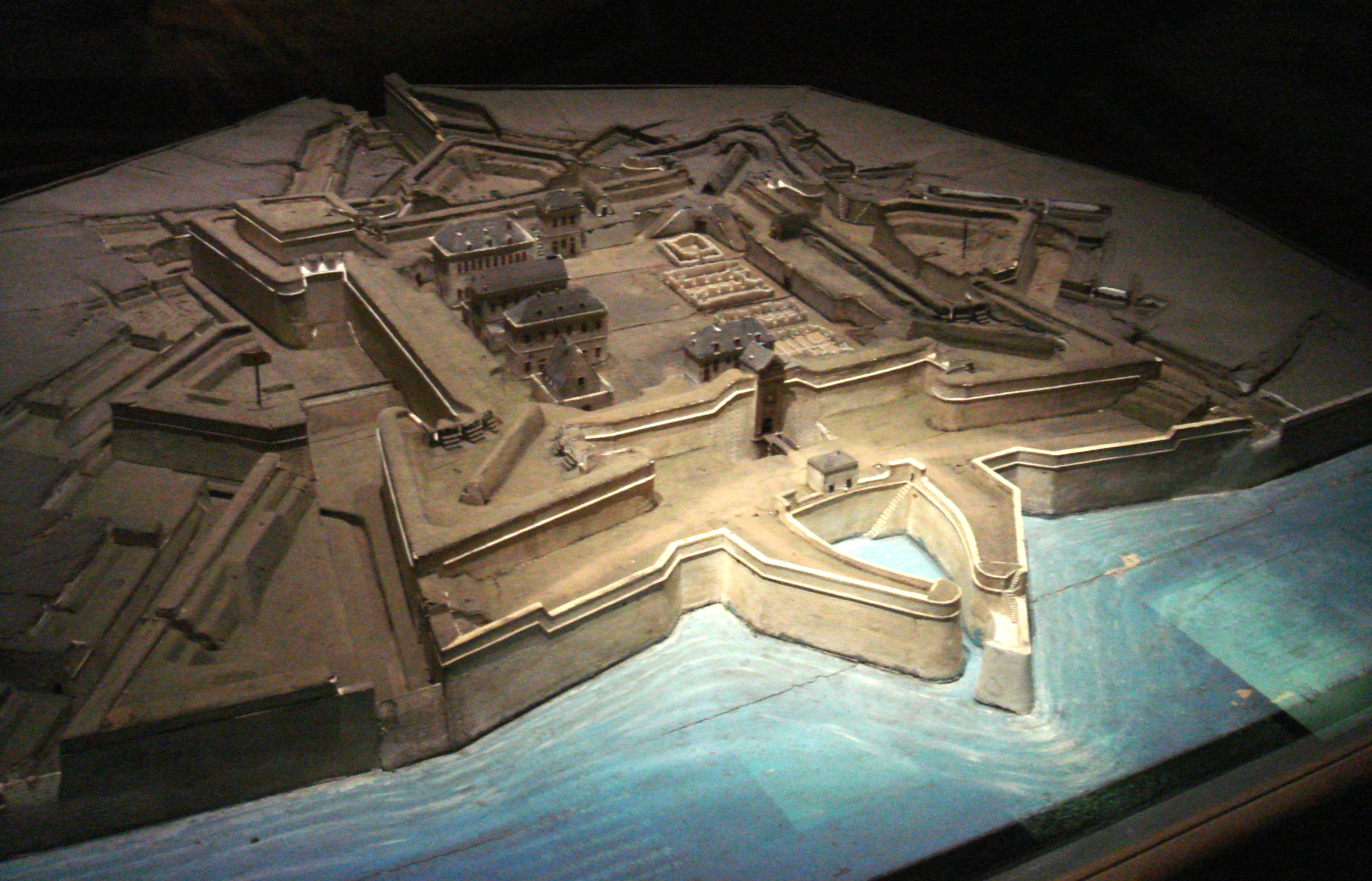
The citadel of Saint-Martin; military mock-up, 1702, Musée des Plans-Reliefs

In 1627, an English invasion force under the command of George Villiers, Duke of Buckingham, attacked the island in order to relieve the Siege of La Rochelle. Buckingham's forces were poorly equipped and failed to even scale the walls of the citadel as their scaling ladders were too short. After three months of combat in the Siege of Saint-Martin-de-Ré against the French under Marshal Toiras, the Duke was forced to withdraw. The English lost more than 4,000 out of 7,000 troops during the campaign.

=== Later history ===
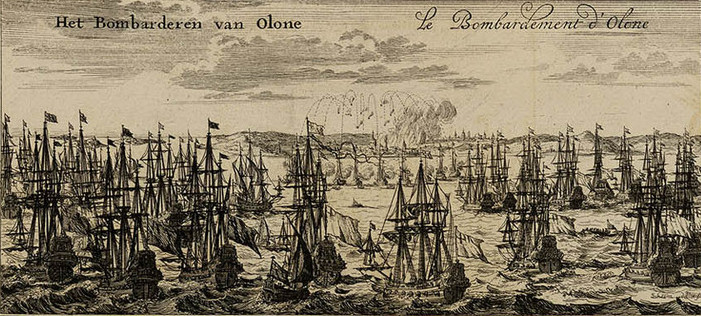
The naval bombardment of St Martin, Île de Ré, by British and Dutch fleets on 15 and 16 July 1696

The main port, Saint-Martin, was fortified by Vauban in 1681 as a component of the belt of forts and citadels built to protect the military harbour of Rochefort. It was later used as a depot for convicts on their way to the penal settlements of New Caledonia and French Guiana. Prisoners included Alfred Dreyfus, en route to the penal colony of Devil's Island after his conviction for treason.

The old city of Saint-Martin, within the walls of the citadel, was added in 2008 to the World Heritage Site list, along with 11 other Fortifications of Vauban across France.

During World War II, the beaches of the Île de Ré were fortified by German forces with bunkers, in order to block a possible seaward invasion. Many of the bunkers are still visible, in a more or less derelict state. Several scenes of the 1962 movie The Longest Day were filmed on the beaches of the island.

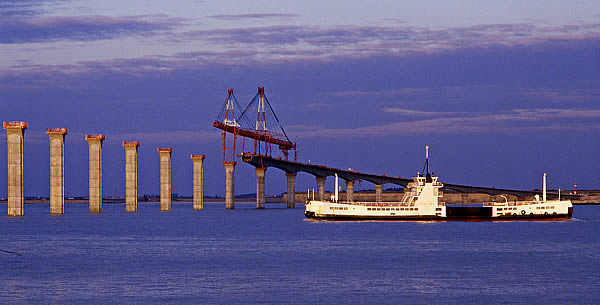
A bac and the bridge under construction, in 1987

=== Connection to the mainland ===
In 1987, a 2.9-kilometre (1.8 mi) bridge was built to connect the island to the mainland. Previously, the island was connected through roll-on roll-off ferries (called "bacs"), which could accommodate vehicles and passengers. In peak summer time periods, the waiting time to board a ferry could reach several hours. The bridge was built by Bouygues. Since then, tourism on the island has developed considerably, with real estate prices reaching high levels. The easier transportation system has stimulated the purchase of holiday homes by people from as far as Paris, who can visit for week-ends, mostly in spring and summer. Using the bridge requires the payment of a toll (either €8 or €16 return for a normal car depending on the season) and makes it the most expensive road to use per kilometre in France. The Paris-La Rochelle high-speed train (TGV) trip takes around three hours, and then taxis or buses can be taken to the island. Île de Ré can also be reached from Paris by plane. It takes 85 minutes to fly from Paris to La Rochelle airport.

After the TF1 channel was purchased by Bouygues, the talk-show Droit de réponse (Right to reply), shown on prime-time Saturday evening by Michel Polac was suppressed after criticizing this bridge.

== Life ==
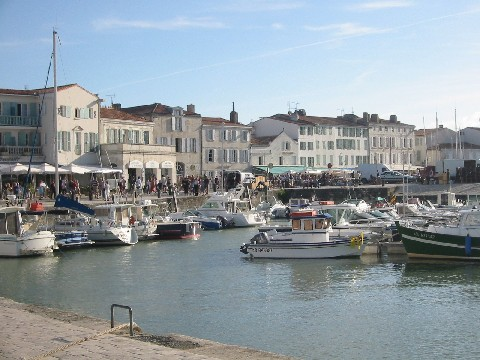
The quays at Saint Martin en Ré

The area is a popular tourist destination. It has approximately the same number of hours of sunshine as the southern coast of France. The island has a constant light breeze, and the water temperature is generally cool. The island is surrounded by sandy beaches.

The island has a year-round resident population of approximately 17,650 residents and a summer resident population of about 220,000. The island has a network of cycle tracks, with many residents rarely using cars for transportation.

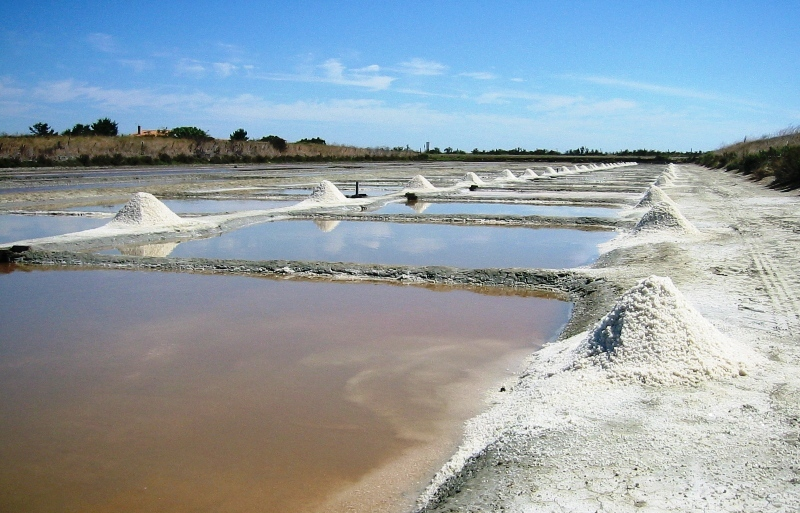
Sea salt harvest in Ile de Ré

American celebrities, including Johnny Depp, Katy Perry, and British actor Orlando Bloom, have holidayed there. Visiting French celebrities include Charles Aznavour, Claude Nougaro, Bernard Giraudeau, Claude Rich, Carole Bouquet, Philippe Sollers, and Caroline of Monaco. French politicians, including Jean Monnet and ex-Prime Minister Lionel Jospin, have lived on the island.

Oysters and fresh fish are caught year-round. A tradition sees fishermen sell a small quantity of their catch directly on the quays after a harvest, enabling them to buy a drink. Markets are open in the main towns.

The island is known for donkeys wearing culottes (trousers), originally a bite prevention method but now a tourist attraction.

== Miscellaneous ==
Nearby Fort Boyard, a Napoleonic maritime fort, is currently used for a television game show series of the same name.

Île de Ré is one of the few locations in the world where cross seas produce a square grid of waves.

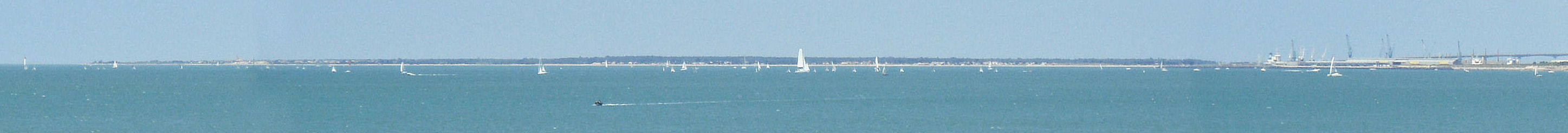
Panoramic view of Ile de Ré from the mainland (in La Pointe du Chay). The bridge linking the island to the mainland is visible at the extreme right.

== Media ==
Ré à la Hune is a free information newspaper and website founded in 2007.

== See also ==
- Ernest Cognacq Museum
- Phare de Chauveau

== Gallery ==
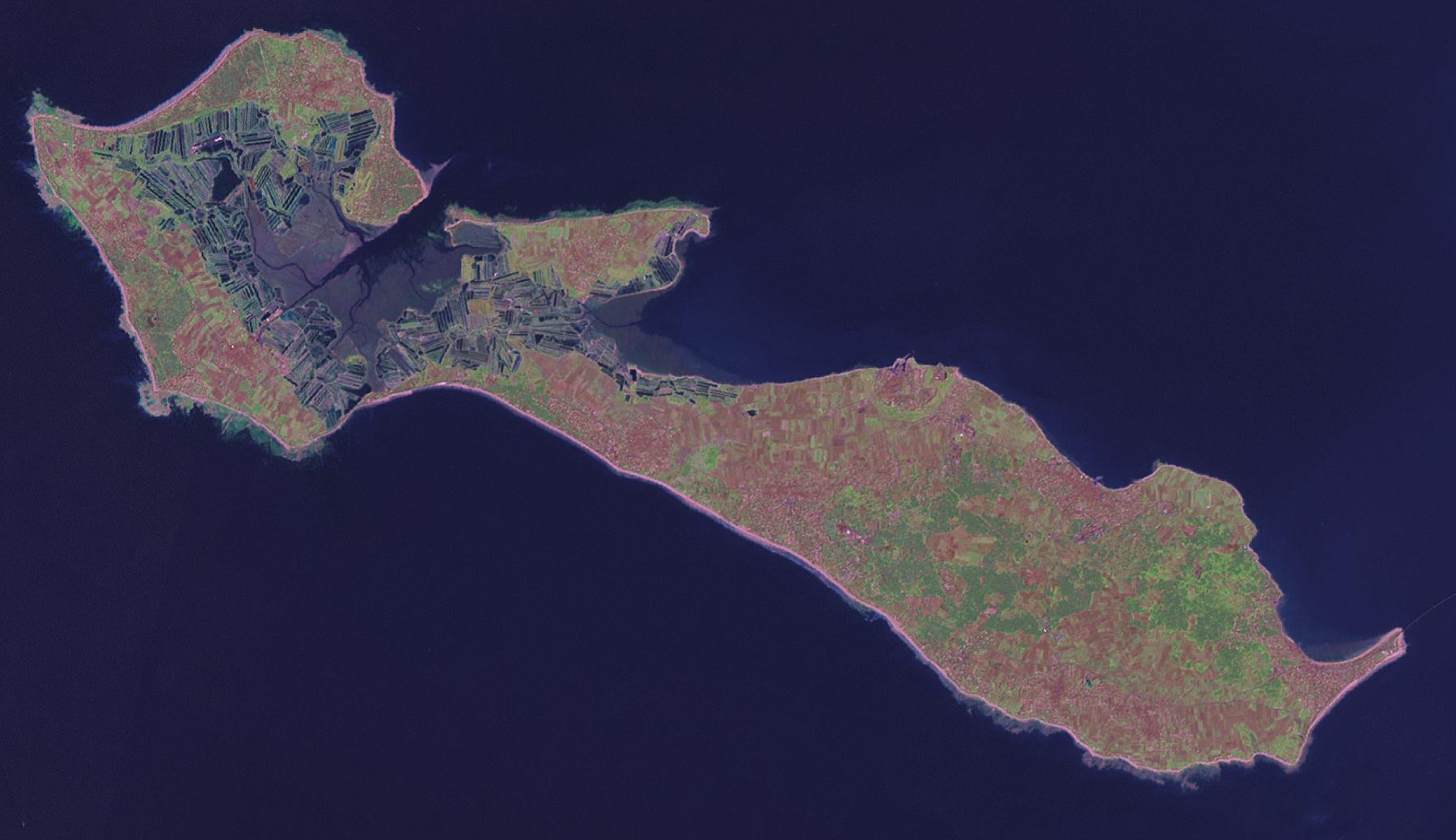
Satellite view of the island

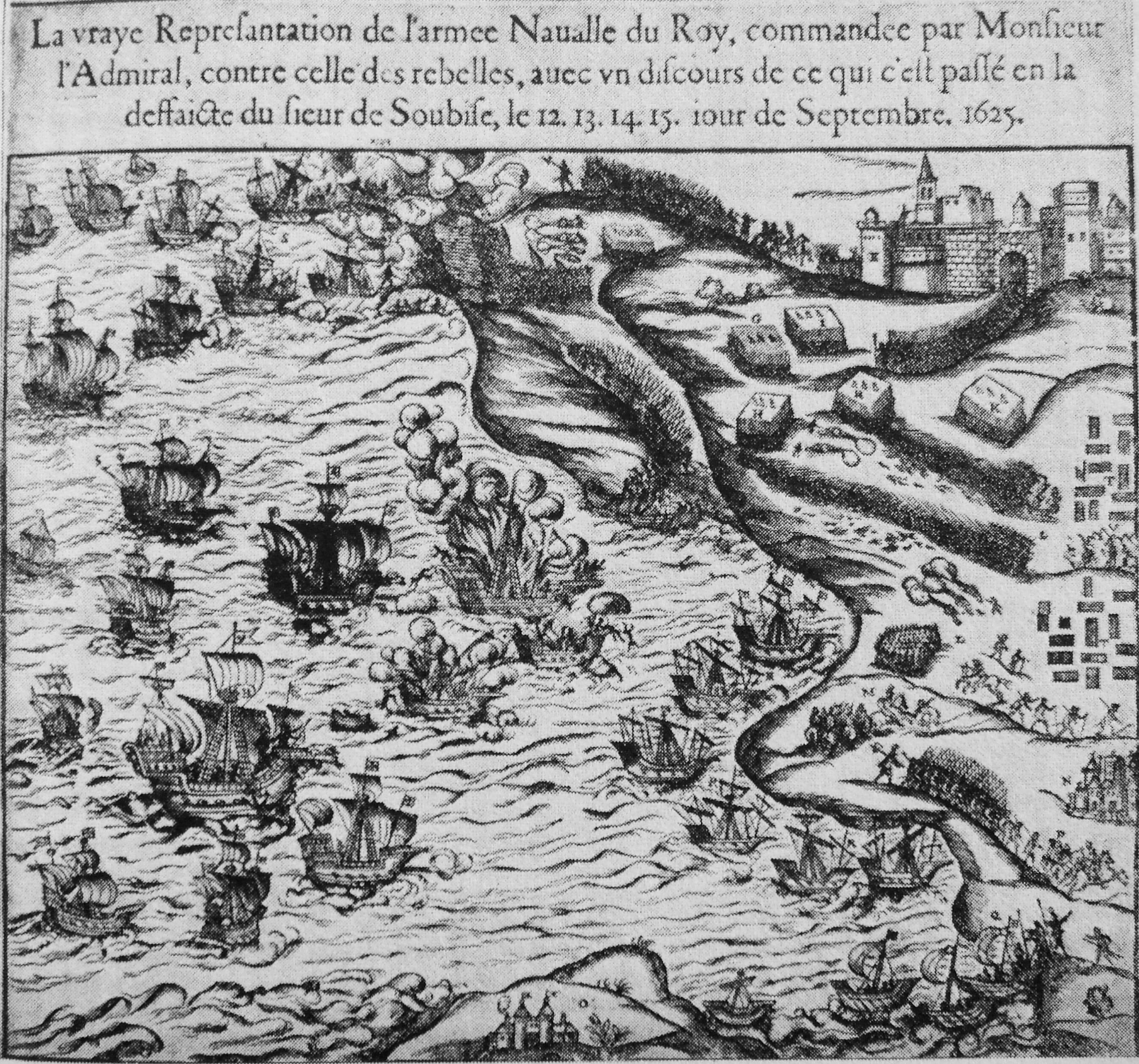
Capture of Île de Ré by Charles, Duke of Guise, on September 16, 1625

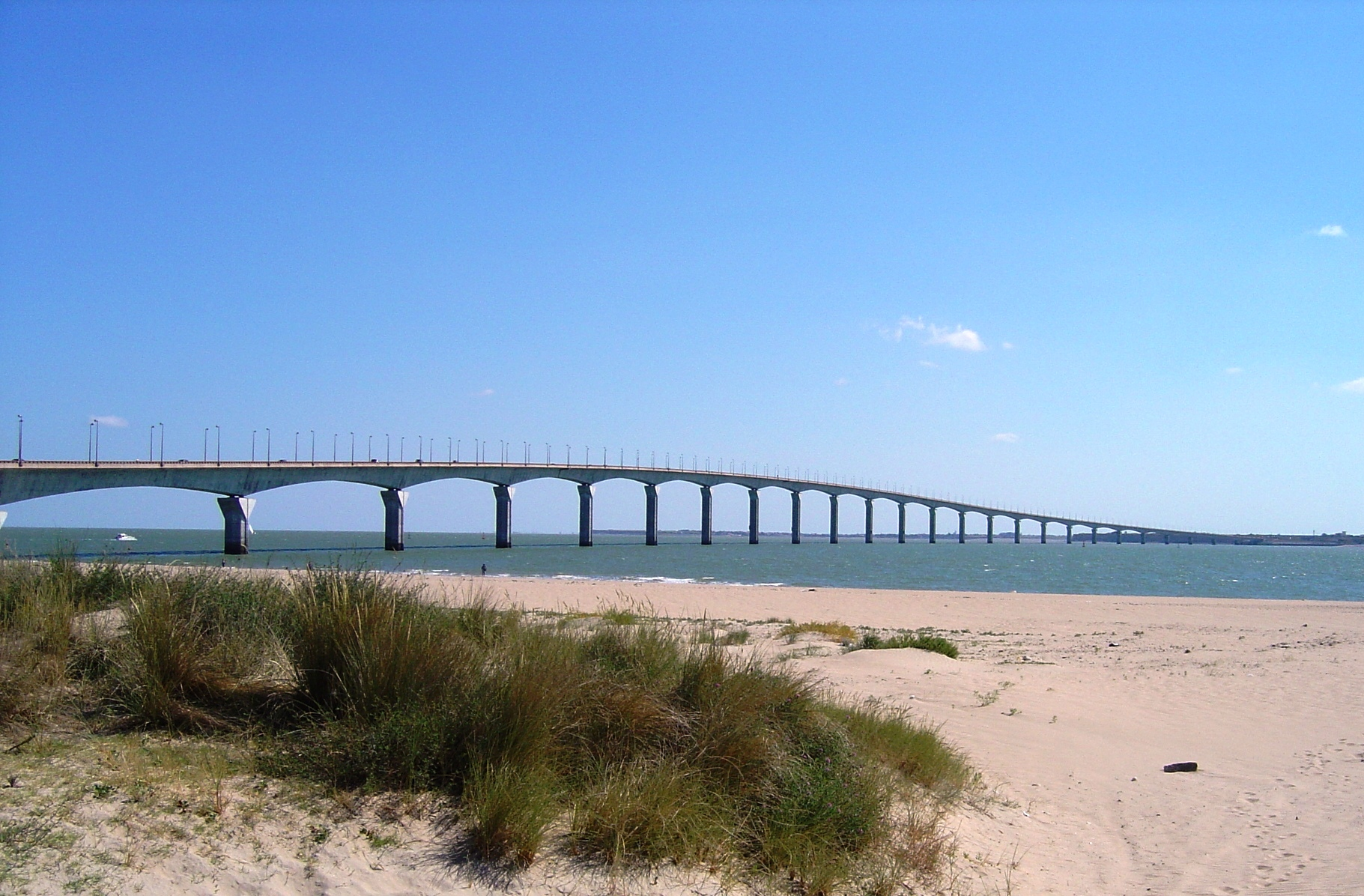
Île de Ré bridge from Sablanceau/ Rivedoux-Plage

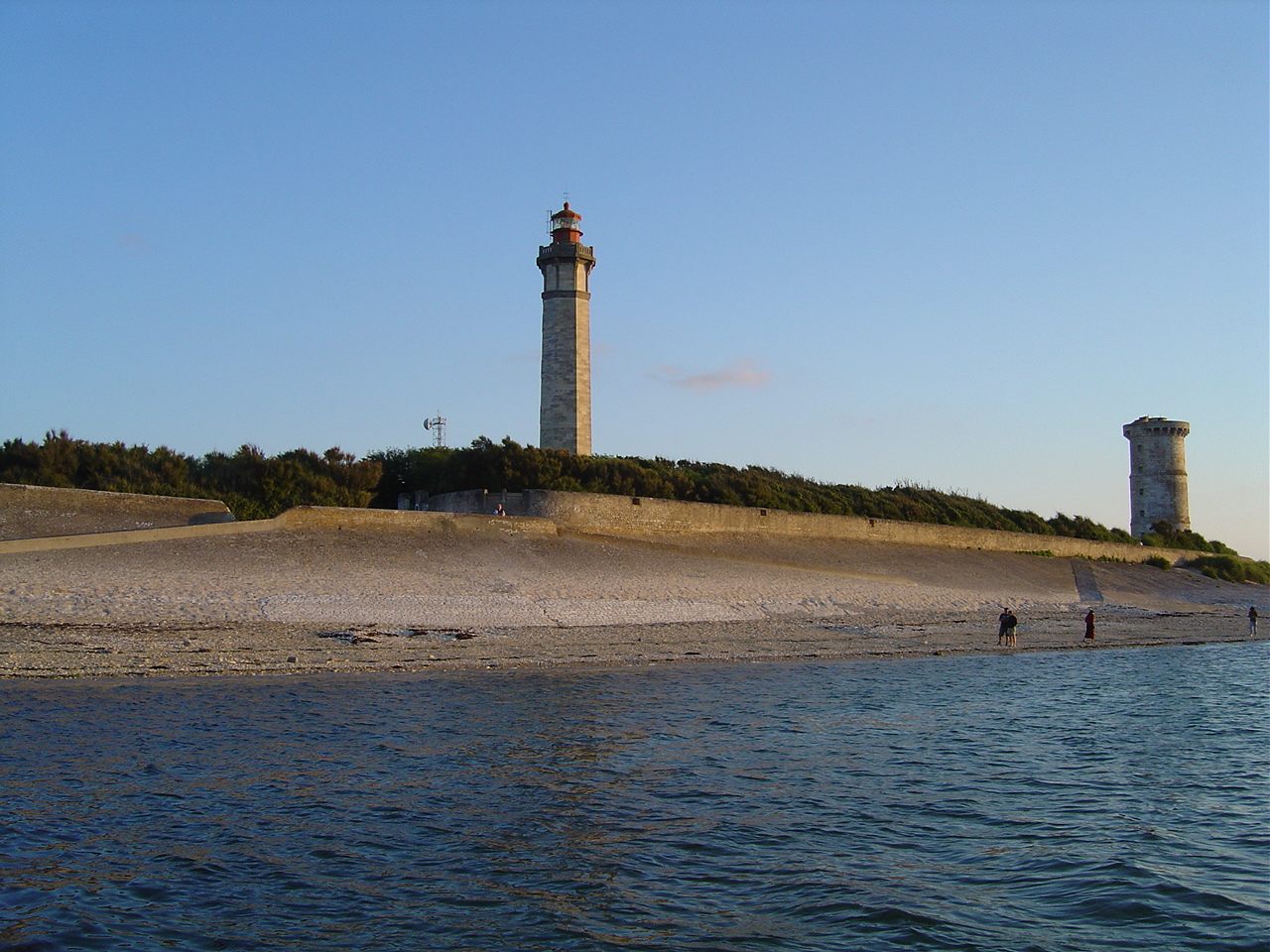
The Phares des Baleines lighthouse

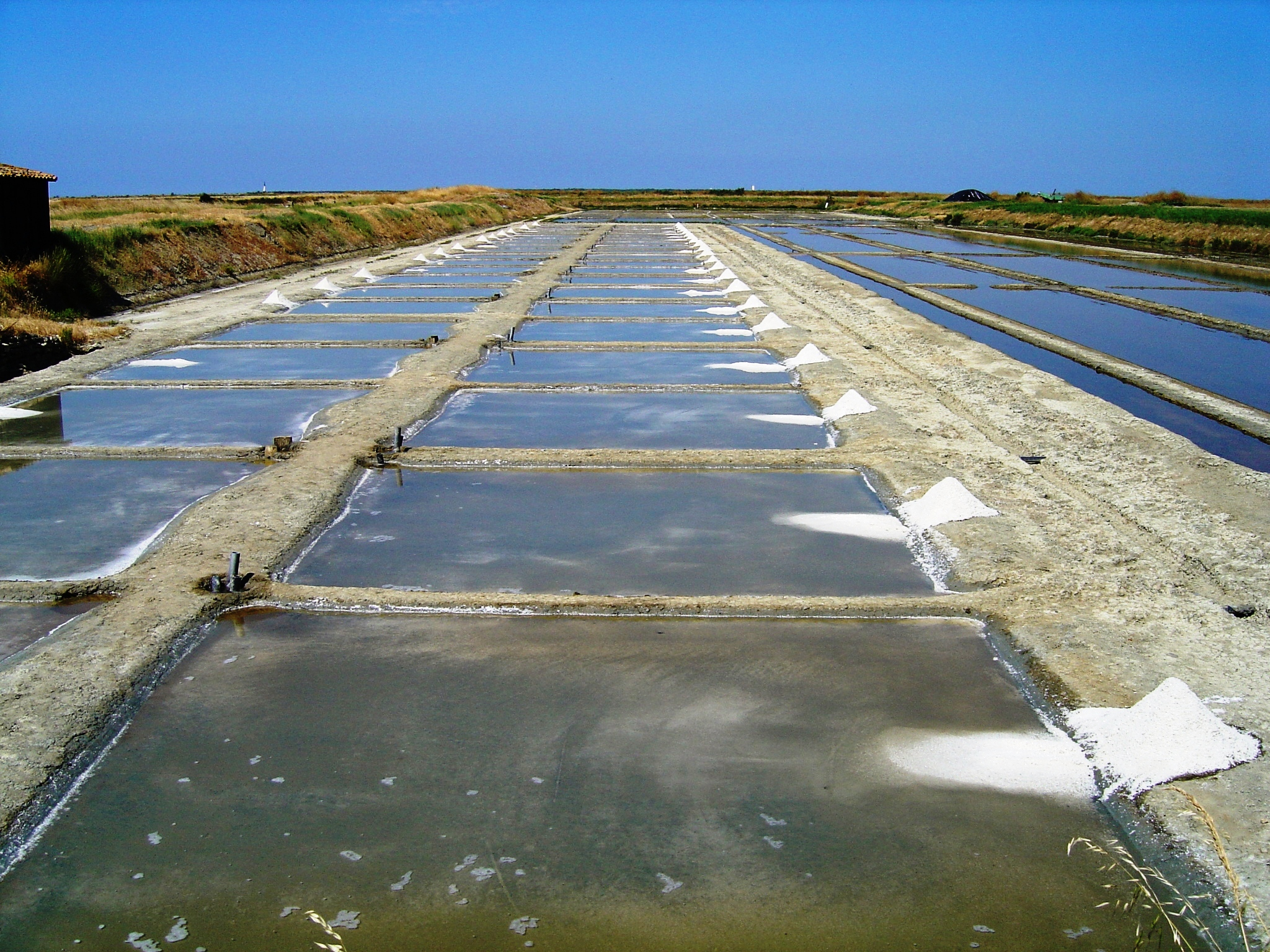
Salt fields in Loix-en-Ré

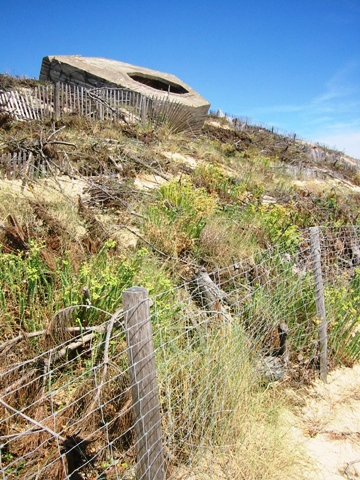
A WWII German bunker on a beach in Île de Ré (Plage des Quatre Sergents)

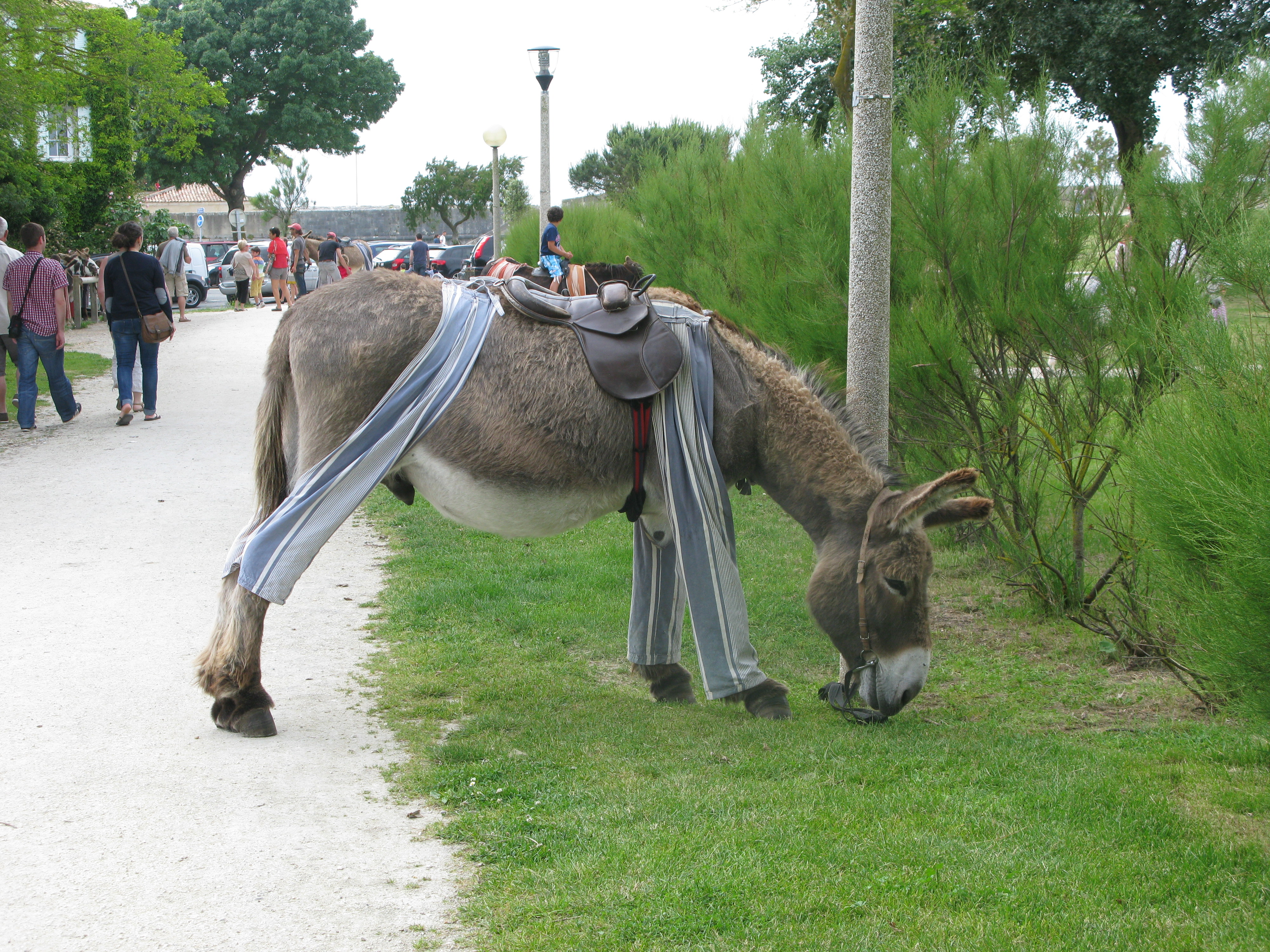
Âne en culotte donkey at Saint-Martin-de-Ré

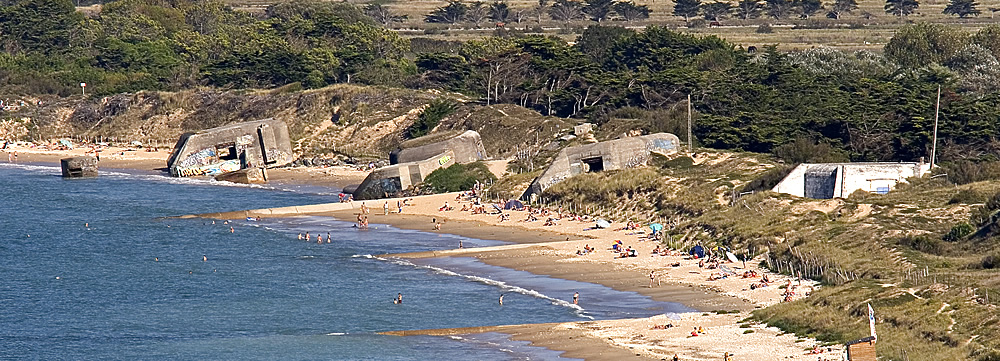
German bunkers in the northern part of the island (Conche des Baleines)

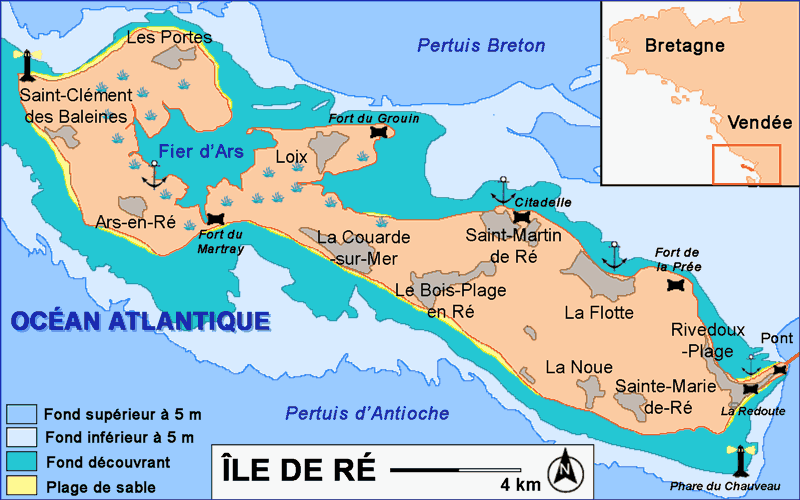
Map of the island (in French)

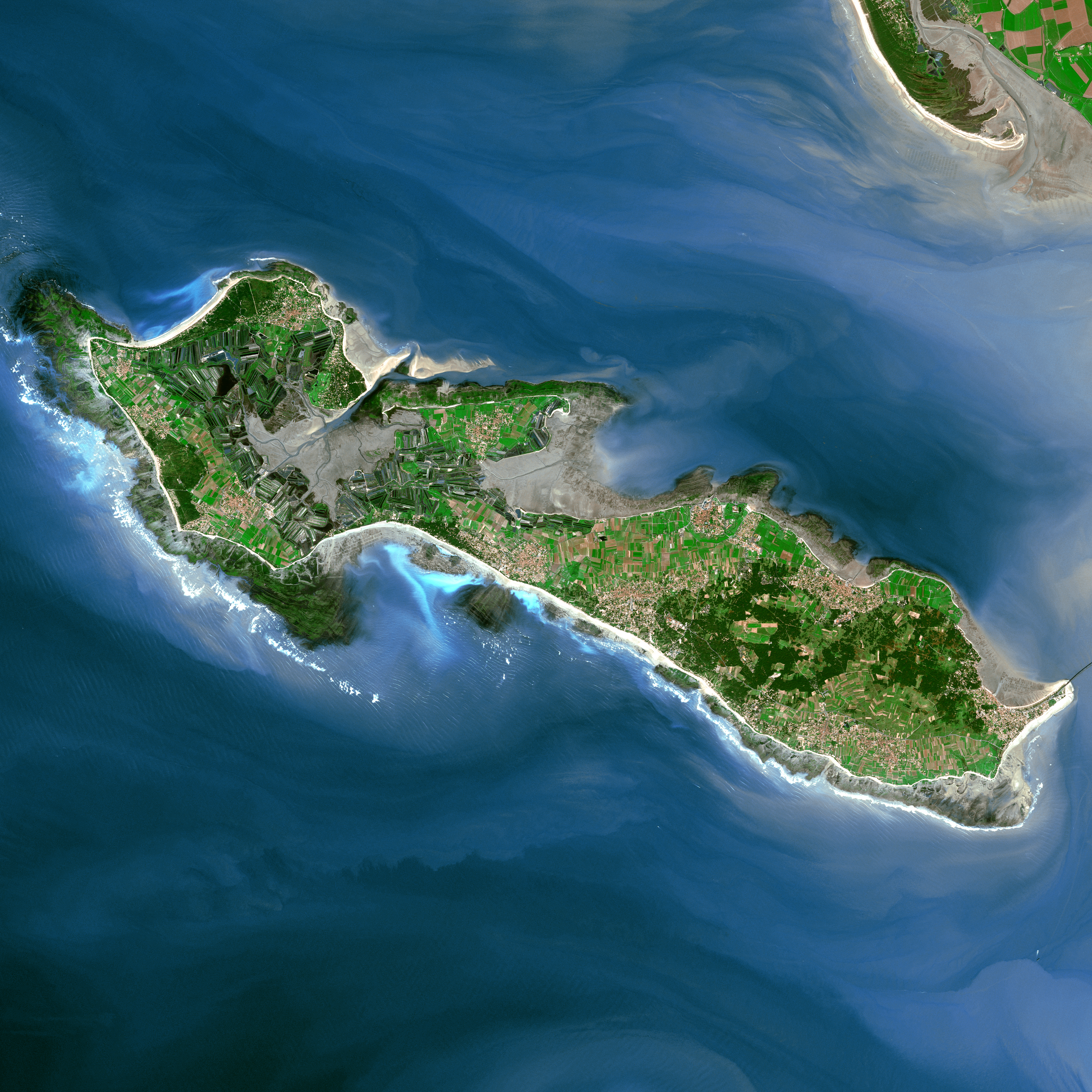
The island photographed by the Spot-5 satellite

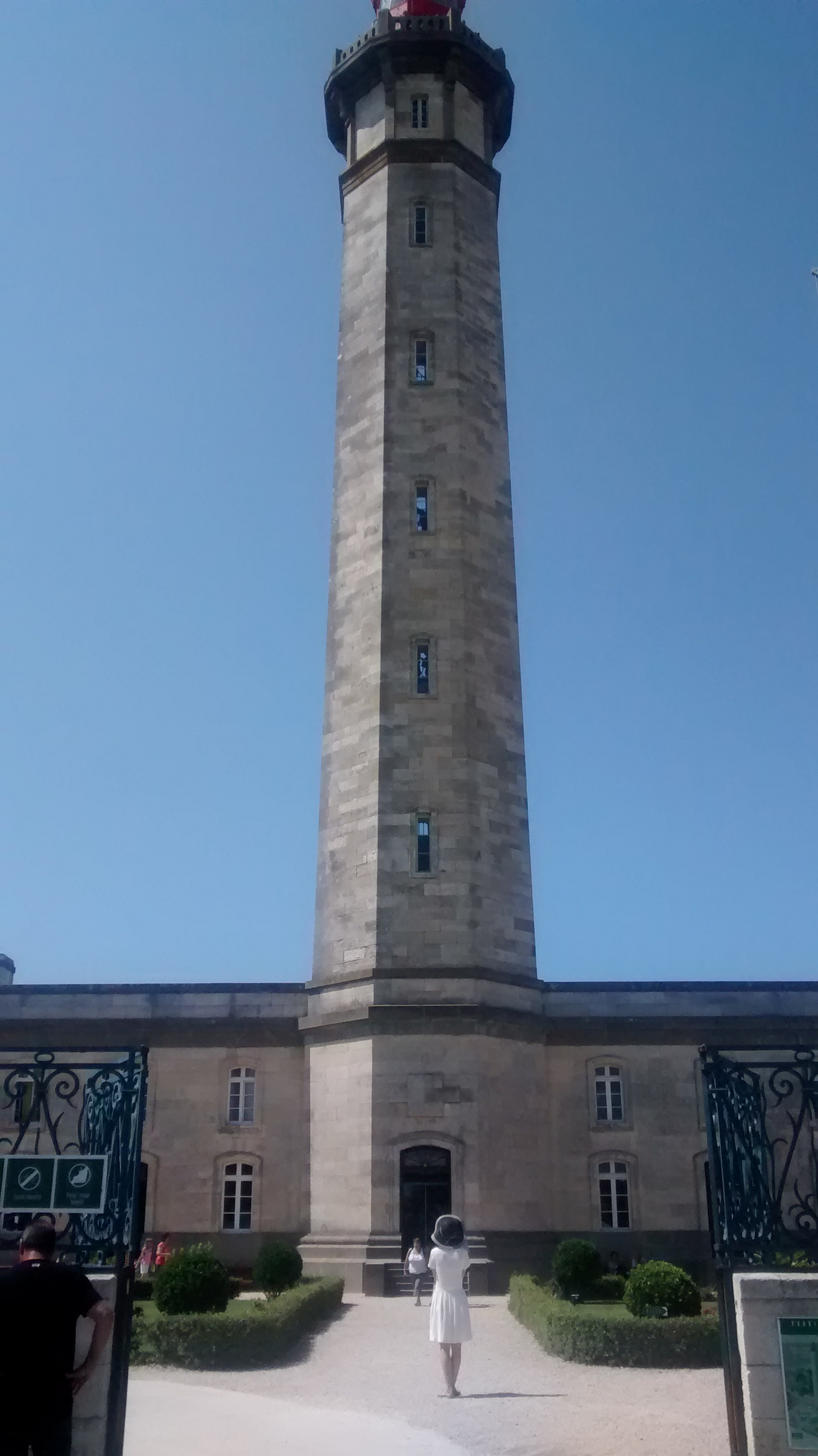
Le Phare des Baleines

== Sources ==
- Collins, Roger. "The Vaccaei, the Vaceti, and the rise of Vasconia". Studia Historica VI. Salamanca, 1988. Reprinted in Roger Collins, Law, Culture and Regionalism in Early Medieval Spain. Variorum, 1992. ISBN 0-86078-308-1.
