= Tidcombe =

Village in Wiltshire, England

Coordinates: 51.323°N 01.585°W

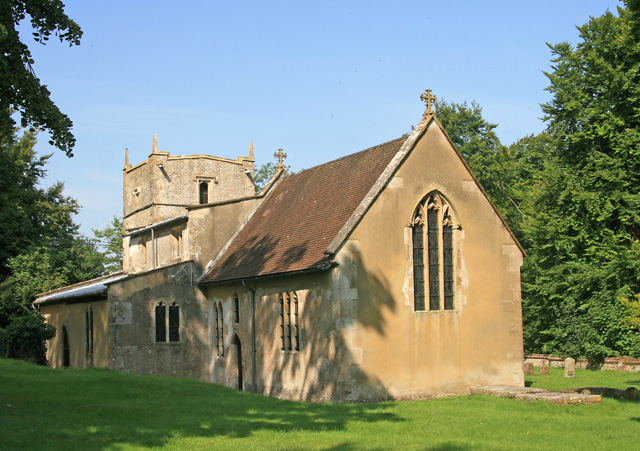
- St Michael's, Tidcombe

- Location within Wiltshire
- OS grid reference: SU290583
- Civil parish: Tidcombe and Fosbury
- Unitary authority: Wiltshire
- Ceremonial county: Wiltshire
- Region: South West
- Country: England
- Sovereign state: United Kingdom
- Post town: Marlborough
- Postcode district: SN8
- Dialling code: 01264
- Police: Wiltshire
- Fire: Dorset and Wiltshire
- Ambulance: South Western
- UK Parliament: East Wiltshire

Tidcombe is a small village in Wiltshire, England, on the eastern edge of the county, near Hampshire, about 9 miles (14 km) southeast of Marlborough and 7 miles (11 km) southwest of Hungerford. With few inhabitants, it forms part of the civil parish of Tidcombe and Fosbury, which has a parish meeting.

== History ==
There is a prehistoric ditch on the slopes of Tidcombe Down, south and southwest of the village; part of the western boundary of the parish follows it. Also on the down is a Neolithic long barrow, 54m long. The eastern boundary of the ancient parish followed the Roman road from Cirencester to Winchester, known in this area as Chute Causeway; on this section, between Marlborough in the northwest and Andover in the southeast, the road deviates south to avoid the dry valleys around Hippenscombe.

Domesday Book of 1086 recorded nine households at Titicome. Tidcombe lay within Savernake Forest until 1330.

Lords of the manor included William Esturmy of Wulfhall (died 1427; MP and Speaker of the House of Commons) and John Seymour (died 1464, also an MP). By 1540 the manor had been acquired by Edward Seymour (brother of queen consort Jane Seymour; later Duke of Somerset and Lord Protector; executed 1552) and it passed to his son Edward Seymour, 1st Earl of Hertford (1539–1621). The manor remained with the Dukes of Somerset until 1675, and was then held by the Seymours alongside Pewsey until sold around 1767 by Hugh Percy, 1st Duke of Northumberland and his wife Elizabeth (née Seymour) to Edward Tanner (d.1779).

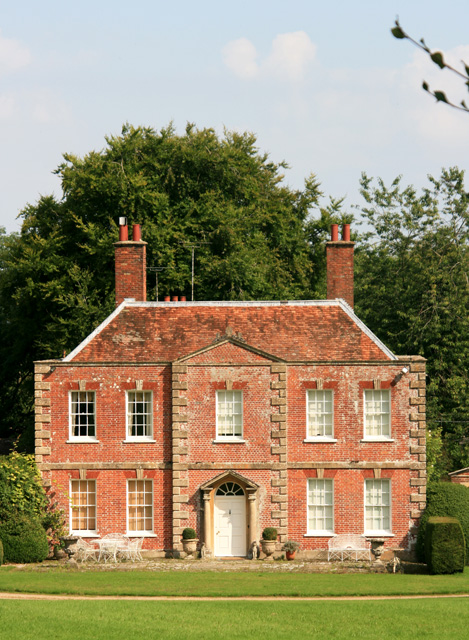
Tidcombe manor house

Tanner's son John (d.1797) was probably the builder of the manor house, near the church. In brick and stone dressings and with a five-bay front, it is now Grade II* listed.

In the 19th century, the names Tidcombe and Titcombe were both in use.

== Parish church ==
There is evidence of a church in the mid 13th century. The present church, in part-rendered flint with stone dressings, is from the 14th century. The nave was re-roofed in the 15th century, and in the 17th the low two-stage west tower was added which necessitated shortening the nave. The north porch, in brick and described by Pevsner as humble carries a date of 1675. The chancel was restored and paved in the 19th century.

Two of the three bells are from the 17th century. The churchyard has a chest tomb of 1770, a memorial to Marie and Jane Tanner; and 19th-century tombs of the Hawkins family of neighbouring Wexcombe. The church was recorded as Grade II* listed in 1966.

The Fosbury tithing was made a separate ecclesiastical parish in 1856 after a church was built there. Hippenscombe, until then extra-parochial, was added to Tidcombe parish in 1879. Fosbury benefice was united with Tidcombe in 1926, although the parishes remained distinct; the incumbent was to live at the Fosbury parsonage. In 1962 the benefice was united with East Grafton. The parish was united with Tidcombe in 1979 and Fosbury church was declared redundant. Today the parish forms part of the Savernake team ministry, alongside eleven other rural churches around Burbage.

There is an early parish register, for 1635 to 1700.

== Notable residents ==
George Jellicoe, 2nd Earl Jellicoe, wartime commander of the Special Boat Service and long-serving politician in the House of Lords, lived at Tidcombe Manor in later life until his death in 2007.
