= Rivedoux-Plage =

- Commune
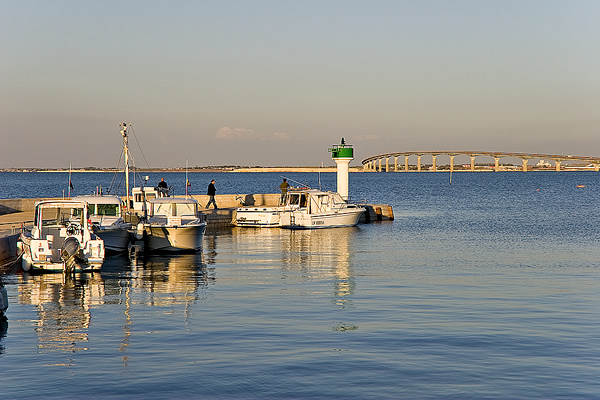
- Port of Rivedoux-Plage with the Île de Ré bridge in the background

- Coat of arms
- Location of Rivedoux-Plage
- Location within France Location within Nouvelle-Aquitaine
- Coordinates: 46°09′37″N 1°16′28″W
- Country: France
- Region: Nouvelle-Aquitaine
- Department: Charente-Maritime
- Arrondissement: La Rochelle
- Canton: Île de Ré
- Intercommunality: Île de Ré

Government
  - Mayor (2020–2026): Patrice Raffarin
- Area^{1}: 4.52 km^{2} (1.75 sq mi)
- Highest elevation: 16 m (52 ft)
- Lowest elevation: 0 m (0 ft)
- Population (2023): 2,483
  - Density: 549/km^{2} (1,420/sq mi)
- Time zone: UTC+01:00 (CET)
  - Summer (DST): UTC+02:00 (CEST)
- INSEE/Postal code: 17297 /17940
- ^{1} French Land Register data, which excludes lakes, ponds, glaciers > 1 km^{2} (0.386 sq mi or 247 acres) and river estuaries.

Rivedoux-Plage (French pronunciation: [ʁivdu plaʒ]) is a commune in the Charente-Maritime department in southwestern France. It is situated on the Île de Ré.

The commune includes the beach of Sablanceau. People who live on the island are called the Rivedousais and the Rivedousaises.

== Population ==
Historical population
Year	Pop.	±% p.a.
1968	635	—
1975	737	+2.15%
1982	900	+2.90%
1990	1,163	+3.26%
1999	1,754	+4.67%
2007	2,260	+3.22%
2012	2,282	+0.19%
2017	2,280	−0.02%
2023	2,483	+1.43%
Source: INSEE

== Geography ==
The Rivedoux-Plage includes a small town and a small port, and is located on the eastern end of the Ile de Ré on the coast, across from La Rochelle and bordered by the Pertuis Breton and the Pertuis d'Antioche.

- The southeast includes a large sandy beach which faces La Rochelle and the island of Aix.

== Economy ==
Main activities:

- agriculture: potatoes, asparagus, vines;
- oyster farming, boating, fishing;
- tourism (accommodation: two hotels, two campsites, guesthouses, seasonal rentals).

== History ==
- Rivedoux was built as a seigneury on 15 January 1480, under the request of Messire Jean Arnaud, squire, and under the permission of the commendatory abbot of the Notre-Dame-de-Sainte-Marie-des-Châtellers abbey, Louis de La Trémoille.
- On 12 September 1562 Jean-Pierre Arnaud-Bruneau obtained the right to have a port in his lordship, and he created the port the following year.
- In 1953 Jean Arnaud-Bruneau, the son of the previous Bruneau, built some of the first houses in Riverdoux around his manor
- In 1595, he added the entire Pointe de Sablanceaux to his estate.

== Local Culture and Heritage ==
=== Places and monuments ===
- The Ile de Ré bridge connects the island to the mainland at Sablanceaux in Rivedoux-Plage, at a place called La Repentie in La Pallice
- The Chauveau lighthouse, located at the southern tip of the Ile de Ré, which is accessible on foot at low tide
- The redoubt of Rivedoux, a fortification built in 1674 by Vauban
- The Sablanceaux battery
- The House of the Count of Hastrel and its tower
- The tidal mill, built by Mr. Boulineau in 1845
- Surf and windsurf spots on the south coast
- Kitesurf spots on the northern coast
- The north beach. A large beach forming the bay of Rivedoux, stretching from the Ile de Ré bridge to the port
- The southern beach, stretching from the Ile de Ré bridge to the Pointe de Chauveau. The southern beach includes wheelchair access, and access for people with reduced mobility and impaired vision

== See also ==
- Communes of the Charente-Maritime department
