= Conholt =

Village in Wiltshire, England

Coordinates: 51.293°N 1.536°W

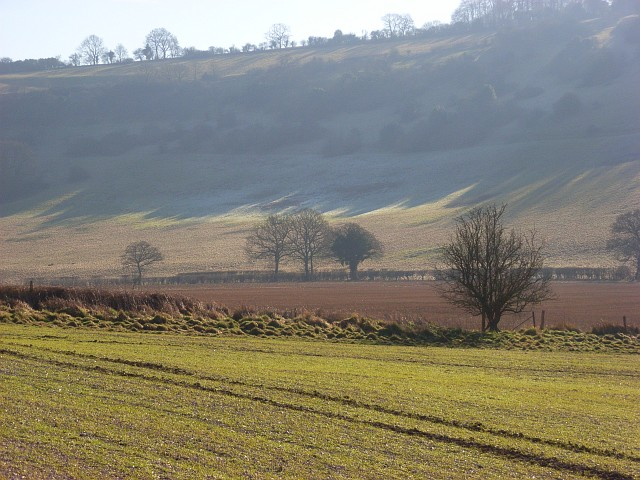
- Conholt Bottom

- Location within Wiltshire
- OS grid reference: SU325550
- Unitary authority: Wiltshire
- Ceremonial county: Wiltshire
- Region: South West
- Country: England
- Sovereign state: United Kingdom
- Post town: ANDOVER
- Postcode district: SP11 9
- Police: Wiltshire
- Fire: Dorset and Wiltshire
- Ambulance: South Western

Conholt was a small village in east Wiltshire, England, close to the Hampshire border and about 6 miles (10 km) northwest of Andover. It is now the site of the Conholt Park estate.

There may have been a village here in the 13th century, but by the 16th there were only farmsteads. In the late 17th century a deer park was created. Since the 19th century the land has been part of Chute civil parish.

The country house known as Conholt Park was built in the late 17th century and extended in the 18th and early 19th. The house is Grade II* listed and its 18th-century stable block and carriage house are Grade II listed. In 1992 the estate was acquired by a company belonging to the family of Paul van Vlissingen, an Anglo-Dutch businessman and philanthropist; it was his home from 1994 until his death in 2006. American billionaire Steve Schwarzman purchased the house, with 2,500 acres, in 2022 for an amount reported to be in excess of £80 million.
