= Fosbury =

Village in Wiltshire, England

Coordinates: 51.321°N 1.542°W

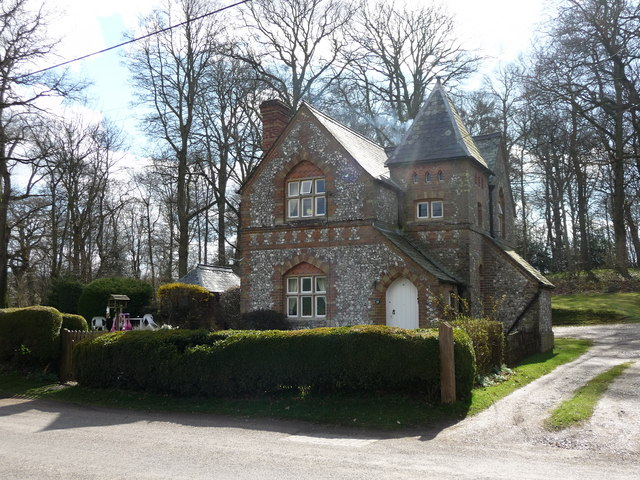
- House at Fosbury

- Location within Wiltshire
- OS grid reference: SU320581
- Civil parish: Tidcombe and Fosbury
- Unitary authority: Wiltshire
- Ceremonial county: Wiltshire
- Region: South West
- Country: England
- Sovereign state: United Kingdom
- Post town: Marlborough
- Postcode district: SN8
- Dialling code: 01264
- Police: Wiltshire
- Fire: Dorset and Wiltshire
- Ambulance: South Western
- UK Parliament: East Wiltshire

Fosbury is a small village in Wiltshire, England, on the eastern edge of the county, near Hampshire. It lies about 11 miles (18 km) southeast of Marlborough and 7 miles (11 km) south of Hungerford, Berkshire. With few inhabitants, it forms part of the civil parish of Tidcombe and Fosbury, which has a parish meeting.

== History ==
The Iron Age hill fort of Fosbury Camp lies on high ground south of the village. Two estates at Fostesberie were recorded in Domesday Book of 1086, with altogether 14 households. The smaller one was granted for a time to Shaftesbury Abbey and then to the priory at Noyon-sur-Andelle, France (now Charleval, Eure). In 1414 it was granted to the new priory at Sheen, Surrey.

Fosbury lay within Savernake Forest until 1330. A small medieval village has disappeared; most of the present buildings are from the 19th century.

Fosbury House, northwest of Fosbury, was built around 1800. From 1810 it was the seat of the Bevan banking family, and later was the home of bibliophile Alfred Henry Huth until his death in 1910.

== Church ==
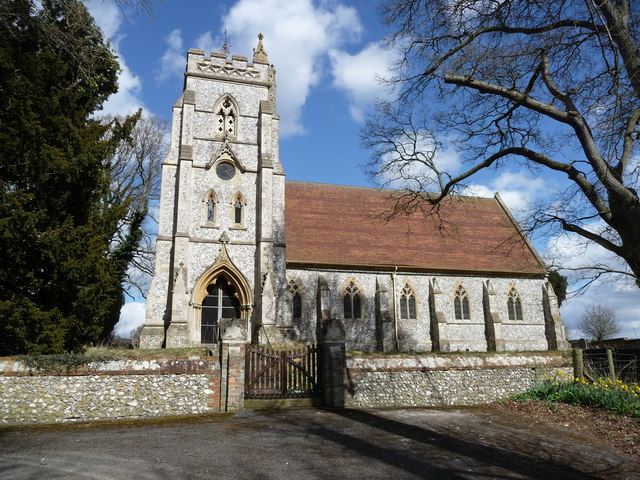
Christ Church

The Anglican Christ Church is Grade II* listed. It was built in 1854–56 by S.S. Teulon, declared redundant in 1979, and is now in private ownership. In flint with stone dressings, it has a three-stage tower with an octagonal stair turret. Pevsner writes that, apart from details of the chancel roof, there is "little otherwise of Teulon's obstinate originality".

Teulon also designed the house for the perpetual curate, close to the church and known as Buchan House. In flint with brick decoration, and with stonework matching the church, it too was completed in 1856.

Fosbury was anciently a tithing of Tidcombe parish. In 1856, after the consecration of Christ Church, an ecclesiastical district was created for it. The benefice was united with Tidcombe in 1926, although the parishes remained distinct; the incumbent was to live at the Fosbury parsonage. In 1962 the benefice was united with East Grafton. The parish was united with Tidcombe in 1979 and the church was declared redundant; soon after it was sold to the owner of Buchan House.
