= Fosbury Camp =

Iron Age hillfort in Wiltshire, England

- Haydon Hill Castle
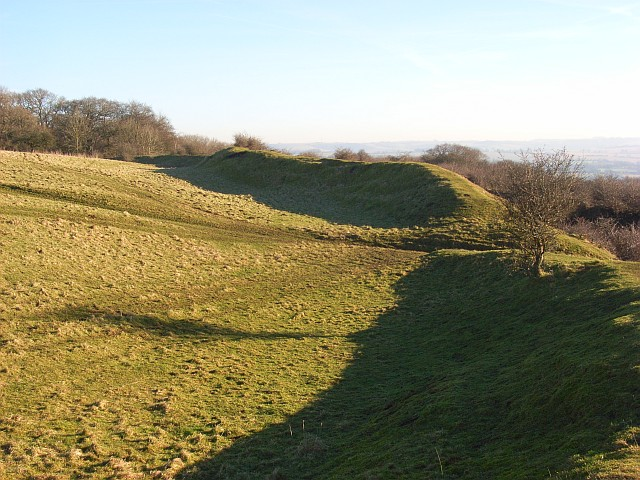
- Fosbury Camp, looking along the inner wall of the Iron Age hillfort towards Oakhill Wood

- Location within Wiltshire
- 51.3067°N 1.5438°W
- Periods: Iron Age
- Location: Wiltshire

Site notes
- Area: 26 acres (11 ha)
- Public access: yes

Fosbury Camp, is the site of an Iron Age bivallate hillfort located in Wiltshire. The site is oval in shape, and approximately 26 acres in area.

The site is a scheduled national monument number WI162. The fort sits atop Knolls Down and is excellently defended to the south, south west, and east, from the very steeply sloped topology. To the north the land is less steep, and is mostly bounded by Oakhill Wood. To the west the ground rises to the true summit of Haydown Hill. In the eastern side of the camp there lies a pond, perhaps an original feature of the Neolithic site.

== Location ==
The site is located at grid reference SU319565, south of the village and civil parish of Fosbury in Wiltshire, and is near the towns of Marlborough and Hungerford. It lies at a height of 254m AOD, slightly below the summit of the hill at 258m AOD. The site is easily accessed by public footpaths running to the north of the site, and the borders of Oakhill Wood.

== See also ==
- List of places in Wiltshire
- List of hill forts in England
- List of hill forts in Scotland
- List of hill forts in Wales
